= Four-handed =

Four-handed may refer to:

- Four-handed All Fours, four player card game
- Four-player chess, chess variant
- Piano four hands, when two players play on a single piano.
