= List of chess historians =

This is a list of chess historians.

== Chess historians ==
- Yuri Averbakh
- Henry Bird
- Ricardo Calvo (October 22, 1943 – September 26, 2002)
- Hiram Cox
- G. H. Diggle
- David Vincent Hooper
- Willard Fiske
- Professor Duncan Forbes
- Jeremy Gaige
- Ann Gunter
- Tim Harding (chess player)
- H. F. W. Holt
- Thomas Hyde (29 June 1636 – 18 February 1703)
- Sir William Jones (September 28, 1746 – April 27, 1794)
- Garry Kasparov
- Baron von der Lasa
- David H. Li
- Antonius van der Linde
- A. A. Macdonell
- H. J. R. Murray (June 24, 1868 – May 16, 1955)
- Joseph Needham
- A. v. Oefele
- M. E. V. Savenkof
- F. Strohmeyer
- Olimpiu G. Urcan
- Bo Utas
- John Griswold White
- Ken Whyld (6 March 1926 – 11 July 2003)
- William Henry Wilkinson
- Edward Winter
- Emilia Castelao, her studies focus on chess as a tool in diplomacy
