= Cox–Forbes theory =

Theory on the evolution of chess

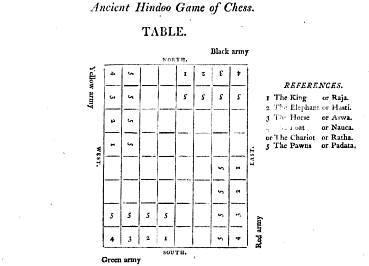
Cox's illustration of the "ancient Hindoo game of chess" (1801)

The Cox–Forbes theory is a long-debunked theory on the evolution of chess put forward by Captain Hiram Cox (1760–1799) and extended by Professor Duncan Forbes (1798–1868).

The theory states that a four-handed dice-chess game (Chaturaji) originated in India in approximately 3000 BC; and that arising from the results of certain rules, or the difficulty in getting enough players, the game evolved into a two-handed game (Chaturanga). On account of religious and legal objections in Hinduism to gambling, the dice were dropped from the game, making it a game of pure skill.

== Theory ==
The theory arose from an article by Hiram Cox published posthumously in Asiatic Researches in 1801. Cox's article was a commentary on an earlier article written by Sir William Jones, which included an account of the Indian text Bhavishya Purana, which he believed to date from c.3000 BC. Jones stated that this contained a description of a four-player version of chess, presented in the form of a dialogue between Yudhishthira and Vyasa. Jones argued that the four-player version described was a variation of the original two-player form of the game. Cox's article, "On the Burmha Game of Chess Compared to the Indian", proposed that the four-handed version of the game was the earliest form of chess. He states that this version "is mentioned in the oldest law books and is said to have been invented by the wife of Ravan", referring to Ravana, the legendary king of Sri Lanka. Cox dates Ravan to "three thousand eight hundred years ago".

Forbes developed this idea in his 1860 book The History of Chess, accepting the 3000 BC dating of the Purana. In Forbes's explanation, the four-handed dice version is called Chaturanga, and Forbes insists that Chaturaji is a misnomer that actually refers to a victory condition in the game akin to checkmate. In his 1860 account, the players in opposite corners are allies against the other team of two. He represents this "Chaturanga" as gradually developing into the two-player diceless form by the time it was adopted by the Persians as "Chatrang". He further asserts that this name later became "Shatranj" after the Arabic pronunciation.

== Refutation ==
The earliest Puranas are now assigned a more conservative date of 500 BC, rather than 3000 BC. Furthermore, Albrecht Weber (1825–1901) and Dutch chess historian Antonius van der Linde (1833–97) found that the Purana quoted by Forbes did not even contain the references he claimed. While working on Geschichte und Litteratur des Schachspiels (Berlin, 1874, in two volumes), Van der Linde also found that the actual text around which Forbes had built his entire theory was the Tithitattva of Raghunandana, which was written around AD 1500, rather than 3000 BC as claimed by Forbes. Van der Linde thought that Forbes deliberately lied, and was furious. John G. White, writing in 1898, did not suggest deliberate deception on Forbes's part, but insisted that "He did not even make good use of the material known to him." As a result, the theory is now rejected by all serious chess historians.

== See also ==
- History of chess
- Four-player chess
