= Ricardo Calvo =

Personal information
- Born: Ricardo Calvo Mínguez; October 22, 1943 Spain
- Died: September 26, 2002 (aged 58)

Chess career
- Country: Spain
- Title: International Master (1973)
- Peak rating: 2470 (July 1973)

Ricardo Calvo Mínguez (October 22, 1943 – September 26, 2002) was a Spanish chess player, doctor, author, reporter, and chess historian, who was awarded the title of International Master in 1973 and played for Spain at the Chess Olympiads of 1966, 1968, 1972 and 1974. He died in 2002 from esophageal cancer.

== Early life ==
Calvo spoke fluent Spanish, German, and English. As a chess historian, Dr. Calvo set out to prove that Spain was central to the monumental changes that occurred in chess late in the fifteenth century. It is most widely believed that the increased powers of the queen and the bishop were introduced during the Renaissance in Italy; however, Calvo insisted that Spain played a major role.

== Politics ==
Dr. Calvo was deeply involved in chess politics. In 1987, he was condemned by FIDE and declared "persona non grata" (Latin: "An unwelcome person") by a vote of 72-1, for writing a controversial article in New in Chess. The article, according to FIDE, was a "racial attack on Latin Americans". In response, Calvo wrote a letter to FIDE titled "On the Nature of FIDE Legitimacy" in which he disputed their decision:

...a ban against a chess player based on any political ideas is in itself an intellectual and juridical monstrosity...Yes, any Hitler, Stalin, Pol-Pot, Mao, Sadam or Ilyumzhinov has the right, if he wishes, to play in a chess tournament. This is the real greatness of our game, a spiritual refuge far above the dirty politics of everyday life in any country."

== Notable games ==
=== Ricardo Calvo vs Viktor Korchnoi ===
This game between Ricardo Calvo and GM Viktor Korchnoi is known as "Calvo's Salvo", and was played at the Havana Olympiad 1966: 1. e4 c5 2. Nf3 e6 3. d4 cxd4 4. Nxd4 a6 5. Bd3 Bc5 6. Nb3 Ba7 7. c4 Nc6 8. O-O Qh4?!, a dubious move by Korchnoi that will allow his queen to be targeted: 9. N1d2 Nge7 10. c5 Ne5 11. Be2 b6 12. f4 N5c6 13. Nc4 bxc5 14. g3 Qh6 15. f5 Qf6 16. fxe6 Qxe6 17. Nd6+ Kf8 18. Bc4!, now Korchnoi will lose his queen or be checkmated, so resigns: 1-0.

=== Ulf Andersson vs Ricardo Calvo ===
This game, played in 1997, was between Ulf Andersson and Ricardo Calvo: 1.Nf3 d5 2.c4 d4 3.g3 Nc6 4.d3 e5 5.Bg2 Bb4+ 6.Nbd2 a5 7.O-O Nge7 8.a3 Bd6 9.Ne4 Ng6 10.e3 Be7 11.exd4 exd4 12.Nfg5 h6 13.Nh3 O-O 14.f4 f5 15.Neg5 hxg5 16.Bd5+ Rf7 17.Qh5 Qd6 18.Re1 Bd7 19.fxg5 Nce5 20.Nf4 Ra6 21.Bd2 Bf8 22.Rac1 c5 23.h4 Nh8 24.Qe2 Ng4 25.h5 g6 0-1.

== See also ==
- List of chess historians
- New in Chess
