= Four-player chess =

Family of chess variants specially designed for four players

	a	b	c	d	e	f	g	h	i	j	k	l	m	n
14	a14 w w	b14 w w	c14 w w	d14 r y	e14 n y	f14 b y	g14 k y	h14 q y	i14 b y	j14 n y	k14 r y	l14 w w	m14 w w	n14 w w	14
13	a13 w w	b13 w w	c13 w w	d13 p y	e13 p y	f13 p y	g13 p y	h13 p y	i13 p y	j13 p y	k13 p y	l13 w w	m13 w w	n13 w w	13
12	a12 w w	b12 w w	c12 w w	d12	e12	f12	g12	h12	i12	j12	k12	l12 w w	m12 w w	n12 w w	12
11	a11 black rook	b11 black pawn	c11	d11	e11	f11	g11	h11	i11	j11	k11	l11	m11 p g	n11 r g	11
10	a10 black knight	b10 black pawn	c10	d10	e10	f10	g10	h10	i10	j10	k10	l10	m10 p g	n10 n g	10
9	a9 black bishop	b9 black pawn	c9	d9	e9	f9	g9	h9	i9	j9	k9	l9	m9 p g	n9 b g	9
8	a8 black king	b8 black pawn	c8	d8	e8	f8	g8	h8	i8	j8	k8	l8	m8 p g	n8 q g	8
7	a7 black queen	b7 black pawn	c7	d7	e7	f7	g7	h7	i7	j7	k7	l7	m7 p g	n7 k g	7
6	a6 black bishop	b6 black pawn	c6	d6	e6	f6	g6	h6	i6	j6	k6	l6	m6 p g	n6 b g	6
5	a5 black knight	b5 black pawn	c5	d5	e5	f5	g5	h5	i5	j5	k5	l5	m5 p g	n5 n g	5
4	a4 black rook	b4 black pawn	c4	d4	e4	f4	g4	h4	i4	j4	k4	l4	m4 p g	n4 r g	4
3	a3 w w	b3 w w	c3 w w	d3	e3	f3	g3	h3	i3	j3	k3	l3 w w	m3 w w	n3 w w	3
2	a2 w w	b2 w w	c2 w w	d2 p r	e2 p r	f2 p r	g2 p r	h2 p r	i2 p r	j2 p r	k2 p r	l2 w w	m2 w w	n2 w w	2
1	a1 w w	b1 w w	c1 w w	d1 r r	e1 n r	f1 b r	g1 q r	h1 k r	i1 b r	j1 n r	k1 r r	l1 w w	m1 w w	n1 w w	1
	a	b	c	d	e	f	g	h	i	j	k	l	m	n
A popular four-player chessboard and initial setup
- Genres: Abstract strategy game; Chess variant
- Players: 4
- Chance: None
- Skills: Strategy, tactics, psychology
- Synonyms: Four-handed chess

Four-player chess (also known as four-handed chess) is a family of chess variants played with four people. The game features a special board typically made of a standard 8×8 square, with 3 rows of 8 cells each extending from each side, and requires two sets of differently colored pieces. The rules are similar to, but not the same as, regular chess. There are a variety of different rule variations; most variations, however, share a somewhat similar board and piece setup.

Variations of four-handed chess have been around for centuries. The modern game has been around for over 200 years, popping up in different places in Europe. Historically, the Four-Handed Chess Club, which was founded by George Hope Lloyd-Verney in 1884 in London, is the most well regarded iteration. Currently, it can be played online, or bought commercially to be played in person.

Gameplay can be in teams, typically with the two partners across from each other. It can also be free-for-all, with each of the players trying to gain a decisive advantage, with no set alliances. Free-for-all can be played for points, to be the last one standing or till the first checkmate. Table-talk, such as move suggestions, is not allowed under the FFA (Free for all) rules; players must decide for themselves who, when, or how to attack.

== Definition ==
According to D. B. Pritchard, four-player chess "is generally understood to be a partnership game played with two sets on a standard board with four extensions, one on each side, usually of 8×3 squares (arguably the best arrangement) but sometimes 8×2 or 8×4, on which the pieces are set up in the normal array positions."

== History ==
The Taḥqīq mā li-l-hind min maqūlah maqbūlah fī al-ʿaql aw mardhūlah (c. 1030) of al-Biruni, an encyclopedia of Indian culture, contains a description of chaturaji, a four-player chess-like game played with dice, which al-Biruni claims was unknown among the Arabs of his time. Either a four-sided rectangular die or a six-sided cubic die was rolled to determine which type of piece (king, elephant, horse, boat, pawn) was to be moved on a given turn. This game had unusual longevity by chess variant standards, as it was still played in its original form in the 15th century, and a version of the game without dice was still played in India in 1900, according to a contemporary article in the British Chess Magazine. While chaturaji never spread outside of India, possibly due to Islamic laws against gambling, a (likely coincidentally) similar game known as Four Seasons Chess was played in 13th-century Spain which was notable enough to be included in Libro de los Juegos.

The earliest known mention of four-player chess in its modern form is a pamphlet from Dessau, Germany, in 1784. William Coxe also wrote that same year that a four-player chess game, possibly fortress chess, was played in Russia at the time. It is possible that one of these games inspired the other, and likely that one or both of them were inspired by Filippo Marinelli's three-player chess game invented in Italy in 1722. Four-handed Chess, as it was called, grew in popularity throughout the 19th century, with variations of the game appearing in Germany, Britain and the United States, among others. Many different pamphlets sprang up with minor rule changes, such as where the king and queen were, or how to deal with pawns that ran into each other. Cox–Forbes theory, a popular theory among chess historians at the time that was developed during the century by Hiram Cox and Duncan Forbes, proposed that chaturaji was approximately 5000 years old and was the predecessor to modern chess. However, this theory was refuted in the latter half of the century by Antonius van der Linde and Albrecht Weber, and is now rejected by all serious chess historians.

George Hope Lloyd-Verney, a pivotal figure in the game's history, was first introduced to it by Horatia Nelson. On September 20, 1881, a leading article in The Times referred to the game as "failed", which prompted Verney, who was a seasoned player by then, to send a letter in response that same day. In the letter he made a point that he would continue to make during his frequent advocacy of the game, that being that four-player chess is quite distinct from standard chess due to the latter being more scientific in nature and the former being more casual due to its heightened complexity, and that both games were enjoyed for completely different reasons despite their common heritage. This letter was inserted in the September 22nd 1881 issue of the Times, and as a result Verney received many personal queries about the game. In response, Verney published a book that year called Four-handed Chess detailing the rules of the game, which perpetuated its popularity in the Anglosphere. It was followed up in 1885 by Chess Eccentricities, an encyclopedia of chess variants with more than two players that also contained various correspondences between Verney and both fans and critics of the game. Verney also founded a Four-handed Chess Club in London in 1884. It was somewhat well known in London, and it had eighty people attend its inaugural meeting. The club started off by following Verney's ruleset, but this changed a few years later in 1888 when Montague Edward Hughes-Hughes, in an attempt to improve the game's popularity, invented a new ruleset that was slightly more similar to standard chess, which quickly became the preferred ruleset of the club. The club played until World War II.

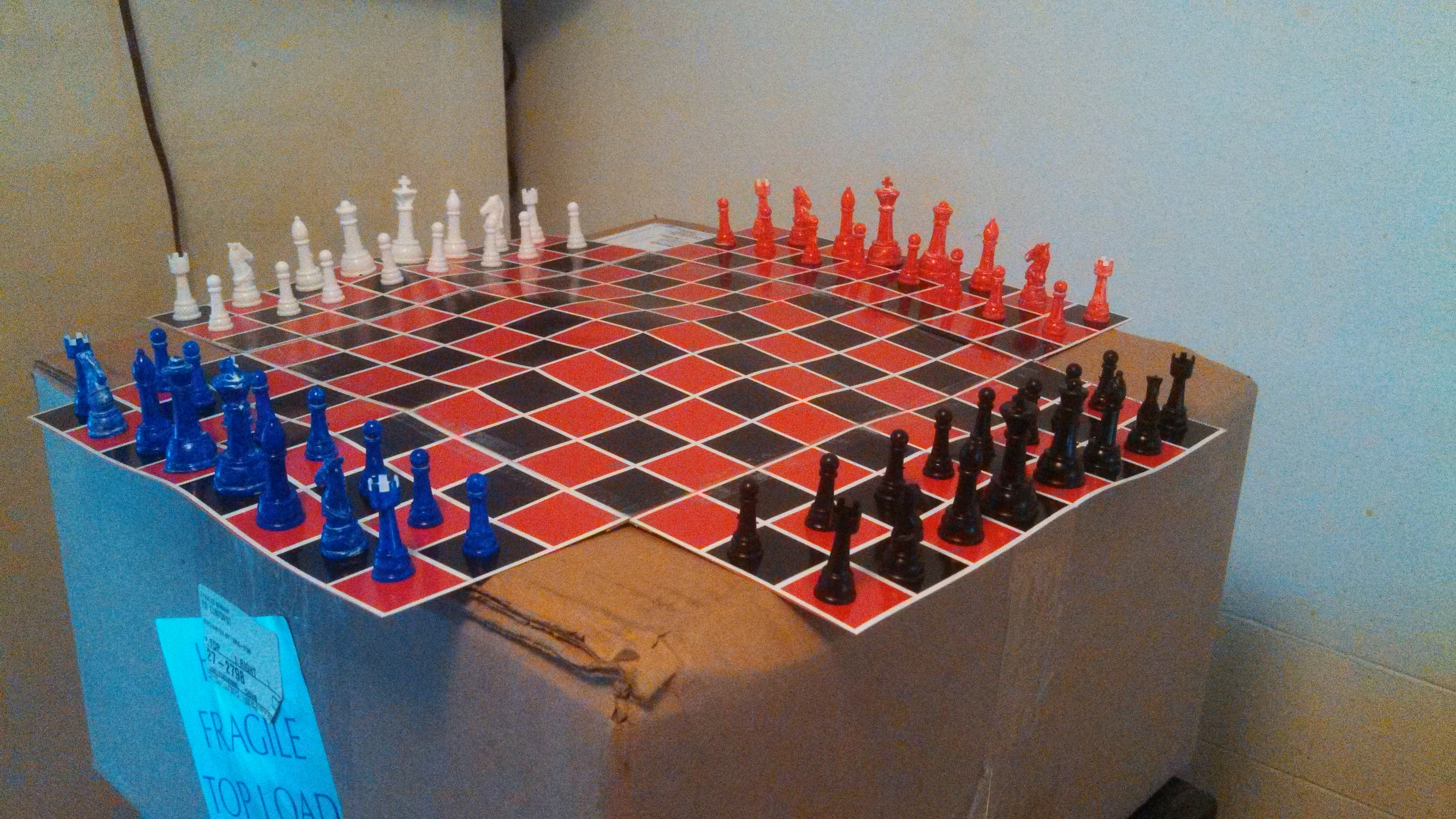
A four-player chess board set up

There are a few historical figures who played, or are alleged to have played, the game. Verney claimed that the Czar, probably Alexander III, played the game. Prince Albert is said to have played it. However, the figure most commonly associated with the game is Vladimir Lenin. Lenin is said to have played the game passionately with his family, including Anna Ulyanova, in his youth. After becoming an active revolutionary, Lenin came up with the idea of using a four-player chess table, which was constructed in 1894–1895, to hide illegal documents in through a hollowed out table leg. The table survived Lenin's arrest in 1895, and ended up in the hands of Ulyanova the year after. In 1900, the table was replaced after Mark Yelizarov came up with a new idea for storing documents, that being a secret drawer within the table. This new table survived many police searches without suspicion, keeping documents safe for Lenin, his family and his allies right up until the February Revolution. The table is now on display in the State Historical Museum.

The game fell out of popularity at around the beginning of the 20th century. However, beginning in the 1960s, a resurgence of the game took place as various four-player chess board games were created. While they maintained the layout of the variants of previous centuries, most of these games were marketed as FFA games, ditching the historically preferred teams format. The game remained relatively obscure throughout the century, appealing almost exclusively to casual players. In 2016, a university student named John Flickinger created a chess website named Hello Chess that was focused towards FFA four-player chess and general casual chess play. The website was successful enough to attract the attention of Erik Allebest, the co-founder and CEO of Chess.com, who wanted to port the game to his site. During the summer of 2017, Flickinger, who was brought on board by Allebest, worked alongside various other developers to bring the game to Chess.com. During development, Jay Severson, the other co-founder and CTO of Chess.com, came up with the idea of winning via a points system rather than via being the last player left. This idea was implemented and the game was officially released on October 28, 2016, being given its own section of the site. This embracing by Chess.com gave four-player chess unprecedented popularity. A teams variant, which did not use the points system, was added soon after.

Contemporarily, four-player chess is one of the most popular chess variants. It frequently tops Chess.com's concurrent player rankings on its variants section. GM Hikaru Nakamura has played the game numerous times in live streams, often alongside prominent figures like Levy Rozman, Alexandra Botez and GM Anish Giri. A FFA 4 Player Chess Championship has been hosted and funded by Chess.com annually since 2019. In 2023, the Championship split into two separate "Original Solo" and "Standard FFA" Championships, with each having a slightly different ruleset and starting position. The most recent (2023) winners are Delan Lara (Original Solo) and Carlos Tadeo (Standard FFA).

== Rules ==
Piece movement and captures remain the same as regular chess.

A board made of a standard 8×8 square with an additional 3 rows of 8 cells extending from each side is what is typically used for Four-player chess. Variants vary as to where the king and queen are placed; this doesn't matter for casual play. Otherwise, pieces are set up like regular chess.

Rules vary, in teams, as to how to deal with partners' pawns when they run into each other. This happens sometimes because everybody moves in the forward direction, as in regular chess. When this happens for the Chess.com variant, the pawns are blocked, while some variants historically allowed pawns to jump over each other if this happened.

Players are free to change all rules to their convenience (see the rules section in the links tab for different variations of the rules).

=== Chess.com rules ===
Play starts with red, and turns are clockwise.

==== Free For All (FFA) ====
The goal is to have the most points at the end of the game:

- Pawns (and promoted pawns) are worth one point
- A player's queen is worth nine points
- Bishops are worth five points
- Rooks are also worth five points
- Knights are worth three points
- Checkmates (and in rare cases king captures) are worth twenty points.

Pawns promote to queens on the eighth rank, which is at the middle of the board.

When a player is checkmated, all their pieces turn grey. When this happens, they cannot move and don't give a player any points. A player is checkmated immediately; in other words, they don't have to wait for their opponents to move to be checkmated.

The game ends when three players are defeated. It also ends when there are two players left and one player has more than twenty points more than the other player (because, if they were checkmated, they would still win) In this case, the leading player may have to click a button that says "claim win".

Trying to influence another player to help you by communicating in the chat (such as saying "team with me" or "take queen") is against the rules. However, it is perfectly legal to aid another player's attacks, or choosing not to attack a player because you would think it would benefit you.

==== Teams ====
In teams, the goal is to checkmate one of the opposing players. You work with your opposite, and can suggest moves with arrows. This time, queen promotion is on the eleventh rank. On chess.com you functionally have two armies, you and your opposite, with the exception that you are the only one that can move your army, and vice versa. Players are checkmated on their turn. This means that, theoretically, their opposite can block the checkmate, in some cases.

=== Modifications for in-person play ===
In FFA, if players don't wish to record points, they can alternatively play to the first person checkmated, or the last person standing. They can also, instead of playing for checkmate, make it so that a player instead has to capture the king, like any other piece.

In Teams, table-talk is historically not allowed in in-person play. Players can play until a player is checkmated, or they can make it so that both teammates need to be checkmated.

There are many different variations of these rules, including whether the board should be 8×2 or 8×3, or where the king and queen should be. Some historical variations allow the pawns to move in different directions, and some current rules remove checkmate, and instead require that the kings be captured.

==== Four-handed Chess Club rules ====
These are the major rules as adopted by the Four-handed Chess Club. This is somewhat quoted from the book 1893 book "Four Chess", which states the rules.

- All laws of ordinary chess which are not contradicted by the following rules, hold also in four-handed chess.
- A game is not won unless both opponents are checkmated or resign.
- If one player is checkmated and the other stalemated, the game is drawn. If one player is stalemated and the other is free to move, the former simply loses his move and the game continues.
- When one player is checkmated, the others continue to move in the same order as before, but he loses his move. His pieces merely occupy and block up the squares upon which they stand; they can neither be taken nor moved over so long as the mate continues. His opponents' kings can disregard the check of his pieces and even occupy an adjacent square to the mated king, as long as they do not allow the king to get out of check.
- When a player is checkmated his partner may stop the mate by taking one of the mating pieces, inducing it to move, interposing one of his pieces, or mating one of his opponents whose pieces are necessary to the checkmate. In the latter case, he must mate with his pieces alone, since his partner's pieces are inert.
- A checkmated player also regains the right to move if his opponents themselves raise the checkmate, and they can do so provided neither of their kings is in check of his pieces.
- When the mate is relieved, the mated player's pieces at once become liable to capture and able to give check, and he resumes play as soon as his turn comes around.
- No player can so move as to cause a check to be given to his or his partner's king; and if he cannot escape a check to his own king without causing a check to his partner's, he is mated.
- When a pawn is prevented from moving by one of the partner's pawns being on the square immediately in front of it, it can, as a move, hop over that pawn to the square behind it if that square is unoccupied.
- A pawn becomes a queen, or another piece at the player's option when it reaches the back row of squares (i.e. the row originally occupied by the opponent's pieces) of one of the opponents.
- When a pawn reaches the back row of their partner, their motion is reversed and is the same as that of their partner's pawns.

== Strategy ==
For teams, players attempt to coordinate their attacks with their opposite. If this is not possible, then players should attempt to play strong moves, developing their pieces to preemptively prevent typically double attacks from their opponents and put their pieces in strong positions to be able to coordinate attacks with their opposite. It is wise to play openings, such as (for the first player) moving the king's pawn up one, which shields against double-attacks, checks, and develop strong pieces.

In FFA, it is wise to be more cautious, developing pieces and improving king safety. Trades should only be done when they are beneficial, because, when there are four people, this weakens the traders compared to the other players. Bishops are about as strong as rooks, and both are stronger than knights. The queen is the strongest piece. One should try to develop their pieces and protect their king. In addition, players should try to avoid opening themselves up to attacks. For example, if the player to the left attacks them, then the player across from them or the player to their right can attack them as well, guaranteeing loss of material. Likewise, players should often look for ways to attack players that allow other players to join in.

== See also ==
- Chaturaji
- Fortress chess
- Three-player chess
