= Fortress chess =

Four-player chess variant

	a	b	c	d	e	f	g	h	i	j	k	l	m	n	o	p
16	a16	b16	c16	d16									m16	n16	o16	p16	16
15	a15	b15	c15	d15									m15	n15	o15	p15	15
14	a14	b14	c14	d14	e14	f14	g14	h14	i14	j14	k14	l14	m14	n14	o14	p14	14
13	a13	b13	c13	d13	e13	f13	g13	h13	i13	j13	k13	l13	m13	n13	o13	p13	13
12			c12	d12	e12	f12	g12	h12	i12	j12	k12	l12	m12	n12			12
11			c11	d11	e11	f11	g11	h11	i11	j11	k11	l11	m11	n11			11
10			c10	d10	e10	f10	g10	h10	i10	j10	k10	l10	m10	n10			10
9			c9	d9	e9	f9	g9	h9	i9	j9	k9	l9	m9	n9			9
8			c8	d8	e8	f8	g8	h8	i8	j8	k8	l8	m8	n8			8
7			c7	d7	e7	f7	g7	h7	i7	j7	k7	l7	m7	n7			7
6			c6	d6	e6	f6	g6	h6	i6	j6	k6	l6	m6	n6			6
5			c5	d5	e5	f5	g5	h5	i5	j5	k5	l5	m5	n5			5
4	a4	b4	c4	d4	e4	f4	g4	h4	i4	j4	k4	l4	m4	n4	o4	p4	4
3	a3	b3	c3	d3	e3	f3	g3	h3	i3	j3	k3	l3	m3	n3	o3	p3	3
2	a2	b2	c2	d2									m2	n2	o2	p2	2
1	a1	b1	c1	d1									m1	n1	o1	p1	1
	a	b	c	d	e	f	g	h	i	j	k	l	m	n	o	p

Fortress Chess

Fortress chess (also known as Russian Four-Handed chess) is a four-player chess variant played in Russia in the 18th and 19th centuries. The board contains 192 squares including the fortresses at its corners. The fortresses contain 16 squares and various pieces are placed inside.

== History ==
One of the earliest potential references to Fortress Chess comes from William Coxe in 1784, and Alexander Petrov's grandfather noted that Catherine the Great played the variant. The first confirmed modern version of Russian four-handed chess comes from what Ivan Alexandrovich Butrimov wrote about the game in 1821; however, he included few details about how the game was played. Alexander Petrov's publication of the rules and strategy in the German chess article Schachzeitung clarified most of the rules necessary to play the game.

== Rules ==
Fortress chess is a 4-player variant that is played in teams of 2 with teammates sitting opposite one another and moving clockwise. Within the 192 squares; there are 128 squares in the center and four 4×4 squares on each corner of the board. Each 4×4 square has a knight, bishop, and rook that each player may place however they see fit before the start of the game. All the pieces move exactly as they do in FIDE chess, with the exception of the gate on the sides of each 4×4 box, which no piece, including the knight, can go through. Pawns promote when they reach either to an opponent's side of a board, or they reach an allies board, though it is unclear whether the pawn is able to promote should it enter a player's fortress. Once an opponent is checkmated, all of their pieces are removed from the chessboard. The game ends when both players on a team are checkmated.

== Strategy ==
One of the key strategies for success in Fortress chess comes from running the king to the fortress for protection; as such castling queenside is often not preferred. Since all of the pieces of a teammate are removed after they are checkmated, it is significant for success to stop a teammate from being checkmated.

== See also ==
- Forchess
- Four-player chess
