= David H. Li =

Chinese writer and chess player

David H. Li (7 December 1928 – 12 July 2018) was a Chinese-American accountant, chess player, sinologist, translator, and writer.

== Biography and bibliography ==
He wrote several books and also translated several Chinese classics to English. He was born in 1928 in Ningbo, Zhejiang, China, and moved to the United States in 1949, and lived for many years in Bethesda, Maryland. He was an accountant and accounting teacher. His academic career included lectures at the University of Washington, Seattle, and as a Ford Foundation Visiting Professor at the Chinese University of Hong Kong. Later he joined the World Bank Group. After retirement, Li published a number of books in English on the culture of China, including translations of the Analects of Confucius, The Art of War, and Tao Te Ching, as well as several books on xiangqi or Chinese chess. He died after a brief illness, on July 12, 2018 in Silver Spring, Maryland, at the age of 89.

== Hypothesis ==
In his book The Genealogy of Chess (which won the 'Book of the Year' 1998 award from the editors of GAMES Magazine), Li surveys evidence regarding the origins of chess and concludes that an early version of chess called xiangqi was invented in China in 203 BC, by General Han Xin, who supposedly drew on the earlier game liubo as well as on the teachings of The Art of War. Li suggests that this game had spread via the Silk Road, to Persia (becoming various forms of shatranj) and India (becoming various forms of chaturanga), as well as to Japan (becoming shogi) and Korea (becoming janggi). Li's idea has been contested.

== See also ==
- Chess in China
- Xiangqi

== External links and references ==
- The Washington Post, January 28, 2000, by Chris Redgate - Review of book (translation): "The Analects of Confucius"
- Wisconsin Bookwatch, June 1, 2005 - Review of book: “Xiangqi Syllabus On Horse”
- ChessBase interview, 2005 — Part I and Part II
- A critical assessment of David H. Li's "The Genealogy of Chess" by Peter Banaschak
