= Ann Gunter =

Art historian

- Occupation: Art historian
- Title: Bertha and Max Dressler Professor in the Humanities

Academic background
- Education: Bryn Mawr College; Columbia University

Academic work
- Institutions: Northwestern University
- Notable works: Greek Art and the Orient

Ann C. Gunter is an art historian and Bertha and Max Dressler Professor in the Humanities at Northwestern University. Her work focuses on visual and material culture of the ancient Near East and neighboring parts of the eastern Mediterranean.

== Education ==
Gunter attended Bryn Mawr College, graduating magna cum laude in 1973. She went on to Columbia University where she earned an M.A. (1975), M.Phil. (1976) and Ph.D. (1980).

== Career ==
Gunter joined the Smithsonian Institution's Freer and Sackler galleries in 1987 as Assistant Curator of Ancient Near Eastern Art, and in 1992 was appointed Associate Curator. She was also a visiting assistant professor at Emory University and the University of Minnesota, Minneapolis. She was Director of the American Research Institute in Turkey at Ankara and an adjunct associate professor in Near Eastern Studies at Johns Hopkins University.

Gunter became Curator of Ancient Near Eastern Art at the Freer and Sackler in 2004 and served until 2008, while also serving as Head of Scholarly Publications and Programs. In 2008 she joined Northwestern University as Professor of Art History, Classics, and in the Humanities.

== Works ==
- Greek Art and the Orient (Cambridge University Press, 2009)
- "Beyond 'Orientalizing': Encounters among Cultures in the Eastern Mediterranean," in Assyria to Iberia at the Dawn of the Classical Age, eds. J. Aruz, S. B. Graff, and Y. Rakic (Metropolitan Museum of Art and Yale University Press, 2014)
- "Orientalism and Orientalization in the Iron Age Mediterranean" in Critical Approaches to Ancient Near Eastern Art, eds. B. A. Brown and M. H. Feldman (DeGruyter, 2014)
- "The Etruscans, Greek Art, and the Near East" in A Companion to the Etruscans, eds. S. Bell and A. Carpino (John Wiley & Sons, Inc., 2016)

== See also ==
- Massumeh Farhad
- Women in the art history field
