= Hiram Cox =

British diplomat (1760–1799)

Captain Hiram Cox (1760–1799) was a British diplomat, serving in Bengal and Burma in the 18th century. The city of Cox's Bazar in Bangladesh is named after him.

== Biography ==
As an officer of the East India Company, Cox was appointed Superintendent of Palongkee outpost after Warren Hastings became Governor of Bengal. Cox was specially mobilised to deal with a century-long conflict between Arakan refugees and local Rakhains (see Rakhine State). He embarked upon the task of rehabilitating refugees in the area and made significant progress. Cox died in 1799 before he could finish his work. To commemorate his role in rehabilitation work, a market was established and named after him: Cox's Bazar ("Cox's Market").

Cox was a member of the Asiatic Society, contributing scholarly articles on Asian culture to its journal Asiatic Researches. He is most noted for his long-debunked theory of the origin of chess as a four-player game, known as the Cox–Forbes theory.

== Family ==
Cox married Mary Fraser, daughter of Andrew Fraser of Inverness. Their son Henry Chambers Murray Cox was born in Calcutta in 1789. An officer of the Bengal Army, he was promoted to the rank of general in 1871, and died in 1876.

== See also ==
- Cox's Bazar
- Residents in Asia
