= Enochian chess =

Four-player chess variant

		a	b	c	d	e	f	g	h
									x3
8	x4	a8	b8	c8	d8	e8	f8	g8	h8		8
7		a7	b7	c7	d7	e7	f7	g7	h8		7
6		a6	b6	c6	d6	e6	f6	g6	h6		6
5		a5	b5	c5	d5	e5	f5	g5	h5		5
4		a4	b4	c4	d4	e4	f4	g4	h4		4
3		a3	b3	c3	d3	e3	f3	g3	h3		3
2		a2	b2	c2	d2	e2	f2	g2	h2		2
1		a1	b1	c1	d1	e1	f1	g1	h1	x2	1
		x1
		a	b	c	d	e	f	g	h

Enochian chess diagram

Enochian chess is a four-player chess variant, similar to chaturaji, associated with the Hermetic Order of the Golden Dawn. The name comes from the Enochian system of magic of Dr. John Dee (magus and astrologer to Elizabeth I), which was later adapted by Victorian members of the Golden Dawn into "a complete system of training and initiation".

== History ==
Enochian chess was created by William Wynn Westcott, one of the three founders of the Golden Dawn, but the rules of the game were probably never completed by him. The game was finished by S. L. MacGregor Mathers, who put its rules into final form.

== Description ==
The game was four-handed because each set of pieces corresponded to one of the four classical elements and their several watchtowers, and the game was used for divination as well as competition. The four sets of pieces were variously coloured, and identified with Egyptian deities or "god-forms". The main identifications of the pieces were:

- Osiris, represented by the king;
- Isis, the queen;
- Horus, the knight;
- Aroueris, the bishop; and
- Nephthys, the rook or castle.

The chessboard itself was also varicoloured, and divided into four sub-boards in which each of one of the four elemental colours predominated. The rules of the game were partially derived from shatranj and other historical forms of chess; the queen is played like an alfil, with a two-square diagonal leaping move. The four players would form pairs of two, with each player having a partner. MacGregor Mathers, who finalised the game's rules, was known to play with an invisible partner he claimed was a spirit. Joseph Hone, biographer of William Butler Yeats, claimed, "Mathers would shade his eyes with his hands and gaze at the empty chair at the opposite corner of the board before moving his partner's piece."

The game, while complex, was in actual use; Georgie Yeats, wife of poet William Butler Yeats, relates actually playing the game as a part of her occult training in Golden Dawn circles. Her husband took part in some of these games, as did MacGregor Mathers.
