= Chaturanga (disambiguation) =

Chaturanga is an ancient Indian game, the ancestor of chess.

Chaturanga may also refer to:

- Chaturanga (film), a 2008 Bengali film directed by Suman Mukherjee
- Chaturanga (Tagore novel), a 1916 novel by Rabindranath Tagore
- Chaturanga (Neelakantan novel), a 2020 historical fiction novel by Indian author Anand Neelakantan
- Chaturanga Dandasana, an asana pose in yoga practice
- Chaturaji, a four-player version of chaturanga
- Shatranj, a variant of chaturanga, predecessor of chess

== See also ==
- Chathuranga, a Sinhalese name
- Catur (disambiguation)
- Chathurangam (disambiguation)
- Sadhurangam (disambiguation)
- Chess (disambiguation)
- Chadarangam, a version of Indian chess
- Chadarangam (web series), an Indian webseries on Zee5
- Shatranj (1969 film), 1969 Indian film by S. S. Vasan
- Shatranj (1993 film), 1993 Indian film
- Shatranj ke Khiladi, a 1924 short-story by Indian writer Munshi Premchand
  - Shatranj Ke Khiladi (film), film adaptation by Satyajit Ray
- Turiya or caturiya, in concept in Hindu philosophy
