= Harshacharita =

Biography of Indian emperor Harsha by Banabhatta

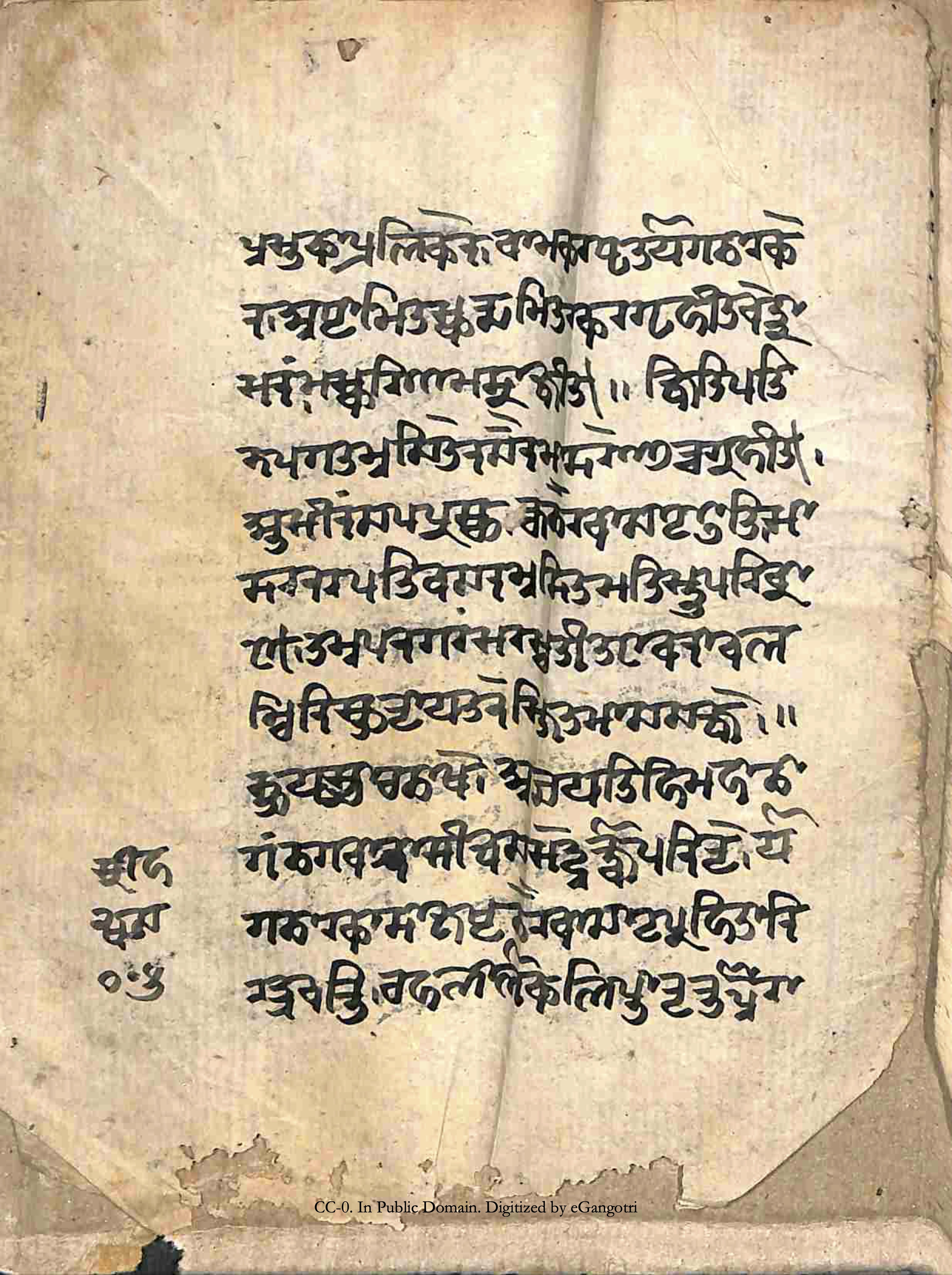
- Folio of a manuscript of the Harshacharita by Banabhatta, written in Sharada script
- Author: Banabhatta

The Harshacharita (Sanskrit: हर्षचरित, Harṣacarita; English: The deeds of Harsha) is the biography of Indian emperor Harsha by Banabhatta, also known as Bana, who was a Sanskrit writer of seventh-century CE India. He was the court poet of Harsha. The Harshacharita was the first composition of Bana and is considered to be the beginning of writing of historical poetic works in the Sanskrit language.

== Historical Biography ==
The Harshacharita ranks as the first historical biography in Sanskrit although it is written in a florid and fanciful style. Bana's detailed and vivid descriptions of rural India's natural environment as well as the extraordinary industry of the Indian people exudes the vitality of life at that time. Since he received the patronage of the emperor Harsha, his descriptions of his patron are not an unbiased appraisal and presents the emperor's actions in an overly favourable light.

== Contents ==
The Harṣacharita, written in ornate poetic prose, narrates the biography of the emperor Harsha in eight ucchvāsas (chapters). In the first two ucchvāsas, Bana gives an account of his ancestry and his early life. He was the great emperor.

The earliest clear reference for chaturanga (the common ancestor of the board games chess, chatrang (Persian chess), xiangqi (Chinese chess), janggi (Korean chess), shogi (Japanese), sittuyin (Burmese chess), makruk (Thai chess) and modern Indian chess) comes from Harshacharitha:

Under this monarch [...], only the bees quarrelled to collect the dew; the only feet cut off were those of measurements, and only from Ashtâpada one could learn how to draw up a chaturanga, there was no cutting-off of the four limbs of condemned criminals...

== Commentaries ==
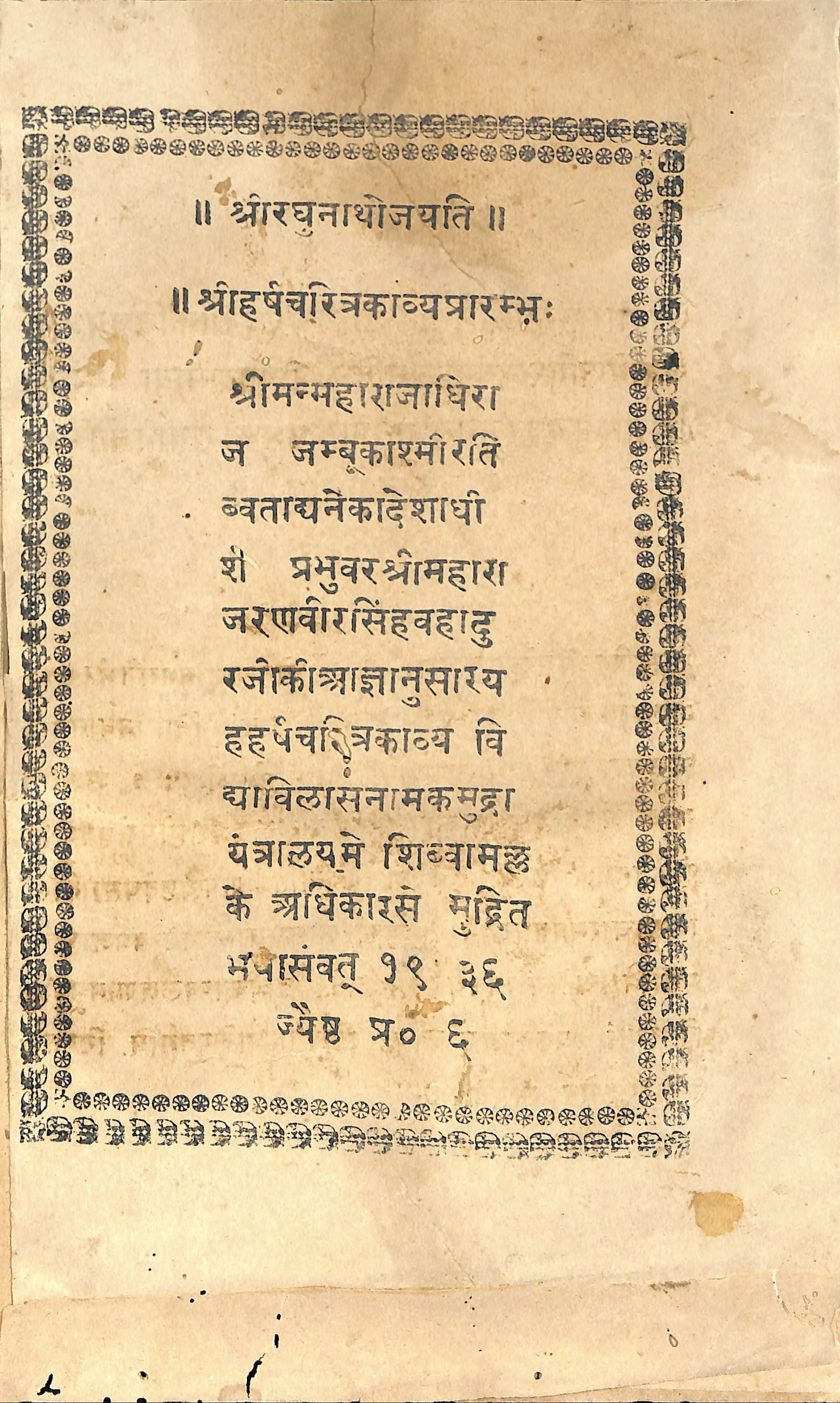
Title-page of a Harshacharita commentary published by Maharaja Ranbir Singh of Jammu and Kashmir State, via the Vidya Vilas Press, Jammu, 1880

The only commentary available is the Sanketa written by Shankara, a scholar from Kashmir. It seems that Ruyyaka also wrote a commentary known as the Harsacaritavartika, which has not yet been found.

The work was translated into English by Edward Byles Cowell and Frederick William Thomas in 1897. The military historian Kaushik Roy describes Harshacharita as "historical fiction" but with a factually correct foundation.

This work was translated into Telugu prose by M. V. Ramanachari (Medepalli Venkata Ramanacharyulu) of Maharajah's College, Vizianagaram in 1929.

== See also ==
- Ashokavadana
- Prithviraj Raso
- Akbarnama
- Vikramaditya
