= Catur =

Catur means "four" in Sanskrit, and may refer to:

- Chaturanga, an ancient Indian strategy board game
- Turiya, pure consciousness in Hindu philosophy
- Catur sloki, term for important verses in Indian scriptures

== See also ==
- Chaturanga (disambiguation)
