= Chadarangam =

Telugu version of Indian chess

Position: a8 black elephant, b8 black knight, c8 black bishop, d8 black queen, e8 black king, f8 black bishop, g8 black knight, h8 black elephant, a7 black pawn, b7 black pawn, c7 black pawn, d7 black pawn, e7 black pawn, f7 black pawn, g7 black pawn, h7 black pawn, a2 white pawn, b2 white pawn, c2 white pawn, d2 white pawn, e2 white pawn, f2 white pawn, g2 white pawn, h2 white pawn, a1 white elephant, b1 white knight, c1 white bishop, d1 white queen, e1 white king, f1 white bishop, g1 white knight, h1 white elephant

Chadarangam initial position. First row: Enugu, Gurramu, Sakatamu/Bishop, Mantri, Raju, Sakatamu, Gurramu, Enugu. Second row: Bantlu.

Chadarangam (Telugu: చదరంగము) is a Telugu version of Indian chess, Chaturanga. It became very famous among kings and courtesans. Previously chariots (Ratha) were used in warfare, but in medieval times chariots were replaced by camels (Oṣṭra). So, the bishop in olden days was called Ratha / Śakaṭa and in medieval ages was called Oṣṭra.

== Etymology ==
This name may be derived from the Sanskrit word Chaturanga or Persian word Chatrang. The Sanskrit word Chaturanga has a direct meaning "having four limbs". But in a military context it has meaning "an entire army (comprising elephants, chariots, cavalry, and infantry)".

== The game pieces ==
=== Names ===
Chadaranga Pikkalu
Rāju (king)
Mantri (minister or queen)
Enugu (elephant or rook)
Śakaṭamu (chariot or bishop)
Gurramu (horse or knight)
Banṭu (foot-soldier or pawn)

Pieces will be of two colours: black (Nalla) and white (Tella). In Telugu, pieces are called pikka (plural – pikkalu). Each side has mainly six types of pieces, namely:

- Rāju (Rāja) / king
- Mantri (Mantri) / queen
- Śakaṭam (Ratha) / bishop
- Gurram (Aśva) / knight
- Enugu (Gaja) / rook
- Banṭu (Sainika) / pawn

=== Movements ===
Their movements are designed accordingly in the Chadarangam as:

- Rāju moves orthogonally or diagonally only one square at a time.
- Mantri moves orthogonally or diagonally, any number of squares.
- Śakaṭamu/Śagaṭu moves diagonally any number of squares and thus is colorbound.
- Gurramu normal L-shaped jumping move (two spaces in one direction and one space orthogonally to it). It is the only piece that can jump over other pieces.
- Enugu moves orthogonally to the players (forward, backward, left or right) any number of squares.
- Banṭu/Bhatudu moves one space straight forward (away from the player). On its first move it can optionally move two spaces forward. If there is an enemy piece diagonally (either left or right) one space in front of the pawn, the pawn may move diagonally to capture that piece.

=== Significance ===
Pieces	Symbol	Value
Banṭu		1
Gurramu		3
Śagaṭu		3
Enugu		6
Mantri		13

The position and movements of pieces (Anga) correctly suit the reality of Indian warfare:

- Rāju (king) is the most powerful, but often won't come into action unless required. The knight-move (Gurrapu Ettu) of a king (Rāja) resembles the escape of a king for a safer location at the most crucial time (Āpaddharma kāla) in warfare.
- Mantri (queen) is the next most powerful person in an Indian empire/kingdom. Though the king only passes the decrees, actually it is the Prime Minister who actually decides all kinds of acts and strategies that are required for the welfare of the king/kingdom. (In Sanskrit, Mantri means Prime Minister.)
- Śakaṭamu (bishop) is known for their famous zig-zag movements while attacking. Often the opponent doesn't take into consideration the presence of chariots which in turn give stunning, often devastating blows in Indian warfare. (Actually Śakaṭa is a Sanskrit word meaning chariot.)
- Gurramu (knight) is known for its irregular jumping movements which often keeps the opponent in a dilemma for a moment. Even in the game it is the Gurramu (knight) that has a greater number of moves than any other piece. (In Telugu, Gurramu means horse.)
- Enugu (rook) is known for straightforward devastating attacks. Often the opponent knows its advance but cannot escape. In olden days Enugu (rook) played a very important role in scattering the army of an enemy, thereby making them deviate from their strategic movements. (In Telugu, Enugu means elephant.)
- Banṭu (pawn) (also known as Bhaṭuḍu) is a piece with lowest significance though larger in number than any other piece. But when a Banṭu reaches the other end, then the honour of that position, except that of Rāju (king), is given in traditional Indian chess. Surprisingly, it is similar to the honouring of a soldier for having fought exceptionally well in a war, by a king.

== Some important rules ==
- Always the white king (Tella Rāju) should be on a black square (Nalla Gaḍi) and the black king (Nalla Rāju) should be on a white square (Tella Gaḍi).
- Though defeating the opponent is the main aim, honouring the opponent's king is also very important. I.e., the game becomes very complex, if all the king's premier army is killed (the four limbs, Chatur+Anga) without using good strategy.
- Either checkmate or stalemate (Rāja digbhandanam) is considered a win. In other cases, it is considered as a draw.

== Terminology ==
In Telugu:

- a move is called Ettu (here "t" is pronounced as "t" in Telugu)
- checkmate is called Āṭakaṭṭu
- stalemate is called Āṭataṭṭu
- check is called Rāju
- square is called Gaḍi
- piece is called Pikka
- White is called Tella
- Black is called Nalla

== Valuations ==
The value of:

- a Mantri is equal to 2 Enugulu and a single Banṭu
- a Enugu is equal to a single Śagaṭu and 3 Banṭlu or a single Gurramu and 3 Banṭlu
- a Śagaṭu or a Gurramu is equal to 3 Banṭulu
- Banṭlu before Raju are more and Śagaṭu or Gurramu can be sacrificed in exchange for two such Banṭlu

== See also ==
- Origins of chess
- Indian chess
- Chaturaji—four-handed version of Chaturanga
