= Sadhurangam =

Sadhurangam may refer to:

- Sadhurangam (1978 film), a 1978 Indian Tamil-language film by Durai
- Sadhurangam (2011 film), a 2011 Indian Tamil-language political drama film by Karu Pazhaniappan

== See also ==
- Chaturanga (disambiguation)
- Sathuranga Vettai, a 2014 Indian Tamil-language film
