= Indian chess =

Chess variant played in India

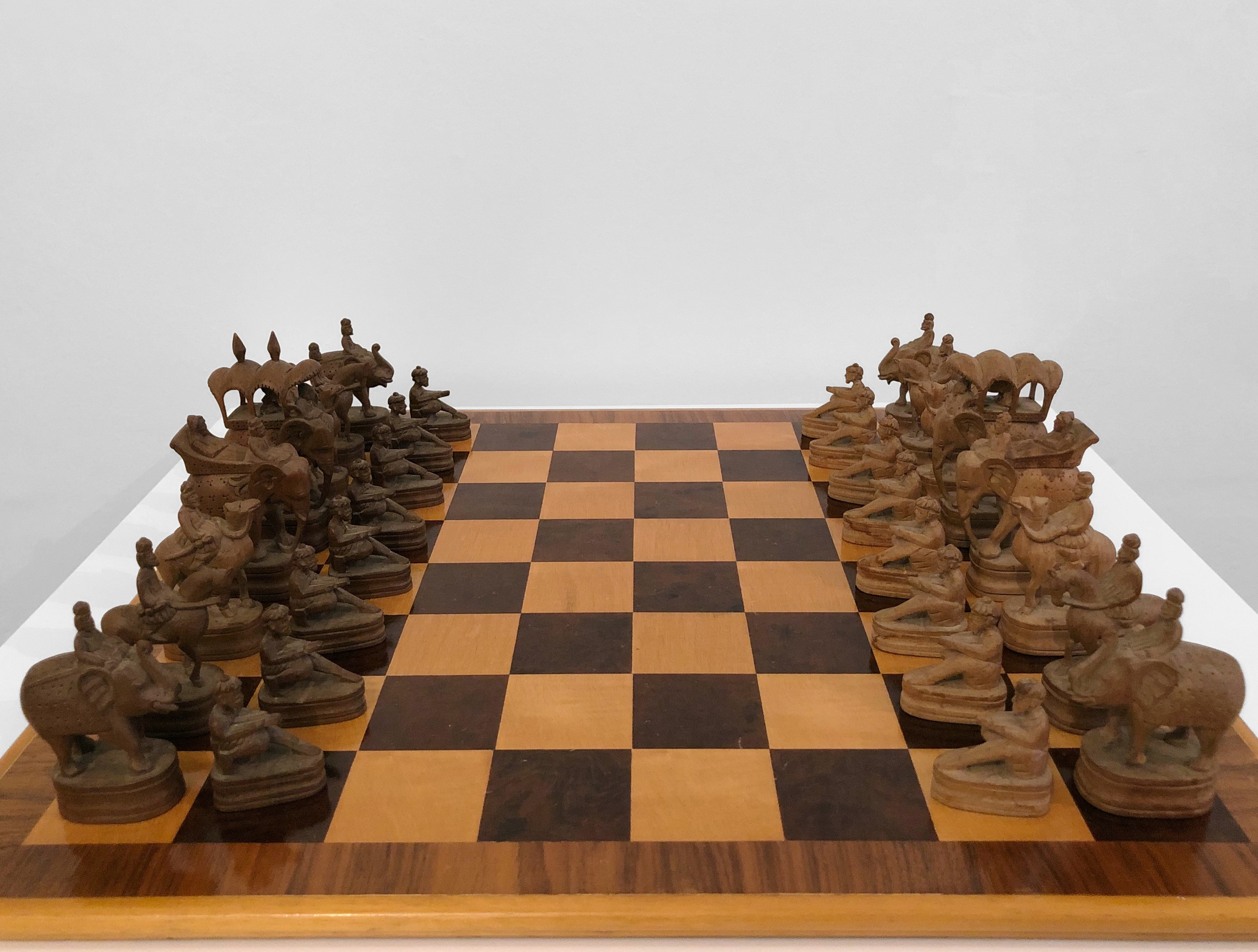
Antique Indian chess set depicting elephants, horses and camels

Indian chess is the name given to regional variations of chess played in India in the 18th and 19th centuries. It is distinct from chaturanga. There are several such variations, all quite similar to modern rules, with variants regarding castling, pawn promotion, etc.

== Differences from Western chess ==
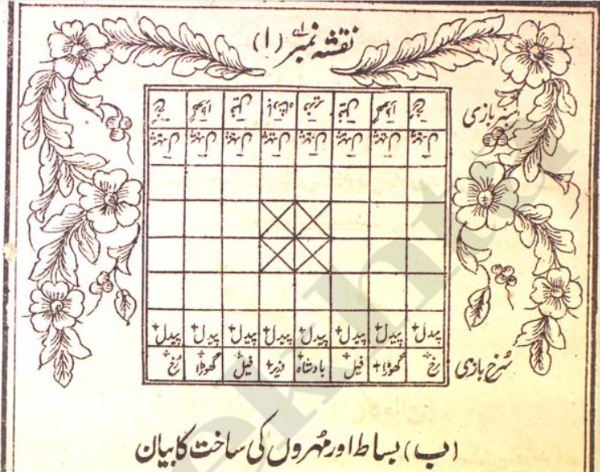
Arrangement of chessmen in Indian Chess on a chessboard in an Indian Chess Manual, the Muallim-ush-Shatranj Yar-e-Shatir (معلم الشطرنج یار شاطر), an exhaustive Urdu treatise authored in 1901 by Lala Raja Babu, the Superintendent of Palace Games for the Maharaja of Patiala. The two sides are stated surx bāzī (red) and sabz bāzī (green).

Position: a8 black rook, b8 black knight, c8 black bishop, d8 black king, e8 black queen, f8 black bishop, g8 black knight, h8 black rook, a7 black pawn, b7 black pawn, c7 black pawn, d7 black pawn, e7 black pawn, f7 black pawn, g7 black pawn, h7 black pawn, a2 white pawn, b2 white pawn, c2 white pawn, d2 white pawn, e2 white pawn, f2 white pawn, g2 white pawn, h2 white pawn, a1 white rook, b1 white knight, c1 white bishop, d1 white queen, e1 white king, f1 white bishop, g1 white knight, h1 white rook

Indian chess starting position, identical to the starting position of western chess except for the placement of the black king and queen

Position: a8 s g, b8 n g, c8 e g, d8 k g, e8 B g, f8 e g, g8 n g, h8 s g, a7 p g, b7 p g, c7 p g, d7 p g, e7 p g, f7 p g, g7 p g, h7 p g, a2 p r, b2 p r, c2 p r, d2 p r, e2 p r, f2 p r, g2 p r, h2 p r, a1 s r, b1 n r, c1 e r, d1 B r, e1 k r, f1 e r, g1 n r, h1 s r

Indian chess array: pieces are arranged in their traditional colours and faces, featuring the rook as a boat, minister as a ferz and elephant as an alfil. In many regional variants, however, these pieces adopt modern mobility, with the minister moving as a queen and the elephant as a bishop, rather than their restricted ancestral counterparts.
- The traditional pair of colours used are red and green. Red plays first. (This had remained unchanged within Persian Chatrang and Arab Shatranj too.) Even in some early modern chess sets from India where there were red and white pieces, Red always moved first.
- In the starting position, each king faces the opposing queen; from both players' viewpoints, their king is to the right of their queen, regardless of color. This is unlike western chess, where the kings face each other, as do the queens.
- The pawn's two-step initial move is absent in Indian chess; thus, the en passant capture is also absent. The pawn captures diagonally as Western chess.
- Normal castling with rook and king is absent. The unchecked king can make a knight's move once in a game, known as Indian castling or king's leap. This is used to make the king jump into protected wall of pawns of pieces, conceptually similar to castling.
- Moves of Queen and Bishop: In late 19th and 20th-century iterations of traditional Indian chess, European influence largely standardised the moves of the minister (queen) and elephant (bishop) to align with international modern standard; however, contemporary manuals do mention that, traditionally, these were the weakest pieces on the board: the minister (as its successor ferz) was limited to a single-step diagonal move, while the elephant (bishop) acted as an alfil, jumping exactly two squares diagonally and leaping over intervening pieces. These are the same moves mentioned in Mānasollāsa. The boat/chariot (rook), king, horse (knight) and pawn moves are the same.
- On reaching the opposite end of the board, a pawn is promoted to a piece of the type that began on that square. If it is promoted on the king's initial position, it is promoted to a queen. (On the contrary, in Chaturanga, as per Caturangadīpikā, the pawn becomes permanently frozen if it reach the king's square called Siṁhāsana.)
- Frozen Pawns: Although not a universal mandate, regional variants of traditional Indian chess enforced a strict conservation of pieces, likely dictated by the limitations of physical sets, ensuring a player could never exceed their initial material inventory. Consequently, should a pawn reach the final rank of a file whilst its corresponding piece type (such as both rooks, both knights, or the singular minister/queen) remains fully intact on the board, it enters a dormant, 'frozen' state. This immobile pawn remains vulnerable to capture as a standard pawn; however, should a piece of that corresponding type be subsequently lost, the frozen pawn instantly resurrects it without forfeiting a tempo, assuming the promoted piece's full capabilities on the ensuing turn. Thus, pawn promotion in this context operates fundamentally as piece resurrection. Notably, a pawn stationed on either bishop file may resurrect a bishop of either square colour, potentially resulting in two bishops navigating same-coloured diagonals; this illustrates that the law of material constancy governs solely the maximum quantity and type of pieces, rather than their specific positional or chromatic allocations.
- If there is only one piece remaining other than the kings, it may not be captured. Alternatively, it may be captured unless it is a pawn.
- When only the kings and pawns are left in play, the opponent may not give check, but they can win by stalemate. Alternatively, giving check is allowed, but the capture of the last pawn (which would result in a draw) is disallowed by the previous rule.
- The king cannot move until at least one check has been given, though this is a regional variation.

== Names of the pieces ==
The following table describes one version of Indian chess terminology for the various pieces (including Hindi and Urdu pronunciations; orange indicates most common terminology in Hindi, green indicates that in Urdu, and brown indicates most common in both; and the pink indicates the most common name in Bengali):

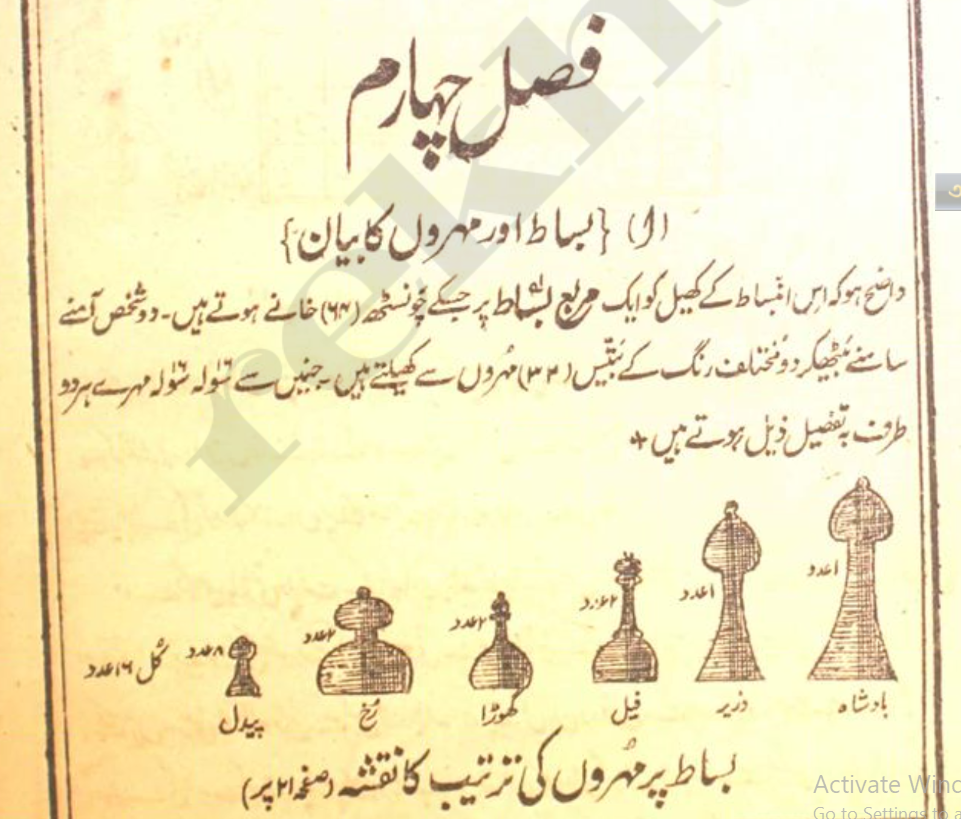
The names of chessmen as mentioned in Urdu in the book Muallim ush Shatranj, Yar i Shatir by Lala Raja Babu.

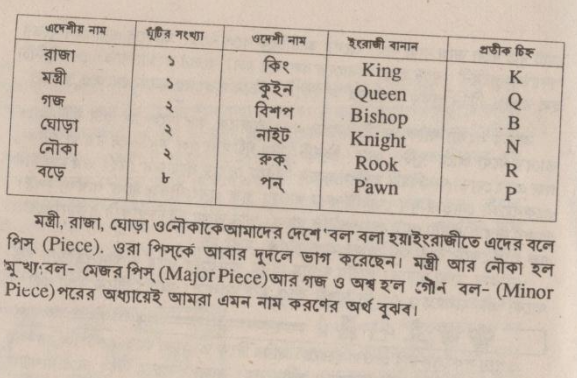
The names of chessmen in Bengali in the book Dabar Chal Chalte Hoy by grandmaster Dibyendu Barua.

Standard chess piece	Indian chess piece											
Standard chess piece	English	Sanskrit	Hindi	Urdu	ISO 15919	Other	Bengali	Marathi	Telugu	Malayalam	Tamil	Assamese
king	king	राजा	राजा	راجا	rājā		রাজা	राजा	రాజు	രാജാവ്	ராஜா/அரசன்	ৰজা
king	king	नृप, प्रभु	बादशाह	بادشاہ	bādśāh		মহারাজা	राजा	రాజు	രാജാവ്	ராஜா/அரசன்	ৰজা
queen	ferz/minister	मन्त्री	मन्त्री	منتری	mantrī		মন্ত্রী	वजीर	మంత్రి	മന്ത്രി		মন্ত্ৰী
queen	ferz/minister	प्रधान	वज़ीर/फ़र्ज़ीन	وزیر / فرزین	vazīr/farzīn		উজির	वजीर	మంత్రి	മന്ത്രി		মন্ত্ৰী
queen	dabbaba						দাবা					
queen	queen	राज्ञी, प्रभुसधर्मिणी	रानी	رانی	rānī		রানি	राणी		രാജ്ഞി	ராணி / அரசி	ৰাণী
queen	queen	राज्ञी, प्रभुसधर्मिणी	मलिका	ملکہ	malikā		মহারানি	राणी		റാണി	ராணி / அரசி	ৰাণী
queen	general	सेनापति	सेनापति	سیناپتی	sēnāpati							
rook	boat	नौका					নৌকা					নাওঁ
rook	boat	तरी	कश्ती	کشتی	kaśtī		না(ও)					নাওঁ
rook	rook/chariot	रथ	रथ	رتھ	rath		রথ			തേര്		
rook	rook/chariot	रथ	रुख़	رخ	rux	rukkha	রোক			തേര്		
rook	castle	दुर्ग	क़िला	قلعہ	qilā		কেল্লা/গড়				கோட்டை	
rook	elephant		हाथी	ہاتھی	hāthī			हत्ती	ఏనుగు		யானை	
knight	horse	घोटक	घोड़ा	گھوڑا	ghōṛā		ঘোড়া	घोडा	గుఱ్ఱము	കുതിര	குதிரை	ঘোঁৰা
knight	horse	अश्व, हय	अस्प	اسپ	asp		অশ্ব	घोडा	గుఱ్ఱము	കുതിര	குதிரை	ঘোঁৰা
bishop	alfil/elephant	कुञ्जर	फ़ील	فیل	fīl		পিল			ആന		হাতী
bishop	alfil/elephant	गज					গজ/হাতি			ആന		হাতী
bishop	camel	उष्ट्र	ऊँट	اونٹ	ū̃ṭ			उंट	ఒంటె			
bishop	chariot								శకటు			
bishop	minister										அமைச்சர்/மந்திரி	
pawn	footman/ infantryman	पदाति	पैदल	پیدل	paidal		পদাতিক/পত্তি/পাইক	प्यादे		കാലാള്‍ / പടയാളി	காலாள்	
pawn	footman/ infantryman	पत्ति	प्यादा	پیادہ	pyādā		পেয়াদা/ফৌজি	प्यादे		കാലാള്‍ / പടയാളി	காலாள்	
pawn	soldier	सैन्य/सैनिक	सैनिक	سینک	sainik		সৈন্য/সৈনিক		సిపాయి		சிப்பாய்	
pawn	soldier	सैन्य/सैनिक	सिपाही	سپاہی	sipāhī		সিপাই		సిపాయి		சிப்பாய்	
pawn	globule/pill	वटी/वटिक					বড়ে					
pawn	duckweed											পুণী

== See also ==
- Origins of chess
- Chaturaji, four-handed version of chaturanga
- Shatranj
- Xiangqi
