= Short assize =

Variant of chess

	a	b	c	d	e	f	g	h
8	a8	b8 black rook	c8 black bishop	d8 black king	e8	f8 black bishop	g8 black rook	h8	8
7	a7	b7	c7 black knight	d7	e7 black knight	f7	g7	h7	7
6	a6 black pawn	b6 black pawn	c6 black pawn	d6 black pawn	e6 Q d	f6 black pawn	g6 black pawn	h6 black pawn	6
5	a5	b5	c5	d5	e5	f5	g5	h5	5
4	a4	b4	c4	d4	e4	f4	g4	h4	4
3	a3 white pawn	b3 white pawn	c3 white pawn	d3 white pawn	e3 Q l	f3 white pawn	g3 white pawn	h3 white pawn	3
2	a2	b2	c2	d2 white knight	e2 white knight	f2	g2	h2	2
1	a1	b1 white rook	c1 white bishop	d1 white king	e1	f1 white bishop	g1 white rook	h1	1
	a	b	c	d	e	f	g	h

A short assize chess initial position

	a	b	c	d	e	f	g	h
8	a8	b8	c8 black bishop	d8	e8 black king	f8 black bishop	g8	h8	8
7	a7	b7	c7 black rook	d7 black knight	e7 black knight	f7 black rook	g7	h7	7
6	a6 black pawn	b6 black pawn	c6 black pawn	d6 black pawn	e6 Q d	f6 black pawn	g6 black pawn	h6 black pawn	6
5	a5	b5	c5	d5	e5	f5	g5	h5	5
4	a4	b4	c4	d4	e4	f4	g4	h4	4
3	a3 white pawn	b3 white pawn	c3 white pawn	d3 white pawn	e3 Q l	f3 white pawn	g3 white pawn	h3 white pawn	3
2	a2	b2	c2 white rook	d2 white knight	e2 white knight	f2 white rook	g2	h2	2
1	a1	b1	c1 white bishop	d1	e1 white king	f1 white bishop	g1	h1	1
	a	b	c	d	e	f	g	h

A short assize chess initial position

"The short assize" (French court assize = "short sitting") is H. J. R. Murray's name for a chess variant that was played in medieval Europe. It was somewhat like sittuyin but developed independently, probably to get the armies into contact sooner. It was current in England and Paris in the second half of the 12th century, and perhaps at other times and/or places.

The pieces started with the pawns on the third ranks, and the queen on the same square as the e-file pawn. These two pieces could not be moved together, and after that no two pieces of the same color could be on the same square together. But, before either moved, both could be captured together. After that, the usual rules of medieval chess (i.e. shatranj or similar) applied.

Murray records these two starting positions, and writes as if the players could choose the starting positions of their kings and bishops and knights and rooks. It is not known if the game had an initial setting-up stage like in sittuyin.

The ordinary European chess of the time was sometimes called the long assize to distinguish.

== Compare ==
- Sittuyin (Burmese traditional chess)
- Chess960
