= Chathurangam =

Chathurangam may refer to:

- Chathurangam, a 1959 Indian Malayalam-language film starring Prem Nazir and Sathyan
- Chathurangam, a 2002 Indian Malayalam-language film starring Mohanlal and Navya Nair

== See also ==
- Chaturanga (disambiguation)
