= Senterej =

Chess variant played in Ethiopia and Eritrea

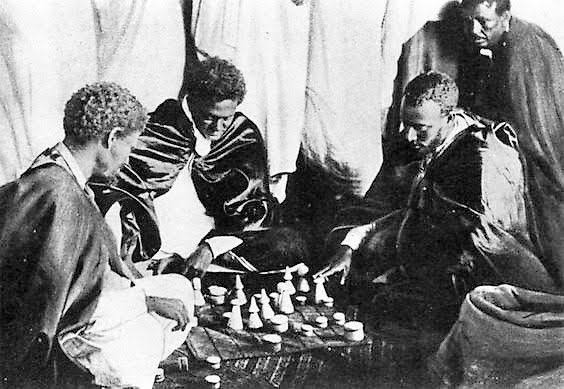
Ethiopian nobles "Dejazmatch Gebre Selassie" and "Dejazmatch Ali" playing chess in the early 20th century

Senterej (Amharic: ሰንጠረዥ sänṭäräž), also known as Ethiopian chess, is a regional chess variant, the form of chess traditionally played in Ethiopia and Eritrea. It was the last popular survival of shatranj. According to Richard Pankhurst, the game became extinct sometime after the Italian invasion of Ethiopia in the 1930s. A distinctive feature of Senterej is the opening phase – players make as many moves as they like without regard for how many moves the opponent has made; this continues until the first capture is made. Memorization of opening lines is therefore not a feature of the game.

== Rules ==
=== Pieces ===
	a	b	c	d	e	f	g	h
8	a8	b8	c8	d8	e8	f8	g8	h8	8
7	a7	b7	c7	d7	e7	f7	g7	h7	7
6	a6	b6	c6	d6	e6	f6	g6	h6	6
5	a5	b5	c5	d5	e5	f5	g5	h5	5
4	a4	b4	c4	d4	e4	f4	g4	h4	4
3	a3	b3	c3	d3	e3	f3	g3	h3	3
2	a2	b2	c2	d2	e2	f2	g2	h2	2
1	a1	b1	c1	d1	e1	f1	g1	h1	1
	a	b	c	d	e	f	g	h

Senterej starting position. Each king is to the right of its ferz (represented by queen).

Broadly, the pieces move the same way as in shatranj; however, there are regional variations.

- Each king (negus) stands just to the right of the centerline from its player's point of view. It moves one step in any direction as a chess king.
- At the left of the king stands the ferz, moving one square diagonally. (One source says it moves one step in any direction, but may only capture diagonally. There may have been regional variations.)
- On the flanks of the king and ferz stands a piece called the fil or alfil (saba). It leaps diagonally to the second square distant.
- Beside the fils stand the horsemen (feresenya), moving as chess knights.
- In the corners stand the rooks (der), moving as chess rooks.
- The second rank is filled with pawns (medeq), which move one step forward and capture one square diagonally forward. There is no first move double-step option, and therefore no en passant. A pawn reaching the farthest rank is promoted to ferz (one source says, to the rank of any piece already lost).

a5	b5	c5	d5	e5
a4	b4	c4	d4	e4
a3	b3	c3	d3	e3
a2	b2	c2	d2	e2
a1	b1	c1	d1	e1

Complementarity of the senterej pieces' movements, excluding king and pawn

The possible movements of the main senterej pieces, excluding that of the king and pawn, may complementary to one another, occupying, without any omission or redundancy, all available squares with regards to a central position inside a 5×5 grid, as shown in the figure to the right.

=== Gameplay ===
In Senterej both sides start playing at the same time without waiting for turns. The phase before first capture is called the "mobilization" or "marshalling" phase, or werera. Both players may move their pieces as many times as they like without concern for the number of moves the opponent makes. During this phase the players watch each other's moves, and retract their own and substitute others as they think best. They only start to take turns after the first capture.

The object of the game is to checkmate the opponent. A king denuded of all pieces (excluding pawns) cannot be mated; the game is drawn. A king with only a single piece supporting him (again excluding pawns) can only be mated before that piece has moved seven times, or else the game is drawn.

=== Game flow ===
1. Start game
2. Werera (mobilization or marshalling) phase: both players move piece(s) together at every step, until there is any piece captured
3. First piece captured, werera ends
4. Players move pieces by turns, until either:
  - One side win the game, in case of the opponent's king is being checkmated under the opponent has any pieces of ferz/alfil(s)/horse(s)/rook(s) still alive
  - Game drawn, in case of the opponent remains king and pawns only (or fits other house rules)
5. End game

== Customs ==
Traditionally, the board is not checkered, merely marked into squares; it is usually a red cloth, marked by strips of black or blue. The play is much more sociable than is usual in Western chess, with all the bystanders (even, formerly, slaves) calling out their notions of useful plays and moving the pieces about to demonstrate. The customs surrounding checkmate are numerous. Dealing the fatal blow with a rook or knight is considered inartistic. Delivering the fatal stroke with a ferz or fil is more respectable; with a combination of pawns, even more praiseworthy.
