= Chathuranga =

Chathuranga or Chaturanga is a Sinhalese name that may refer to the following people:

Surname

- Milinda Chathuranga (born 1991), Sri Lankan kabaddi player
- Pubudu Chathuranga (born 1982), Sri Lankan actor
- Ruwan Chathuranga (born 1989), Sri Lankan cricketer
- Sanjaya Chathuranga (born 1992), Sri Lankan cricketer
- Sanka Chathuranga (born 1996), Sri Lankan cricketer
- Vishva Chathuranga (born 1998), Sri Lankan cricketer

Forename

- Chaturanga de Silva (1990), Sri Lankan cricketer
- Chathuranga Dikkumbura (born 1990), Sri Lankan cricketer
- Chathuranga Kumara (born 1992), Sri Lankan cricketer
- Chaturanga Lakmal (born 1988), Sri Lankan weightlifter
- Chathuranga Sanjeewa (born 1991), Sri Lankan soccer player
- Chathuranga Silva (born 1993), Sri Lankan cricketer

== See also ==
- Chathuranga Vallabhanathar Temple, Hindu temple in Tamil Nadu, India
- Chaturanga (disambiguation)
