= Hastin =

Hastin (हस्तिन्) is a term for 'elephant' used in Vedic texts. Other terms for 'elephant' include Ibha (इभ) and Vārana (वारण).

== The elephant in the Rigveda ==
The Rigveda seems to refer to elephants (e.g. Bryant 2001: 323), an animal native to South Asia. It has been speculated that some of these verses might be references to domesticated elephants.

=== Mrga Hastin ===
In the Rigveda and in the Atharvaveda, the term is translated as 'elephant' (according to Keith and Macdonell, Roth and other scholars). In the Rigveda, Mrga Hastin (animal with a hand) occurs in RV 1.64.7 "hastinaḥ", and RV 4.16.14 "hastī".

=== Ibha ===
In Rigveda 1.84.17 "ibhāyota", 4.4.1 "ibhena", RV 9.57.3 "ibho", and RV 6.20.8 "ibhaṃ" mention ibhas, a term meaning 'servant, domestics, household' according to Roth, Ludwig, Zimmer and other Indologists. Other scholars like Pischel and Karl Friedrich Geldner translate the term as 'elephant'. According to Sayana, Mahidhara and the Nirukta, ibha is translated as 'elephant'. Megasthenes and Nearchos also connect ibha with 'elephant'. The term ibha is only used in the Samhitas, and especially in the Rigveda.

=== Varana ===
Another term that may mean 'elephant' is Varana (RV 8.33.8 "vāraṇaḥ", and 10.40.4 "vāraṇā"). According to Macdonell and Keith, Varana refers to elephants.

== The elephant in other Hindu texts ==
The Akananuru (27) and the Purananuru (389) state that elephants were raised and trained in ancient Tamilagam's northern boundary of Venkatam hills, Tirupati.

== See also ==
- Sacred cow
