= Chaturanga =

Ancient Indian strategy board game

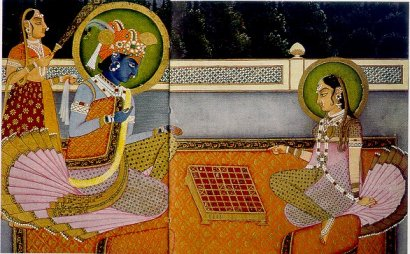
Krishna and Radha playing chaturanga on an 8×8 ashtāpada

Chaturanga (Sanskrit: चतुरङ्ग, IAST: caturaṅga, pronounced [tɕɐt̪uˈɾɐŋɡɐ]) is an ancient Indian strategy board game. It is first known from India around the seventh century CE.

While there is some uncertainty, the prevailing view among chess historians is that chaturanga is the common ancestor of the board games chess, xiangqi (Chinese), janggi (Korean), shogi (Japanese), sittuyin (Burmese), makruk (Thai), ouk chatrang (Cambodian) and modern Indian chess. It was adopted as chatrang (shatranj) in Sassanid Persia, which in turn was the form of chess brought to late-medieval Europe.

Not all the rules of chaturanga are known with certainty. Chess historians suppose that the game had rules similar to those of its successor, shatranj. In particular, there is uncertainty as to the moves of the gaja (elephant).

== Etymology ==
Sanskrit caturaṅga is a bahuvrihi compound word, meaning "having four limbs or parts" and in epic poetry often meaning "army". The name comes from a battle formation mentioned in the Indian epic Mahabharata. Chaturanga refers to four divisions of an army, namely elephantry, chariotry, cavalry and infantry. An ancient battle formation, akshauhini, is like the setup of chaturanga.

== History ==
=== Origin ===
The origin of chaturanga has been a puzzle for centuries. The earliest clear reference comes from north India from the Gupta Empire, dating from the sixth century AD. Banabhatta's Harsha Charitha (c. AD 625) contains the earliest reference to the name chaturanga:

Under this monarch [...], only the bees quarreled to collect the dew; the only feet cut off were those of measurements, and only from Ashtâpada one could learn how to draw up a chaturanga, there was no cutting-off of the four limbs of condemned criminals...

According to Stewart Culin, chaturanga was first described in the Hindu text Bhavishya Purana. The Bhavishya Purana is known to include modern additions and interpolations, however, even mentioning British rule of India.

An early reference to an ancient Indian board game is sometimes attributed to Subandhu in his Vasavadatta, dated between the 5th and 7th centuries AD:

The time of the rains played its game with frogs for pieces [nayadyutair] yellow and green in colour, as if mottled by lac, leapt up on the black field squares.

The colours are not those of the two camps, but mean that the frogs have two colours, yellow and green.

Chaturanga may also have much older roots, dating back 5,000 years. Archeological remains from 2000 to 3000 BC have been found from the city of Lothal (of the Indus Valley Civilisation) of pieces on a board that resemble chess. Another argument for chaturanga being older is the fact that the chariot is the most powerful piece on the board, although chariots appear to have been obsolete in warfare for at least five or six centuries, superseded by light and heavy cavalries. The counterargument is that they remained prominent in literature and continued to be used for travel and transport, in processions, for games, and in races.

=== Spread outside India ===
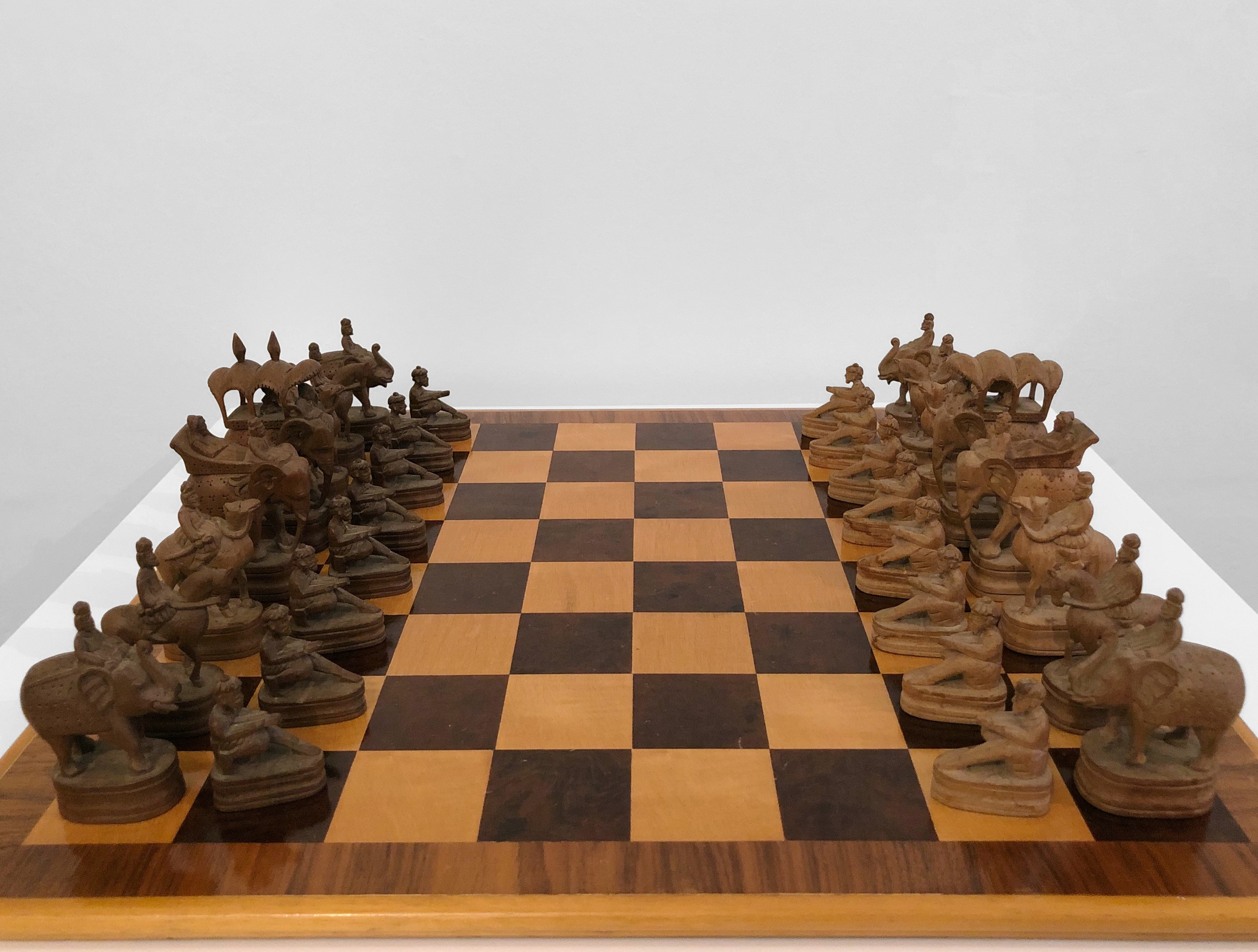
Chess set from Rajasthan, India

While there is some uncertainty, the prevailing view among chess historians is that chaturanga is the common ancestor of the board games chess, xiangqi (Chinese), janggi (Korean), shogi (Japanese), sittuyin (Burmese), makruk (Thai), ouk chatrang (Cambodian) and modern Indian chess.

In Arabic, most of the terminology of chess is derived directly from chaturanga: Modern chess itself is called shatranj in Arabic, and the bishop is called the elephant. The Tamerlane chess was also introduced in Iran later.

The game was first introduced to the West in Thomas Hyde's De ludis orientalibus libri duo, published in 1694. Subsequently, translations of Sanskrit accounts of the game were published by Sir William Jones.

== The game ==
=== Set-up ===
	a	b	c	d	e	f	g	h
8	a8	b8	c8	d8	e8	f8	g8	h8	8
7	a7	b7	c7	d7	e7	f7	g7	h7	7
6	a6	b6	c6	d6	e6	f6	g6	h6	6
5	a5	b5	c5	d5	e5	f5	g5	h5	5
4	a4	b4	c4	d4	e4	f4	g4	h4	4
3	a3	b3	c3	d3	e3	f3	g3	h3	3
2	a2	b2	c2	d2	e2	f2	g2	h2	2
1	a1	b1	c1	d1	e1	f1	g1	h1	1
	a	b	c	d	e	f	g	h

Ashtāpada, an uncheckered 8×8 board, sometimes with special markings, on which chaturanga was played

Chaturanga was played on an 8×8 uncheckered board called ashtāpada, which is also the name of a game. The board sometimes had special markings, the meaning of which are unknown today. These marks were not related to chaturanga, but were drawn on the board by tradition. These special markings coincide with squares unreachable by any of the four gajas that start on the board due to movement rules. Chess historian H. J. R. Murray conjectured that the ashtāpada was also used for some old race-type dice game, perhaps similar to chowka bhara, in which the marks had meaning.

=== Rules ===
The initial position is as shown. White moves first. The objective in chaturanga is for one side (say 'white') to checkmate the opponent's raja (king) or to reduce the other side (say 'black') to just the raja ('bare king'), although if on the following move the black side can also reduce the white side to 'bare king', the game is drawn.

	a	b	c	d	e	f	g	h
8	a8	b8	c8	d8	e8	f8	g8	h8	8
7	a7	b7	c7	d7	e7	f7	g7	h7	7
6	a6	b6	c6	d6	e6	f6	g6	h6	6
5	a5	b5	c5	d5	e5	f5	g5	h5	5
4	a4	b4	c4	d4	e4	f4	g4	h4	4
3	a3	b3	c3	d3	e3	f3	g3	h3	3
2	a2	b2	c2	d2	e2	f2	g2	h2	2
1	a1	b1	c1	d1	e1	f1	g1	h1	1
	a	b	c	d	e	f	g	h

Chaturanga starting setup. The raja do not face each other: the white raja starts on e1; the black raja on d8.

=== Pieces and their moves ===
Chaturanga pieces
Images	Name
	raja (king)
	mantri (minister) or senāpati (general) (ferz; early form of queen)
	ratha or sakaṭa (chariot; rook)
	gaja or hastin (elephant; later called alfil; early form of bishop)
	aśva (horse; knight)
	padàti, bhata, or sainika (foot-soldier or infantry; pawn)

- Raja (king): moves one step in any direction (vertical, horizontal or diagonal), the same as the king in chess. There is no castling in chaturanga.
  - The general in Chinese xiangqi lacks diagonals, which might be the earliest move of the raja. The minority view that chaturanga developed from a form of xiangqi implies such an evolution, but it is also logical to assume such a move as the case for an Indian proto-chaturanga.
- Mantri (minister); also known as senapati (general): moves one step diagonally in any direction, like the ferz in shatranj.
- Ratha (chariot) (also known as sakaṭa) moves the same as a rook in chess: horizontally or vertically, through any number of unoccupied squares, with the only difference being the lack of castling.
- Gaja (elephant) (also known as hasti). Three different moves are described in ancient literature:
  1. Two squares in any diagonal direction, jumping over the first square, as the alfil in Iranian shatranj, Ethiopian senterej, Mongolian Tamerlane chess and medieval courier chess. This is a fairy chess piece that is a (2,2)-leaper.
    - The same move is used for the boat in Indian chaturaji, a four-player version of chaturanga.
    - The elephant in Chinese xiangqi has the same move, but is not able to jump over an intervening piece or pawn.
    - The elephant in Korean janggi has the same move, but outward from an initial orthogonal step, also without the ability to jump over an intervening piece or pawn.
  2. One step straight forward or one step in any diagonal direction.
    - The same move is used for the khon (nobleman) in Thai makruk and the sin (elephant) in Burmese sittuyin, as well as for the silver general in Japanese shogi.
    - The move was described c. 1030 by Biruni in his book India.
  3. Two squares in any orthogonal (vertical or horizontal) direction, jumping over the first square; raising the questions of whether the one step diagonally forward or one step in any orthogonal direction move for the gold general in Japanese shogi is a Japanese invention and whether the camel’s (1,3) move is, according to tradition, Tamerlane’s invention.
    - A piece with such a move is called a dabbābah in some chess variants. The move was described by the Arabic chess master al-Adli c. 840 in his (partly lost) chess work. (The Arabic word dabbāba in former times meant a covered siege engine for attacking walled fortifications; today it means "army tank".)
    - This is reminiscent of the aforementioned chaturaji, where the elephant moves as a rook.
    - The German historian Johannes Kohtz (1843–1918) suggests, rather, that this was the earliest move of the Ratha.
- Ashva (horse): moves the same as a knight in chess.
- Padati or Bhata (foot-soldier or infantry); also known as sainika (warrior): moves and captures the same as a pawn in chess, but without a double-step option on the first move. The padati can promote only to a mantri when it reaches the last rank, although this is slightly debated.

=== Additional rules ===
Al-Adli mentions two further rules:

- Stalemate was a win for the stalemated player. This rule appeared again in some medieval chess variants in England c. 1600. According to some sources, there was no stalemate, as the king is forced to move and consequently be captured.
- The player that is first to bare the opponent's king (i.e. capture all enemy pieces except the king) wins. In shatranj this is also a win, but only if the opponent cannot bare the player's king on the next turn.

== See also ==
- Chess in early literature
- Liubo – Ancient Chinese board game for two players
- Origins of chess
