= Makruk =

Chess variant

Position: A8 black boat, B8 black horse, C8 black nobleman, D8 black seed, E8 black feudal, F8 black nobleman, G8 black horse, H8 black boat, A6 black cell, B6 black cell, C6 black cell, D6 black cell, E6 black cell, F6 black cell, G6 black cell, H6 black cell, A3 white cell, B3 white cell, C3 white cell, D3 white cell, E3 white cell, F3 white cell, G3 white cell, H3 white cell, A1 white boat, B1 white horse, C1 white nobleman, D1 white feudal, E1 white seed, F1 white nobleman, G1 white horse, H1 white boat
Makruk starting position
- Years active: Unknown, predates sittuyin
- Genres: Board game; Abstract strategy game
- Players: 2
- Setup time: < 1 minute
- Playing time: From 20 mins to several hours
- Chance: None
- Skills: Strategy, tactics
- Synonyms: Thai chess

Makruk (Thai: หมากรุก; RTGS: mak ruk; pronounced [màːk rúk]), or Thai chess (Thai: หมากรุกไทย; RTGS: mak ruk thai; pronounced [màːk rúk tʰaj]), is a strategy board game that is descended from the 6th-century Indian game of chaturanga or a close relative thereof, and is therefore related to chess. It is part of the family of chess variants.

In Cambodia, where a similar game is played, it is known as ouk (Khmer: អុក, pronounced [ʔok]) or ouk chatrang (Khmer: អុកចត្រង្គ, pronounced [ʔok.caʔ.ˈtrɑŋ]).

== Origin ==
The Persian traders came to the Ayutthaya kingdom around the 14th century to spread their culture and to trade with the Thai kingdom. It is therefore possible that the Siamese makruk, in its present form, was directly derived from the Persian game of shatranj via the cultural exchange between the two peoples in this period. This is because the movement of makruk's queen, or the "seed" (Thai: เม็ด), is essentially the same as the ferz in shatranj.

It is more likely, however, that the game came more directly from India given the name similarities between chaturanga and the Cambodian name, ouk chaktrang (Khmer: អុកចត្រង្គ), and the way the "nobleman" (Thai: โคน, Khmer: គោល) moves. In his History of Chess, Murray suggests it may have followed the expansion of Buddhism in the area.

== Pieces ==
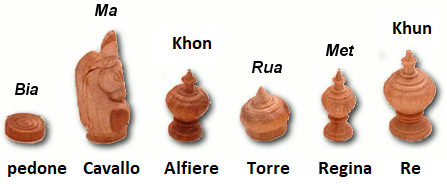
Makruk pieces

The design of the makruk pieces is distinctly different from Western chess pieces. The horse is noticeably the largest piece while the pawns resemble checker pieces. The other pieces have a distinct bulbous shape.

English	king (1)	queen (1)	bishop (2)	knight (2)	rook (2)	pawn (8)	promoted pawn (queen)
Thai	ขุน	เม็ด	โคน	ม้า	เรือ	เบี้ย	เบี้ยหงาย
RTGS	khun	met	khon	ma	ruea	bia	bia-ngai
Meaning	lord	seed	nobleman	horse	boat	cowrie shell	overturned cowrie shell

In the starting position, cowrie are placed on the third and sixth ranks. Seeds are placed at the right side of lords.

== Rules ==
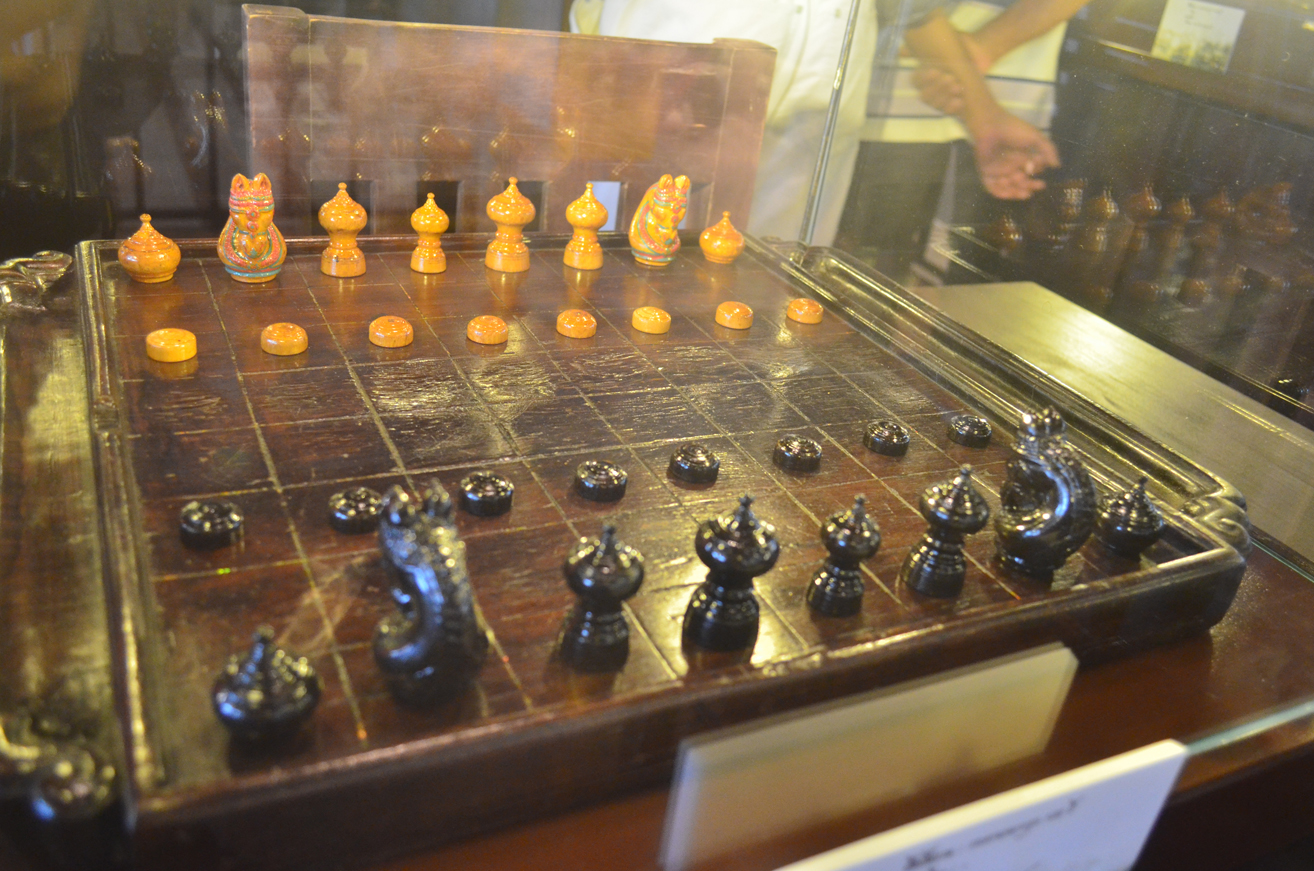
Makruk set from the early 20th century

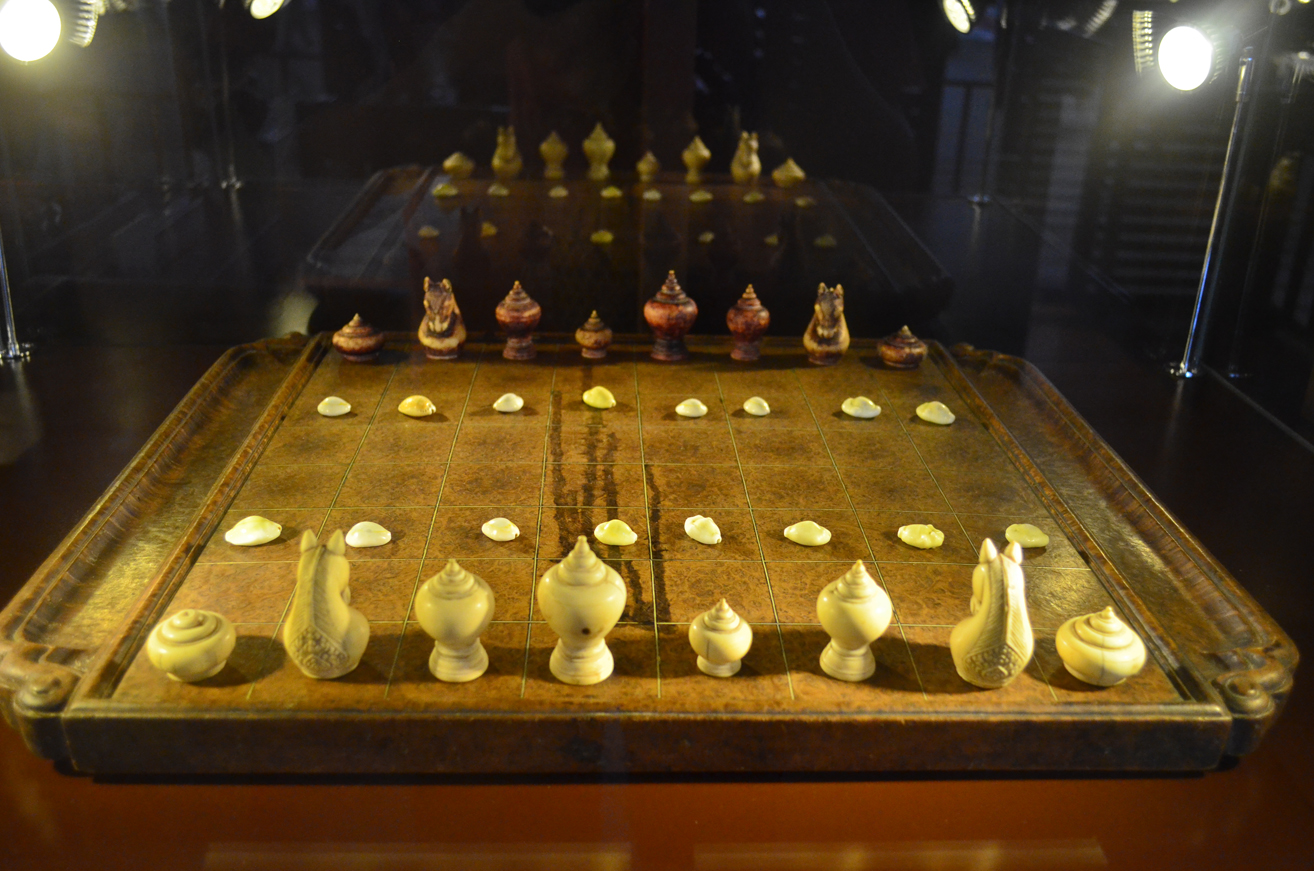
Makruk set from the early 19th century; the pawns are made from cowrie shells

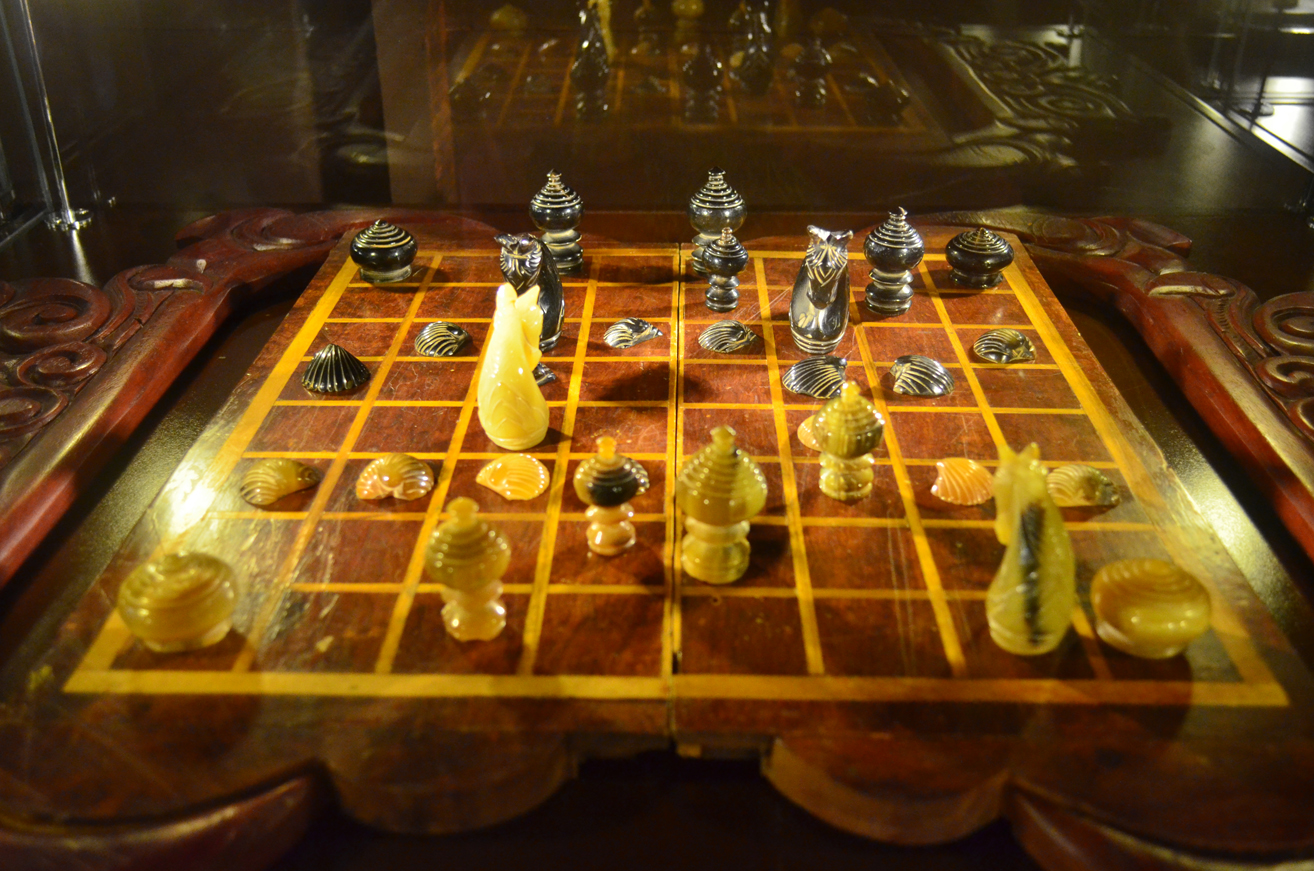
Makruk set from early Rattanakosin era (late 18th century) with pieces made from albino and black water buffalos' horn

- The cowrie shell moves one space forward and captures one space diagonally forward. Unlike in Western chess, the cowrie cannot advance two spaces on its first move; therefore, there is no en passant capture in makruk. A cowrie that reaches its sixth rank is always promoted. It becomes a "promoted pawn" (เบี้ยหงาย bia-ngai, in Thai, meaning overturned cowrie shell), which moves one space diagonally in any direction, like the seed. Cowrie promotion is usually denoted by flipping the piece over.

○	●	○
	บ	

- The seed moves or captures one space diagonally, like the ferz in shatranj. It has the same move as the overturned cowrie.

●		●
	ม็	
●		●

- The nobleman moves or captures one space diagonally or one space forward, like the silver general in shogi.

●	●	●
	ค	
●		●

- The horse moves or captures two spaces orthogonally (that is, along a rank or file) and then one space perpendicular to that movement. It jumps over any pieces in the way, like the knight in Western chess.

	●		●	
●				●
		ม		
●				●
	●		●	

- The boat moves or captures any number of spaces orthogonally, like a rook in Western chess.

		│		
		│		
─	─	ร	─	─
		│		
		│		

- The lord moves or captures one space in any direction, like a king in Western chess. The game ends when the lord is checkmated. The game ends as a draw if the lord is stalemated, like in Western chess and unlike shatranj.

●	●	●
●	ข	●
●	●	●

=== Counting rules ===
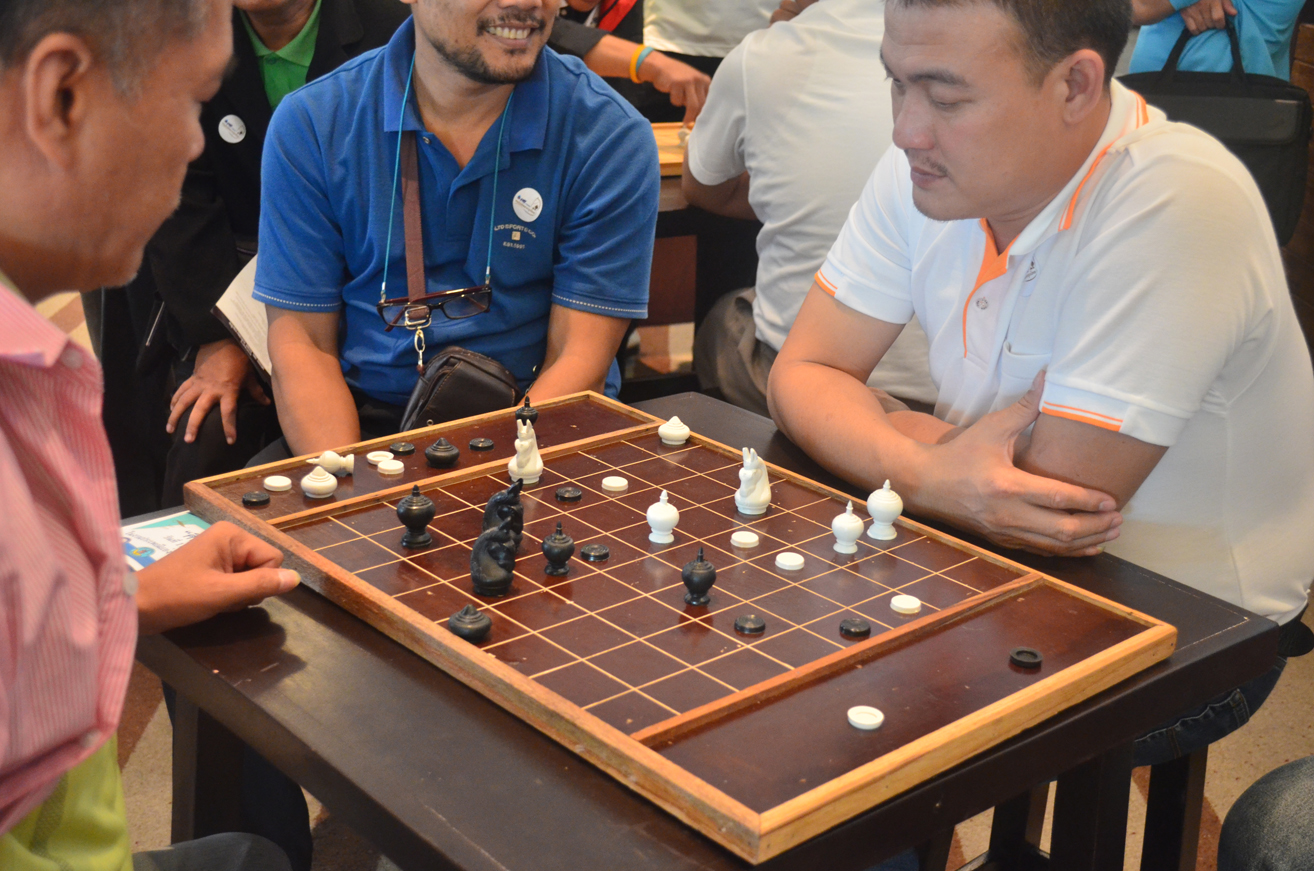
Thai men playing makruk

When neither side has any cowries, the game must be completed within a certain number of moves or it is declared a draw. When a piece is captured the count restarts only if it is the last piece of a player in the game.

- When neither player has any cowries left, mate must be achieved in 64 moves. The disadvantaged player counts, and may at any time choose to stop counting. If the disadvantaged player checkmates the advantage side and did not stop counting, the game is declared a draw.

When the last piece (that is not the lord) of the disadvantaged player is captured, the count may be started, or restarted from the aforementioned counting, by the weaker player, and the stronger player now has a maximum number of moves based on the pieces left:

- If there are two boats left: 8 moves
- If there is one boat left: 16 moves
- If there are no boats left, but there are two noblemen: 22 moves
- If there are no boats or noblemen left, but there are two horses: 32 moves
- If there are no boats left, but there is one nobleman: 44 moves
- If there are no boats or noblemen left, but there is one horse: 64 moves
- If there are no boats, noblemen or horses left, but only seeds: 64 moves

The disadvantaged player announces the counting of his fleeing moves, starting from the number of pieces left on the board, including both lords. The winning player has to checkmate his opponent's lord before the maximum number is announced, otherwise the game is declared a draw. During this process, the count may restart if the counting player would like to stop and start counting again.

For example, if White has two boats and a horse against a lone black lord, he has three moves to checkmate his opponent (the given value of 8 minus the total number of pieces, 5). If Black captures a white boat, the count does not automatically restart, unless Black is willing to do so, at his own disadvantage. However, many players do not understand this and restart the counting while fleeing with the lord.

=== Variants ===
There are rules that do not apply to the standard, formal game, or have been abandoned in professional play. They are called sutras. The first free moves are similar to those in Cambodian ouk.

- Sut Khun สูตรขุน ("King Sutra") can be compared to the castling rule in Western chess. The rule allows the player to move the lord to a blank space on next row, like a horse, so long as the lord has not yet moved.
- Sut Met สูตรเม็ด ("Queen Sutra") is the most popular sutra in informal rules. It is a first free move that allows the player to move the seed and the cowrie in front of the seed at the same time. Two pieces are moved in this sutra. First, move the cowrie in front of the seed forward; then move the seed to the blank space the cowrie has just vacated, so the seed moves two spaces forward.
- Sut Ma สูตรม้า ("Knight Sutra") is a first free move that allows the player to move a horse and a cowrie a horse's move from that horse in the same turn. Two pieces are moved in this sutra. First, move the cowrie which is a horse's move from the horse forward; then move the horse to the blank space the cowrie has just vacated.
- Takhaeng Ruea ตะแคงเรือ ("Boat Tilting, Rook Tilting") involves turning one or both boats upside down. This changes the boat to be a seed. This reduces the power of one or two boats.

== Cambodian chess ==
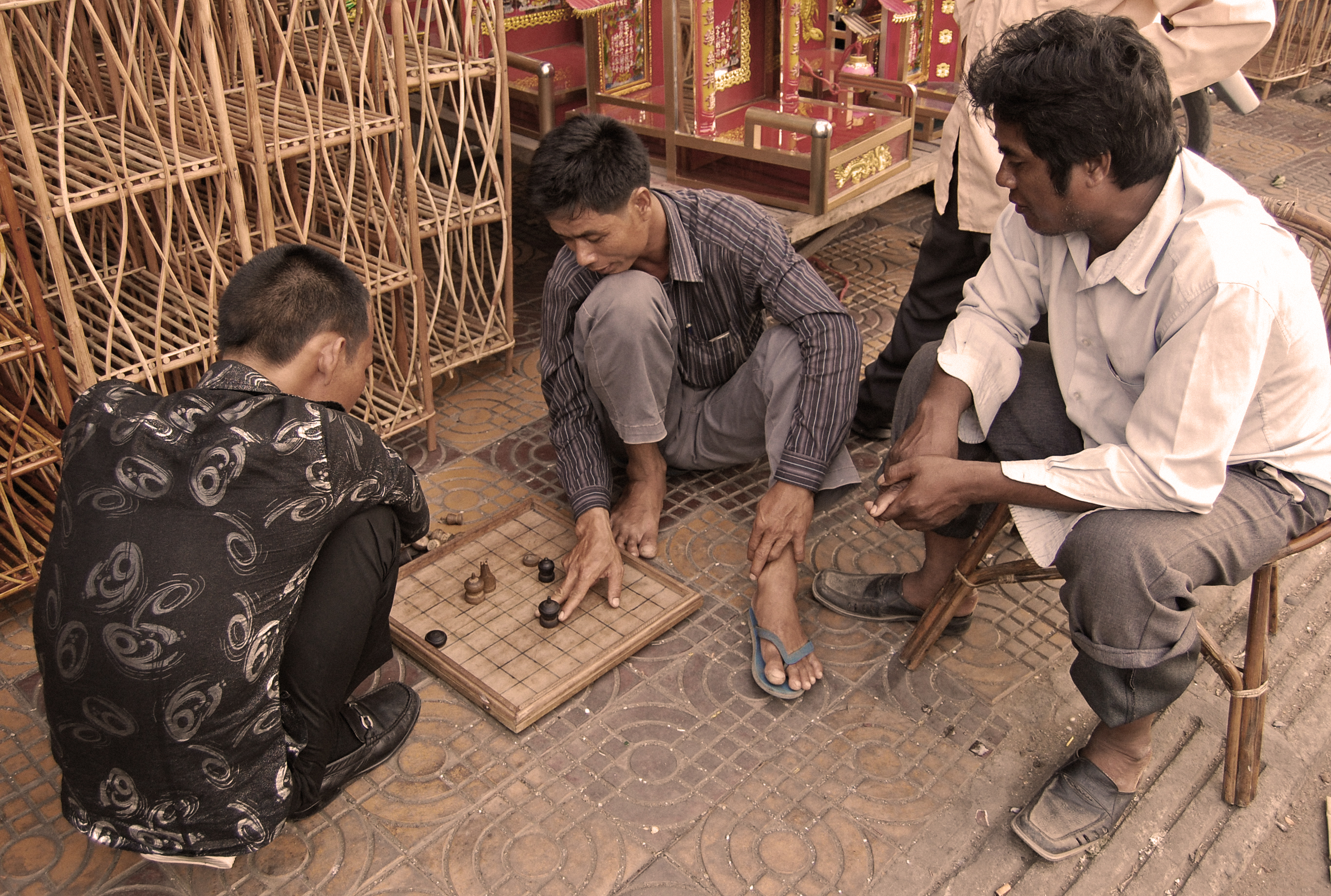
Cambodian men playing ouk

The Cambodian interpretation of makruk is called ouk (អុក [ʔok]) or ouk chaktrang (អុកចត្រង្គ [ʔok.caʔ.ˈtrɑŋ] or [ʔok.cat.ˈtrɑŋ]), with minor differences to its Thai counterpart. Played not just in Cambodia but also by Khmers in Vietnam, who call the game cờ ốc (lit. 'seashell chess') because of the pieces' shapes and the material once used to make them. It is a staple of the Bon Om Touk festivities.

The main rules difference involves the first movement of the lord and seed. If no pieces have been captured, the players have these options:

- On the lord's first move, and only if not in check, of moving the lord like a horse; and
- On the seed's first move, of moving the seed two spaces straight ahead.

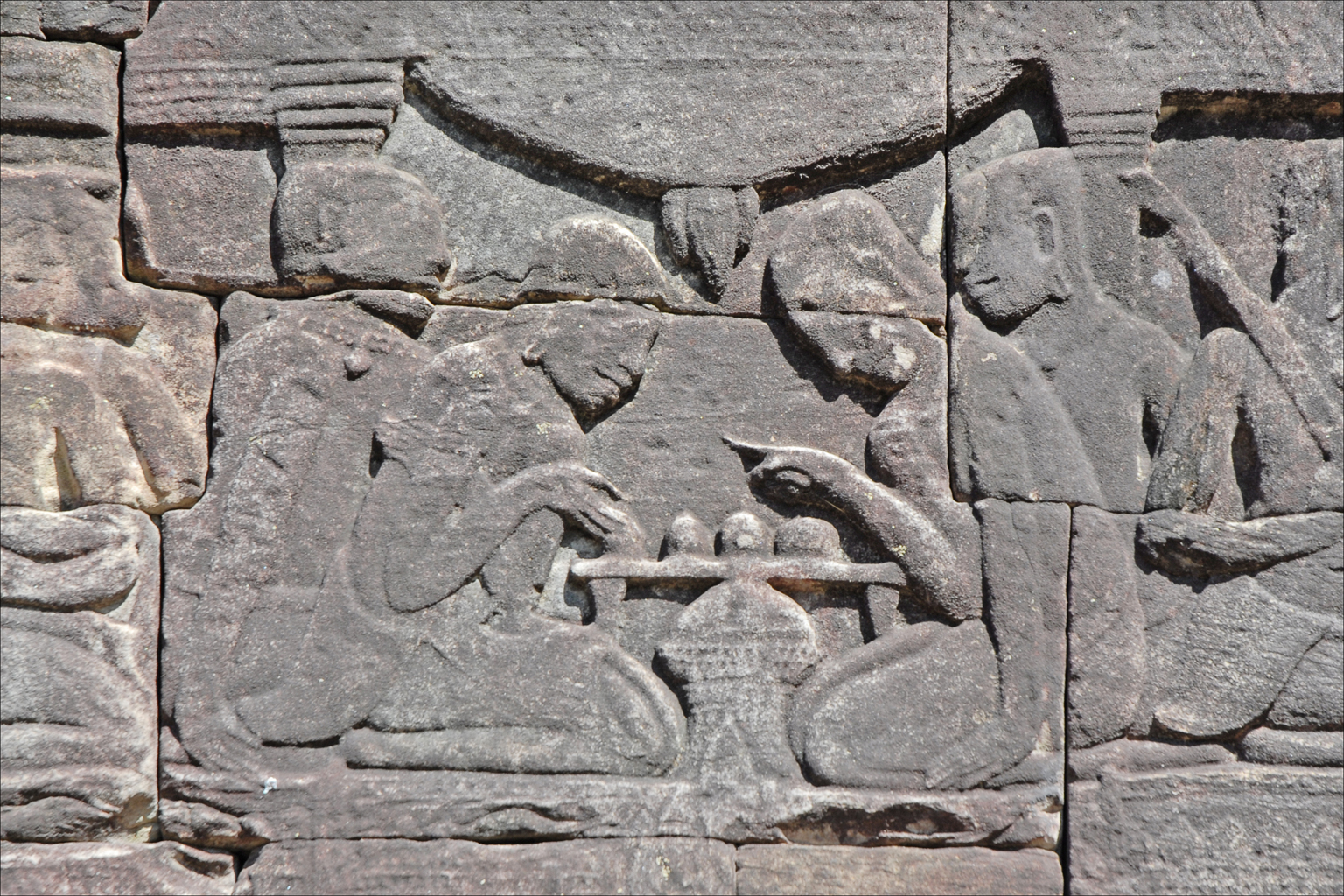
A bas-relief from the Khmer Empire depicting people playing a chess-like game

There is evidence that ouk has been played in Cambodia since the 12th century through bas-reliefs on temples.

The first nationwide ouk tournament was held on 3–4 April 2008, upon the completion of a standardized rule set by the Olympic Committee of Cambodia and the Cambodian Chess Association.

In a variant known as kar ouk, the first player to put the other in check wins. Another variant of Cambodian chess was described by David Pritchard in the first edition of The Encyclopedia of Chess Variants, but this was later determined to have been included in error as no such game was played in Cambodia.

Ouk is one of three traditional sports introduced by Cambodia at the 2023 SEA Games, along with the martial arts of Bokator and Kun Khmer.

== See also ==
- Shatar
- Sittuyin
