= Chess diagram =

Graphic depiction of a given position in a game of chess

A chess diagram is graphic representation of a position in a chess game, using standardised symbols. Chess diagrams are widely used in chess publications as an aid to visualisation, or to aid the readers to verify that they are looking at the correct position on their chessboard or computer. The symbols used generally resemble the pieces of the standard Staunton chess set, although a number of different fonts have been used over the centuries.

Position: a8 black rook, b8 black knight, c8 black bishop, d8 black queen, e8 black king, f8 black bishop, g8 black knight, h8 black rook, a7 black pawn, b7 black pawn, c7 black pawn, d7 black pawn, e7 black pawn, f7 black pawn, g7 black pawn, h7 black pawn, a2 white pawn, b2 white pawn, c2 white pawn, d2 white pawn, e2 white pawn, f2 white pawn, g2 white pawn, h2 white pawn, a1 white rook, b1 white knight, c1 white bishop, d1 white queen, e1 white king, f1 white bishop, g1 white knight, h1 white rook

This diagram shows the opening position in a game of chess.

Forsyth-Edwards Notation (FEN) can be used to represent a position without graphics, i.e. with letters and numbers only.

== Examples ==
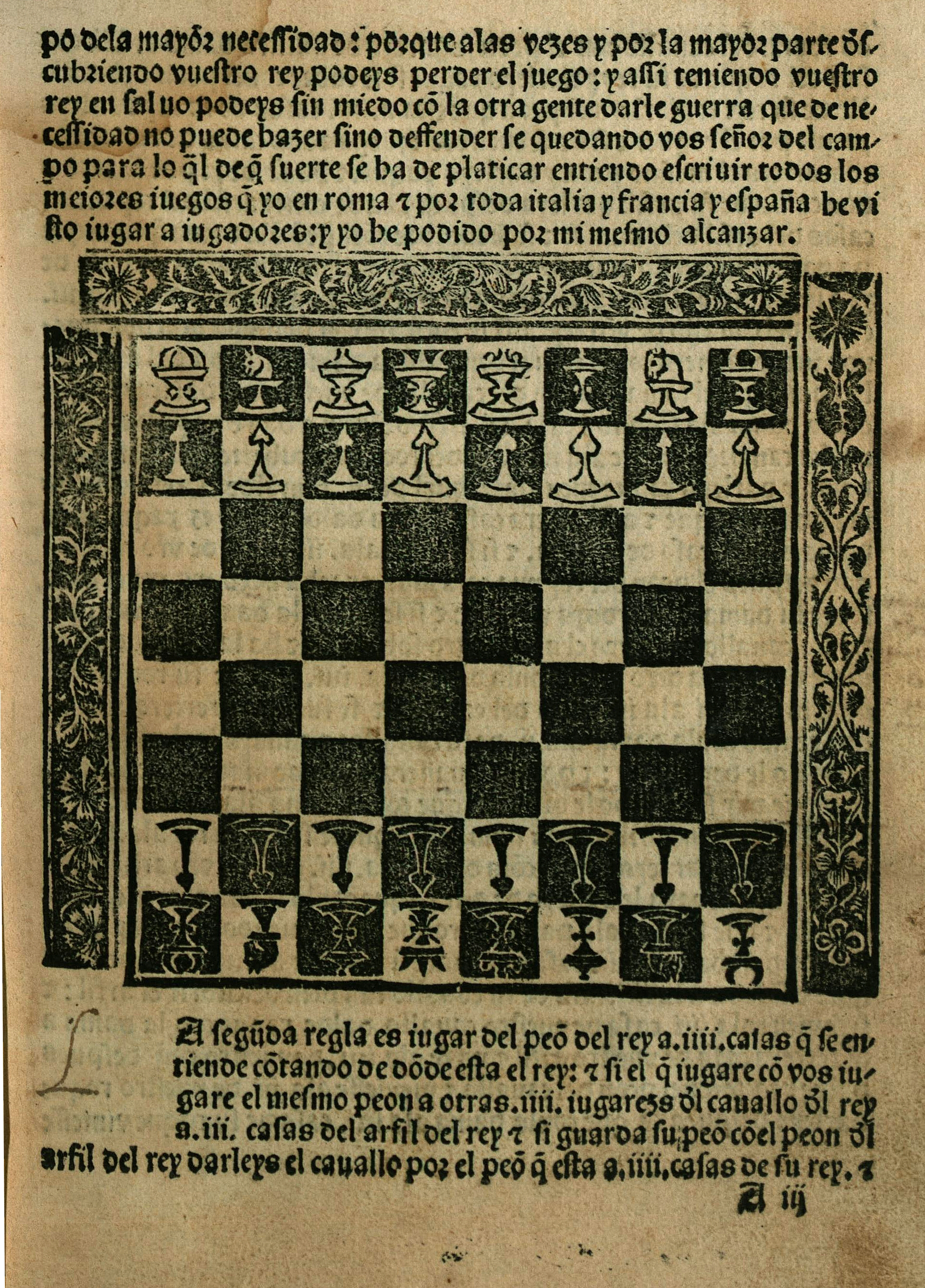
Lucena (1497)

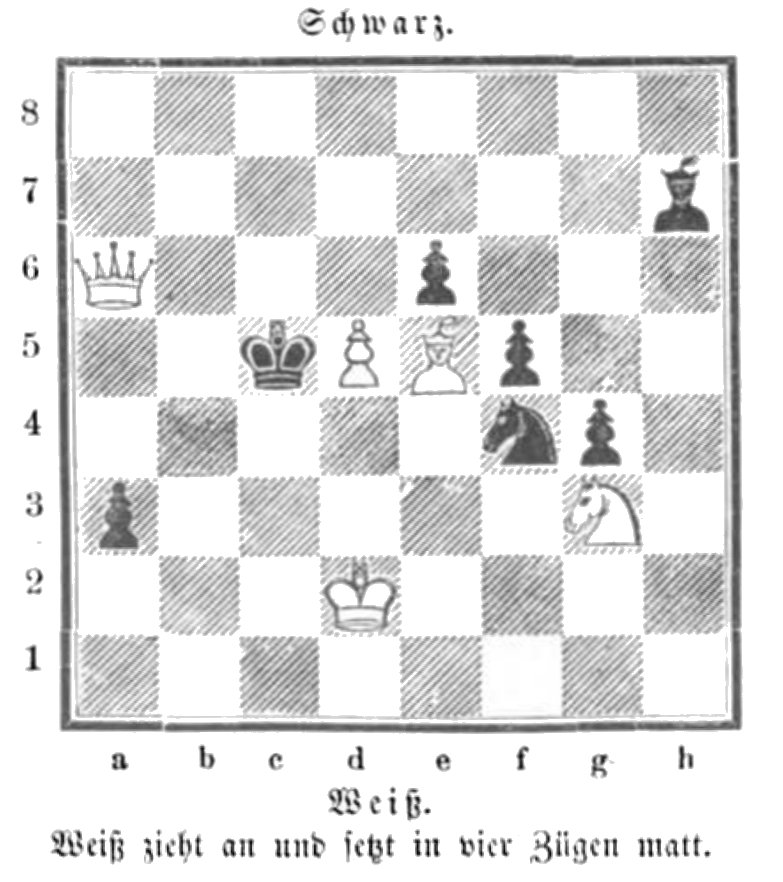
Die Gartenlaube (1860)

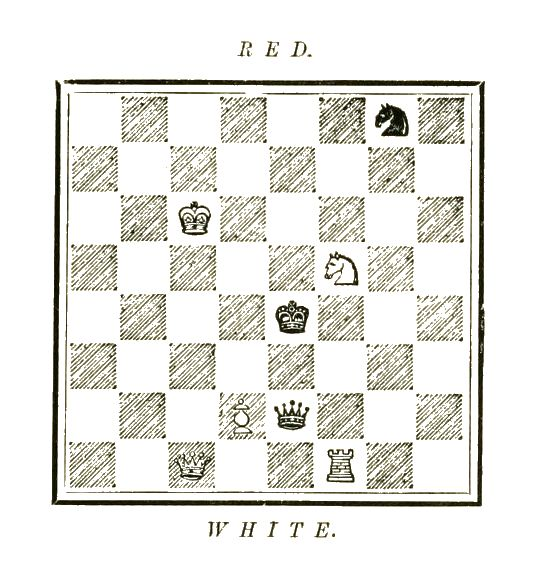
Through the Looking Glass by Lewis Carroll (1871)

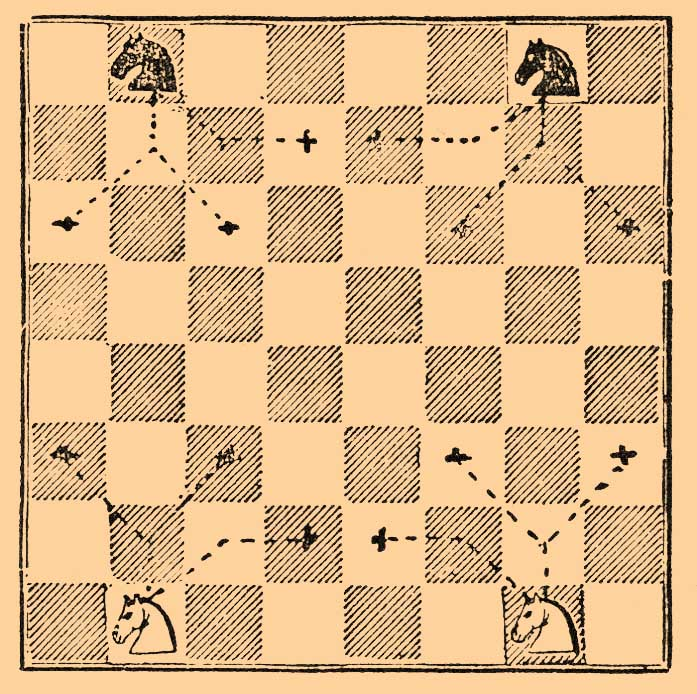
Brockhaus and Efron Encyclopedic Dictionary (1890-1907)

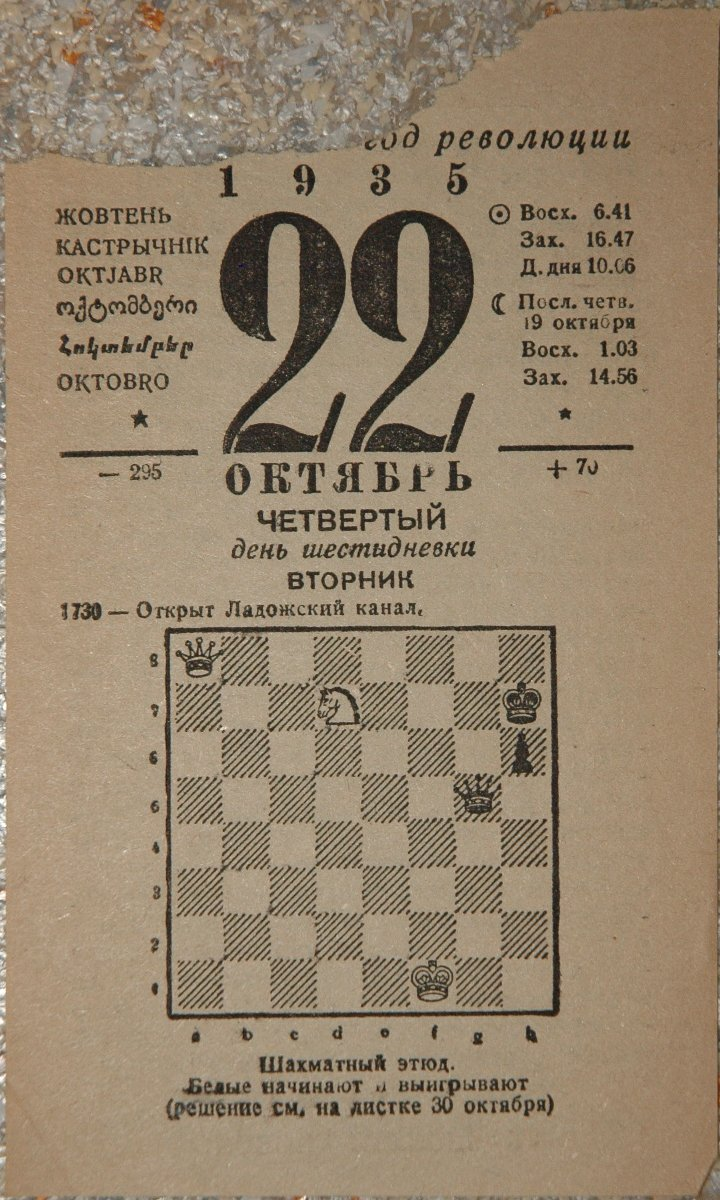
Page from a Soviet calendar (1935)

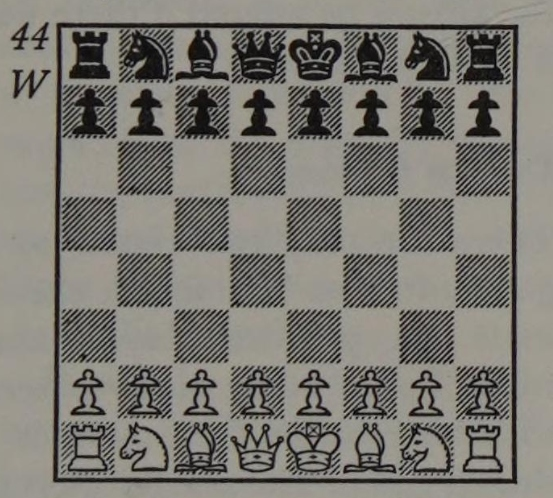
Font used by B.T. Batsford and other chess publishers in the 1970s
