= Catur sloki =

Sanskrit term for important verses from a scripture

Catur Śloka

Information
- Religion: Hinduism
- Author: Svayam Bhagavan (as per tradition)
- Language: Sanskrit
- Period: Ancient
- Verses: 4

Catur sloka is a Sanskrit term, referring to the four most important verses from a scripture, usually Bhagavad-gita or Bhagavata Purana spoken directly by Svayam bhagavan and considered by some Śruti.

== See also ==
- Sanskrit grammar
