= Alfil =

Fairy chess piece; jumps two squares diagonally

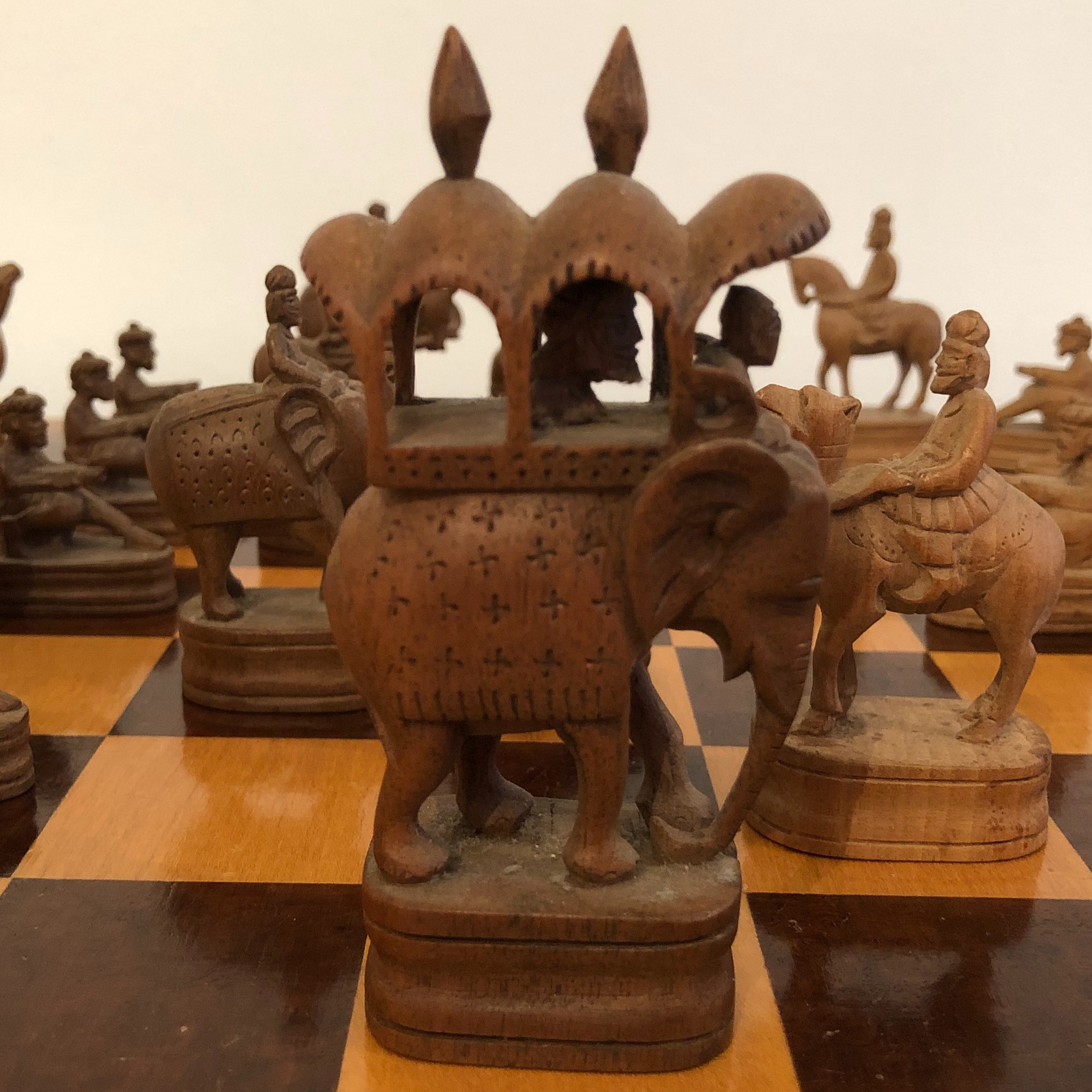
Antique Indian elephant chess piece representing the king

The pil, alfil, alpil, or elephant is a fairy chess piece that can jump two squares diagonally. It first appeared in shatranj. It is used in many historical and regional chess variants. It was used in standard chess before being replaced by the bishop in the 15th and 16th centuries. In modern Spanish, the bishop is still known as the alfil.

== Movement ==
Position: a7 black circle, e7 black pawn, c5 white upside-down bishop, d4 white pawn, a3 black circle, e3 black circle

The alfil, represented by an inverted bishop, may move to any marked square or capture the black pawn on e7.

The alfil jumps two squares diagonally, leaping over any intermediate piece. It captures enemy pieces in the same way. Some variants, such as xiangqi, use a version of the piece that cannot leap.

== History and nomenclature ==
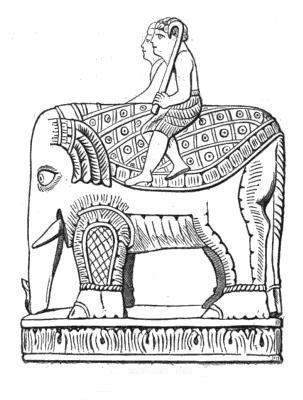
The elephant (alfil) as depicted in the so-called Charlemagne set (11th century, South Italy)

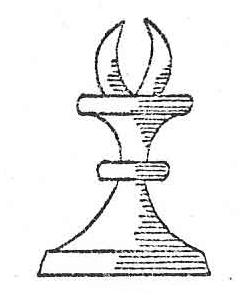
An illustration of a medieval bishop from Chessmen (1937) (from Jacobus Publicius, in his Ars oratoria, Ars epistolandi, Ars memorativa, published by Erhard Ratdolt in Venice in 1482)

The name of the game in adjoining countries appears to be derived from chaturanga - chatrang in Persian, shatranj in Arabic, Chanderaki in Tibetan are examples. This suggests that the game, as well as its name, came from India. Also, as will appear, it was believed in Persia that the game arrived there from India. The alfil is a very old piece, appearing in some very early chess variants, such as Tamerlane chess and shatranj. It was originally called an elephant, hastīn or gāja in Sanskrit. It was probably one of the original chess pieces, appearing in chaturanga and shatranj. However, its original move is uncertain; two possibilities, other than the current alfil move, are the dabbaba move (jumping two squares orthogonally) and the move of the silver general from shogi. The variant using the dabbaba move eventually died out, but the other variant spread to Burma and Siam, where it became the move for the equivalent pieces in the Burmese (sittuyin) and Thai (makruk) variants of chess. When chess spread to China, the piece became the elephant in xiangqi.

The silver general move was stated by Henry Davidson to resemble the four legs and trunk of an actual elephant. However, H. J. R. Murray in his History of Chess considered the two-square diagonal leap to be the original move, and reasoned that the main reason for the changes that made the alfil and ferz stronger in modern chess during the Renaissance (becoming the bishop and queen, respectively) were that these were originally the weakest pieces in the game apart from the pawns. The alfil can only reach one eighth of the squares on the board, whereas the dabbaba can reach one quarter, and the silver general can reach every square on the board.

When chess came to Persia from India, the Sanskrit name was translated to pil, and when chess came to the Muslims from Persia, the move had not changed, and then the name changed into Arabic to fil, the already existing cognate to pil which comes from the Akkadian language and ultimately from the Egyptian language. The name thus became fil and then alfil (prefixing the Arabic definite article, al). The names sometimes changed even more when chess eventually reached Europe, but eventually started to refer to the modern bishop rather than the alfil. Although alfil is still the name of the bishop in Spanish and some other European languages, its former name alfil began to be used in chess problems in English to refer exclusively to the original alfil.

== Value ==
The alfil can only reach one-eighth of the squares on the chessboard. Each of the eight alfils (represented by inverted bishops) can only move on squares of one color (either red, orange, yellow, green, cyan, blue, violet, or magenta).

The alfil by itself is not much more powerful than a pawn, but as an additional backup for other pieces, it is worth about half a knight. Its value is severely compromised by its being "thrice-colourbound", only being able to reach an eighth of the squares on the 8×8 chessboard; combining it with other pieces usually masks this weakness to some extent. A king and eight alfils, with each alfil covering a different eighth of the chessboard, can force checkmate on a bare king.

== Symbol ==
Both white and black symbols for the alfil were encoded in Unicode 17.0, in the Chess Symbols block:

🩕 U+1FA55 WHITE CHESS ALFIL
🩗 U+1FA57 BLACK CHESS ALFIL
