= Chaturaji =

Chess variant

	a	b	c	d	e	f	g	h
8	a8	b8	c8	d8	e8	f8	g8	h8	8
7	a7	b7	c7	d7	e7	f7	g7	h7	7
6	a6	b6	c6	d6	e6	f6	g6	h6	6
5	a5	b5	c5	d5	e5	f5	g5	h5	5
4	a4	b4	c4	d4	e4	f4	g4	h4	4
3	a3	b3	c3	d3	e3	f3	g3	h3	3
2	a2	b2	c2	d2	e2	f2	g2	h2	2
1	a1	b1	c1	d1	e1	f1	g1	h1	1
	a	b	c	d	e	f	g	h

Chaturaji starting position. Individual armies are distinguished by colour.

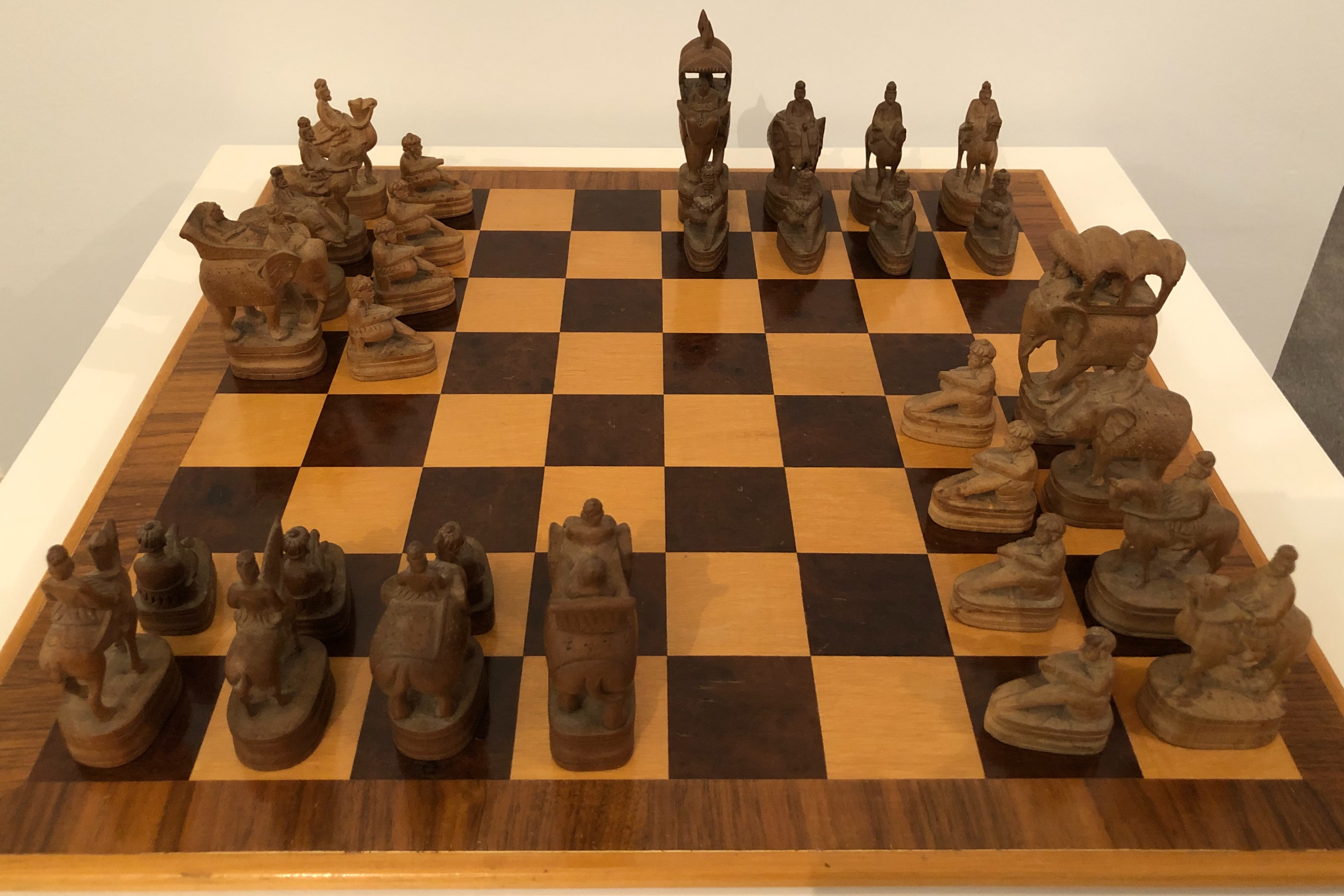
Antique Indian Chaturanga Chess set arranged for four players as in Chaturaji.

Chaturaji (meaning "four kings") is a four-player chess-like game. It was first described in detail c. 1030 by Al-Biruni in his book India. Originally, this was a game of chance: the pieces to be moved were decided by rolling two dice. A diceless variant of the game was still played in India at the close of the 19th century.

== History ==
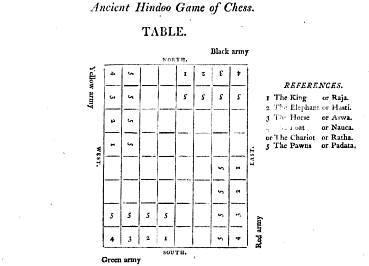
Hiram Cox's diagram of a chaturaji board.

The ancient Indian epic Mahabharata contains a reference to a game which could be chaturaji:

Presenting myself as a Brahmana, Kanka by name, skilled in dice and fond of play, I shall become a courtier of that high-souled king. And moving upon chess-boards beautiful pawns made of ivory, of blue and yellow and red and white hue, by throws of black and red dice, I shall entertain the king with his courtiers and friends.

There is no certainty, however, whether the mentioned game is really a chess-like game like chaturaji, or a race game like Pachisi. The mention of a gaming board is absent from the critical edition of the text, indicating it is a later addition.

I will become “Kanka,” a brahmin fond of gambling and reveling in dice, and I will be the high-hearted king’s games-playing courtier. I will set down cat’s-eye gem, gold and ivory game pieces on a gemstone gaming board, and cast beautiful black and red dice.

At the end of the 18th century, Hiram Cox put forth a theory (later known as the Cox–Forbes theory) that chaturaji is a predecessor of chaturanga and hence the ancestor of modern chess. The theory was developed by Duncan Forbes in the late 19th century, and was endorsed in an even stronger version by Stewart Culin. This theory was rejected by H. J. R. Murray in 1913, however, and modern scholars have sided with Murray. According to Forbes, this game is properly called chaturanga, which is also the name of a two-player game. The term chaturaji refers to a position in the game comparable to checkmate in chess. Forbes believed that the North and South players (Blue and Green) played as allies against the East and West players (Red and Yellow).

== Rules ==
=== Piece moves ===
Boat move

	a	b	c	d	e	f	g	h
8	a8	b8	c8	d8	e8	f8	g8	h8	8
7	a7	b7	c7	d7	e7	f7	g7	h7	7
6	a6	b6	c6	d6	e6	f6	g6	h6	6
5	a5	b5	c5	d5	e5	f5	g5	h5	5
4	a4	b4	c4	d4	e4	f4	g4	h4	4
3	a3	b3	c3	d3	e3	f3	g3	h3	3
2	a2	b2	c2	d2	e2	f2	g2	h2	2
1	a1	b1	c1	d1	e1	f1	g1	h1	1
	a	b	c	d	e	f	g	h

The boat on f6 can move to any of the four marked squares.

The game is played with pieces of four different colours as illustrated. Each player has four pieces on the back rank with four pawns in front of them on the second rank. The four pieces are king, elephant, horse and boat (also ship or rukh in some sources). The king moves like the chess king, the elephant like the chess rook and the horse like the chess knight. The boat corresponds to the chess bishop but has a more restricted range, like the alfil in shatranj. The boat moves two squares diagonally in any direction (see diagram), jumping over the intervening square. This differs from most ancient chess-like games where it is the elephant that normally corresponds to the chess bishop. Player turns pass clockwise around the board.

The pawn also moves as in chess, but does not have the option of an initial double-step move. Each of the four players' pawns moves and captures in a different direction along the board, as implied by the initial setup. For example, the red pawns which start on the g-file move left across the board, promoting on the a-file. Also, pawn promotion rules are different: one must promote to the piece that starts on the same file (or rank) of the promotion square (king included), and, the piece promoted to must have been previously captured.

=== Boat triumph ===
Boat triumph

	a	b	c	d	e	f	g	h
8	a8	b8	c8	d8	e8	f8	g8	h8	8
7	a7	b7	c7	d7	e7	f7	g7	h7	7
6	a6	b6	c6	d6	e6	f6	g6	h6	6
5	a5	b5	c5	d5	e5	f5	g5	h5	5
4	a4	b4	c4	d4	e4	f4	g4	h4	4
3	a3	b3	c3	d3	e3	f3	g3	h3	3
2	a2	b2	c2	d2	e2	f2	g2	h2	2
1	a1	b1	c1	d1	e1	f1	g1	h1	1
	a	b	c	d	e	f	g	h

The blue boat at f6 can capture all three enemy boats by moving to d4.

When a boat moves such that a 2×2 square filled with boats is formed, it captures all three boats of the other players (see diagram). This rule is called vrihannauka or boat triumph.

=== Sinhasana ===
Whoever moves a King to enter the original square of another King is said to have gained a sinhasana. If a player gains a sinhasana on the allied player's throne (player whose pieces are opposite), they take control of both armies.

=== Dice throws ===
On each turn two dice are thrown. Early descriptions of the game do not agree about whether (six-sided) cubical or (four-sided) stick dice were used. However, H. J. R. Murray believes cubical dice to only be a substitute for oblong dice. Players were allowed to throw the dice in the air and catch them, exercising some control over the outcome. Pieces to be moved are determined by the die values (note that the stick dice had no 1 or 6):

Die value	Piece
1	Pawn or king
2	Boat
3	Horse
4	Elephant
5	Pawn or king
6	Elephant

On each turn two moves can be made, one for each die. The same or two different pieces can be moved, and the player can skip one or both of their moves.

=== Scoring ===
There is no check or checkmate; the king can be captured like any other piece. The goal of the game is to collect as many points as possible. Points are scored by capturing opponents' pieces, according to this scale:

Piece	Points
Pawn	1
Boat	2
Horse	3
Elephant	4
King	5

A score of 54 points is awarded to a player who manages to capture all three opponents' kings while their own king remains on the board. This value is a sum of points of all pieces in three armies.

== See also ==
- Dice chess
