= Sittuyin =

Game native to Myanmar

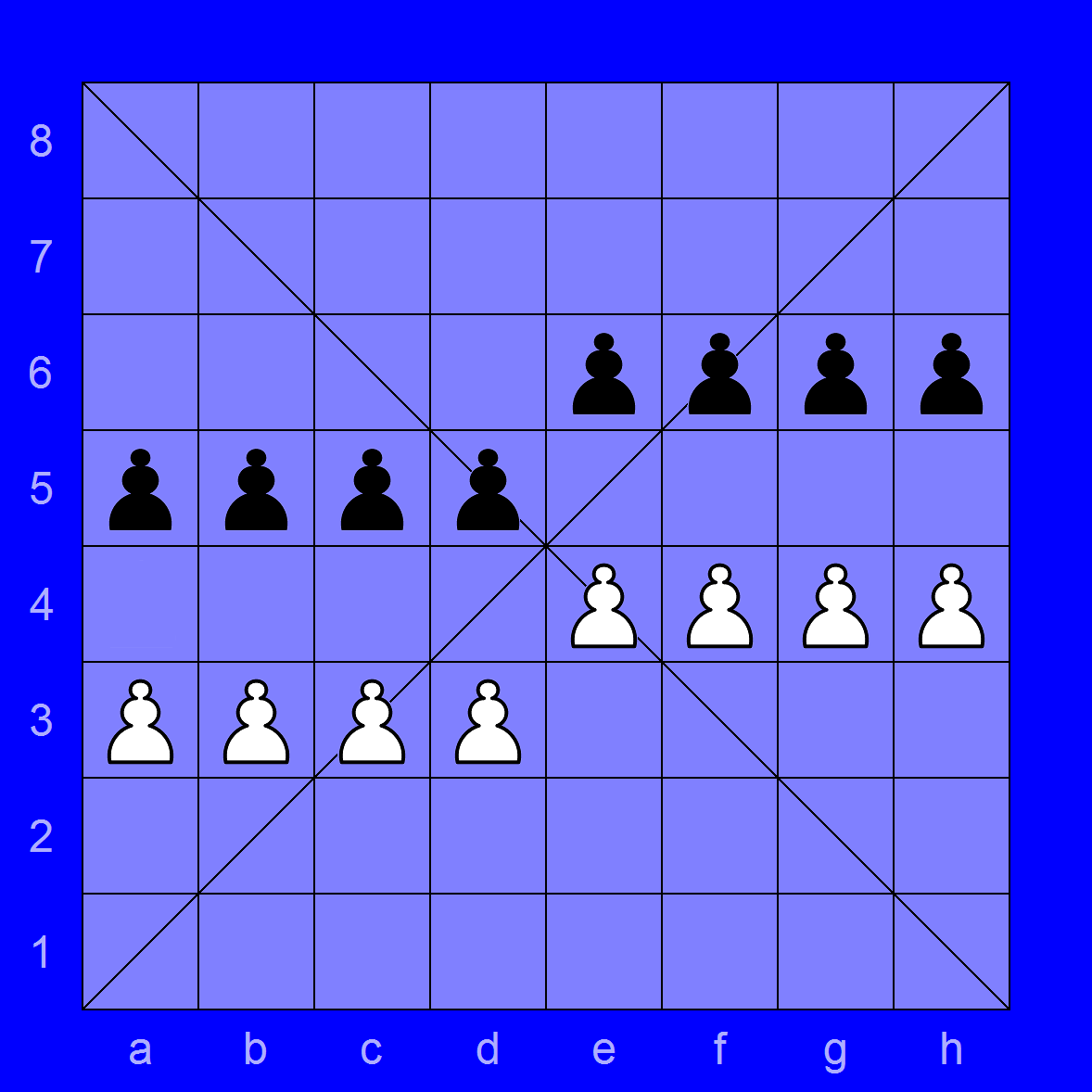
- Sittuyin board and starting position
- Years active: 8th century to present
- Genres: Board game; Abstract strategy game
- Players: 2
- Setup time: < 1 minute
- Playing time: From 20 minutes to several hours
- Chance: None
- Skills: Strategy, tactics
- Synonyms: Burmese chess

Sittuyin (Burmese: စစ်တုရင်), also known as Burmese chess, is a strategy board game created in Myanmar. It is a direct offspring of the Indian game of chaturanga, which arrived in Myanmar in the 8th century thus it is part of the same family of games such as chess and shogi. Sit is the modern Burmese word for "army" or "war"; the word sittuyin can be translated as "representation of the four characteristics of army"—chariot, elephant, cavalry and infantry.

In its native land, the game has been largely overshadowed by Western (international) chess, although it remains popular in the northwestern regions.

== Board ==
The sittuyin board consists of 64 squares, 8 rows and 8 columns, without alternating colors. The board also has two diagonal lines from corner to corner, which are known as sit-ke-myin (Burmese: စစ်ကဲမျဉ်း, general's lines).

== Pieces and their moves ==
Pieces are commonly made of wood, and sometimes of ivory. The height of the pieces varies by class. The official colors of the pieces are red and black.

Min-gyi (Burmese: မင်းကြီး, "king", analogous to the king in Western chess)

1 piece per player. It can move one step in any direction.

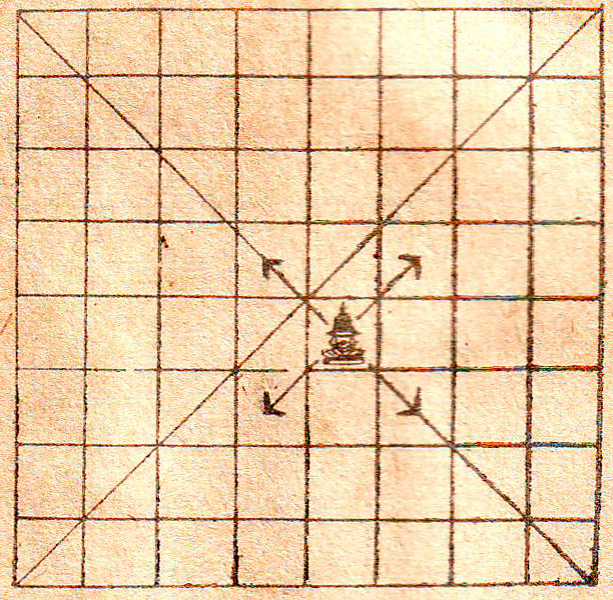
General's movement

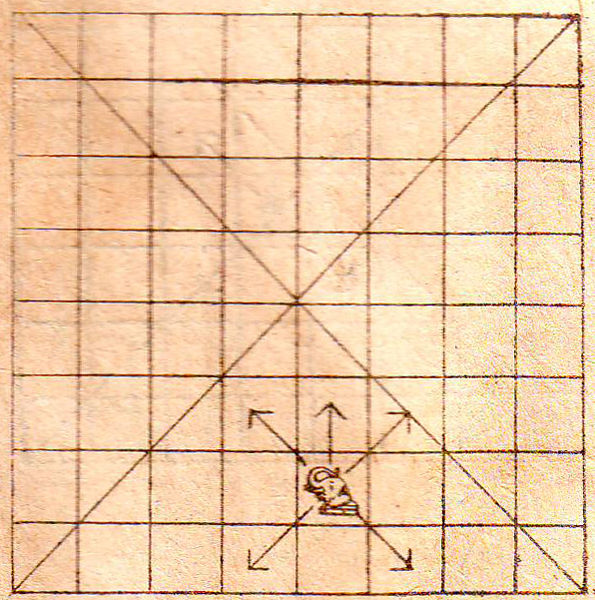
Elephant's movement

Sit-ke (Burmese: စစ်ကဲ, "general", analogous to the queen in Western chess)

1 piece per player. It can move one step in any diagonal direction (as fers in shatranj).

Sin (Burmese: ဆင်, "elephant", analogous to the bishop in Western chess)

2 pieces per player. It can move one step in any diagonal direction or one step forward (as silver general in shogi).

Myin (Burmese: မြင်း, "horse", analogous to the knight in Western chess)

2 pieces per player. It can jump two horizontal squares and one vertical square, or two vertical squares and one horizontal square, as knight in Western chess.

Yahhta (Burmese: ရထား, "chariot", analogous to the rook in Western chess)

2 pieces per player. It can move any number of free squares along four orthogonal directions.

Nè (Burmese: နယ်, "feudal lord", analogous to the pawn in Western chess)

8 pieces per player. It can move one step forward but cannot retreat. It captures one diagonal step forward.

== Rules ==
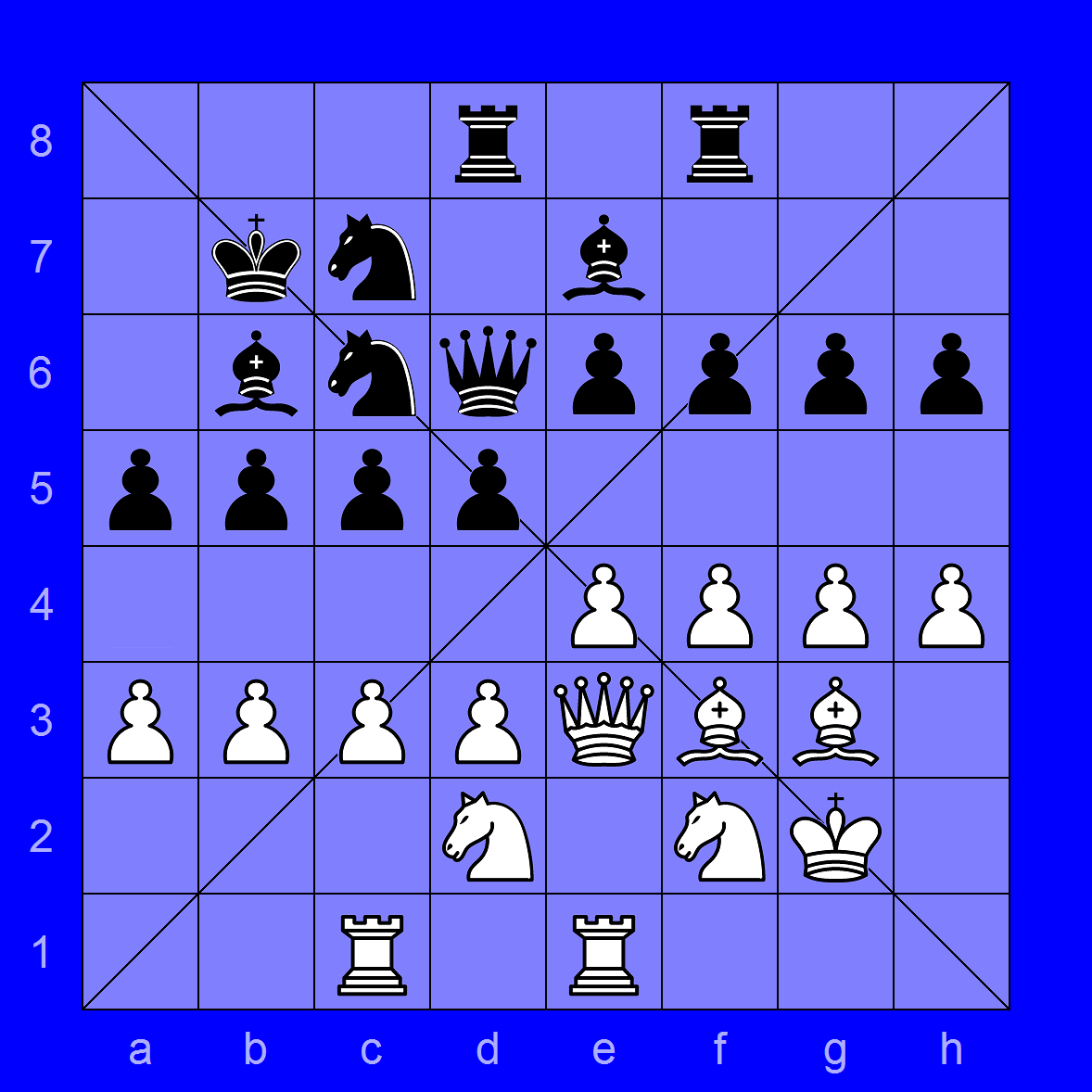
A position after setup phase is complete

Only feudal lords (pawns) are on the board in the initial position. The game starts with the Red player (depicted here having white pieces), followed by the Black player, placing their other pieces arbitrarily on their own halves of the board (known as sit-tee or troops deployment): chariots can be put on any square on the back rank. In official tournaments, a small curtain is used on the middle of the board to prevent the players seeing each other's deployment during the sit-tee phase. One of the possible game openings is shown in the diagram.

Feudal lords promote to general when they reach diagonal lines marked on the board. The promotion is possible only if that player's general has been captured. If the player has a feudal lord on a promotion square and their general is no longer on the board, the player can (if they wish to) promote the feudal lord to general instead of making a move. A feudal lord which passes the promotion square cannot promote anymore.

The goal of the game is to khwè (checkmate) the opponent's king. Putting the opponent in stalemate is not allowed.

In the version reported in A History of Chess in 1913, a game of sittuyin had three stages:

1. Eight moves each: the sit-tee stage described above, but no restriction on chariot placing; Murray did not mention a curtain. Also, a player could put a piece where one of their pawns was, and in the same move put that pawn in a free square behind their row of pawns.
2. Second stage: in each move, each player moves any one of their pieces (not a pawn) to any other empty place in their own half of the board, ignoring the usual move rules. Or they can move a pawn one square forwards and this ends the second stage and the third stage starts.
3. Ordinary play, obeying the rules for piece moves.
Most common starting positions
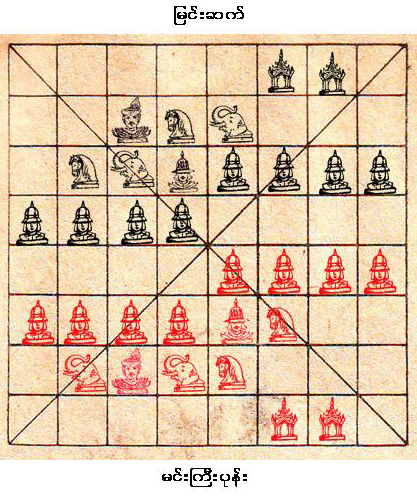

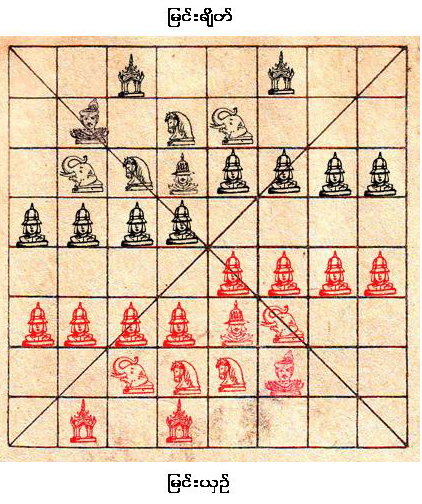

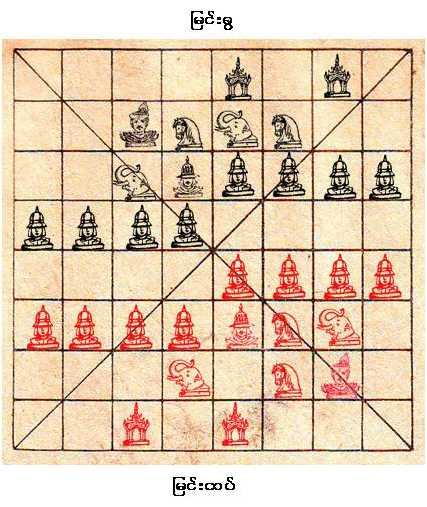

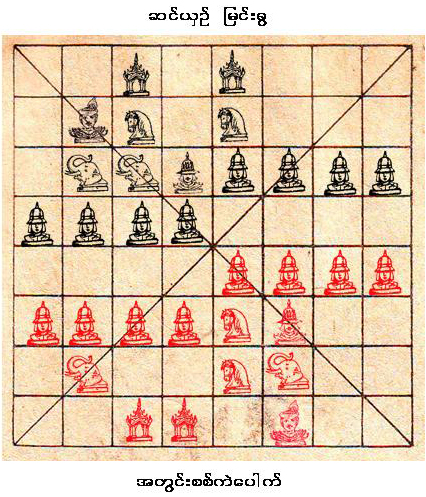

== Dice rules ==
Anne Sunnucks writes that in some variations, three dice were thrown and each player made three moves at a time.

== See also ==
- Short assize – a type of medieval European chess
