= Ludus latrunculorum =

Roman board game

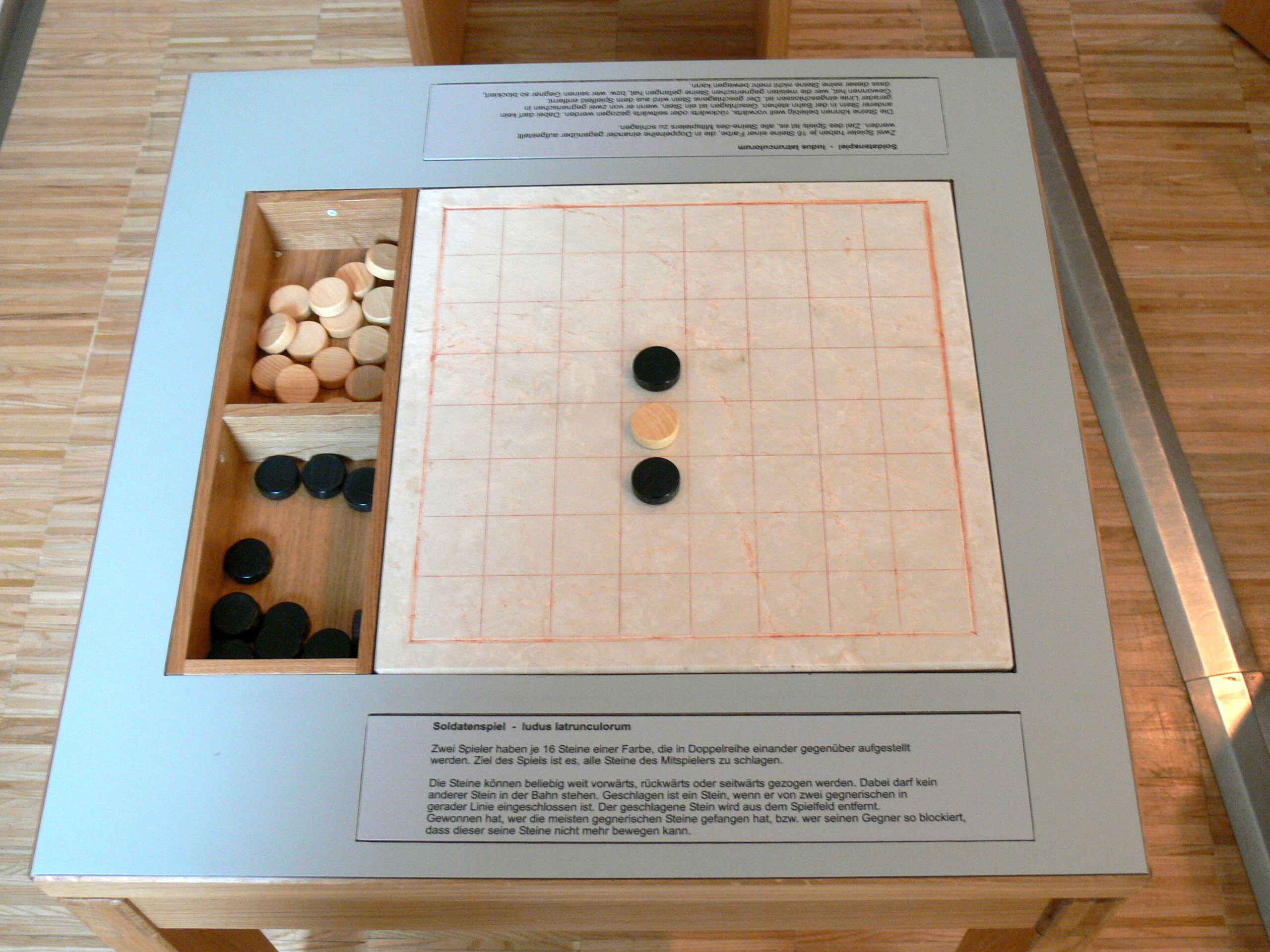
- Modern reconstruction. Museum Quintana of Archaeology, in Künzing, Germany
- Genres: Board game Abstract strategy game
- Players: 2
- Setup time: 1 minute
- Playing time: Unknown
- Chance: None
- Skills: Strategy, tactics
- Synonyms: Latrunculi; Latrones

Ludus latrunculorum, latrunculi, or simply latrones ("the game of brigands", or "the game of soldiers" from latrunculus, diminutive of latro, mercenary or highwayman) is a two-player strategy board game played throughout the Roman Empire. It is said to resemble chess or draughts, as it is generally accepted to be a game of military tactics. Because of the scarcity of sources, reconstruction of the game's rules and basic structure is difficult, and therefore there are multiple interpretations of the available evidence.

== History ==
=== Sources ===
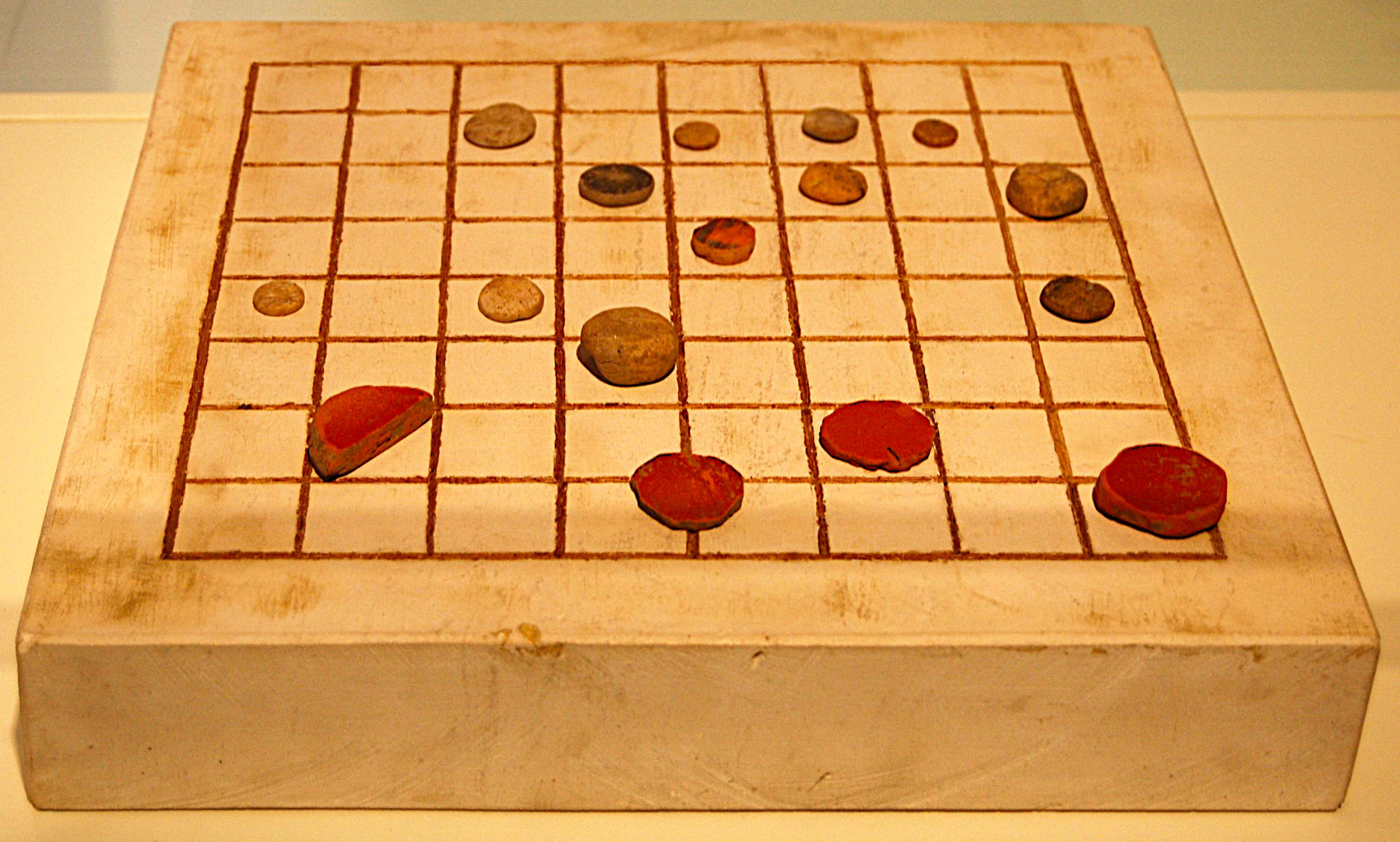
Ludus latrunculorum in Complutum (Spain).

The game of latrunculi is believed to be a variant of earlier Greek games known variously as petteia, pessoí, psêphoi, poleis and pente grammaí, to which references are found as early as Homer's time. In Plato's Republic, Socrates' opponents are compared to "bad Petteia players, who are finally cornered and made unable to move." In the Phaedrus, Plato writes that these games come from Egypt. Latrunculi is often compared to a draughts-like game with custodial capture, called seega, known in Egypt from the late 18th century.

In his Onomasticon, the Greek writer Julius Pollux describes poleis as follows:

The game played with many pieces is a board with spaces disposed among lines: the board is called the "city" and each piece is called a "dog"; the pieces are of two colors, and the art of the game consists in taking a piece of one color by enclosing it between two of the other color.

Among the Romans, the first mention of latrunculi is found in the Roman author Varro (116–27 BC), in the tenth book of his De Lingua Latina ("On the Latin Language"), where he mentions the game in passing, comparing the grid on which it is played to the grid used for presenting declensions. An account of a game of latrunculi is given in the 1st-century AD Laus Pisonis:

When you are weary with the weight of your studies, if perhaps you are pleased not to be inactive but to start games of skill, in a more clever way you vary the moves of your counters on the open board, and wars are fought out by a soldiery of glass, so that at one time a white counter traps blacks, and at another a black traps whites. Yet what counter has not fled from you? What counter gave way when you were its leader? What counter [of yours] though doomed to die has not destroyed its foe? Your battle line joins combat in a thousand ways: that counter, flying from a pursuer, itself makes a capture; another, which stood at a vantage point, comes from a position far retired; this one dares to trust itself to the struggle, and deceives an enemy advancing on its prey; that one risks dangerous traps, and, apparently entrapped itself, counter traps two opponents; this one is advanced to greater things, so that when the formation is broken, it may quickly burst into the columns, and so that, when the rampart is overthrown, it may devastate the closed walls. Meanwhile, however keenly the battle rages with cut-up soldiers, you conquer with a formation, that is full, or bereft of only a few soldiers, and each of your hands rattles with its band of captives.

Allusions to the game are found in the works of such writers as Martial and Ovid and they provide evidence as to the method of capture used in the game with passages such as: unus cum gemino calculus hoste perit, Ov. Ars amatoria 3.358 ("when one counter perishes by a twin foe"); cum medius gemino calculus hoste perit, Ov. Tristia 2.478 ("when a counter perishes in the midst by a twin foe"); and calculus hae (sc. tabula) gemino discolor hoste perit, Mart. 14.17.2 ("a counter of differing colour perishes on this [board] with a twin enemy").

Ovid also writes about the efforts to rescue an isolated piece away from the others: "how the different colored soldier marches forth in a straight line; when a piece caught between two adversaries is imperiled, how one advancing may be skilful to attack and rescue a piece moved forward, and retreating may move safely, not uncovered" (Tristia II 477–480). According to Ulrich Schädler, this indicates that the pieces in the game only moved one space per turn, instead of using the Rook's move, otherwise an isolated piece's escape would have been relatively easy. Schädler also deduces from this that pieces were able to jump over other pieces into an empty square beyond, otherwise a rescuing piece could end up blocking the other piece needing rescue.

The last mention of latrunculi that survives from the Roman period is in the Saturnalia of Macrobius.

For a long time, it was thought that the eighteenth book of Isidore of Seville's Etymologiae contains a reference to latrunculi, and this was used to argue that the pieces on either side were of different powers and classes like the pieces in chess. R. G. Austin has argued, however, that the passage from Isidore on which this belief was based refers to an early form of Tabula.

De Calculorum Motu. Calculi partim ordine moventur, partim vage: ideo alios ordinarios, alios vagos appellant; at vero qui moveri omnino non possunt, incitos dicunt. Unde et egentes homines inciti vocantur, quibus spes ultra procedendi nulla restat.
On the Movement of Stones. Some stones move in rows, some freely; thus, some are called ordinary, others free; and truly those that cannot be moved at all are said to be inciti. From which even acting men for whom no hope of proceeding further remains are called inciti.

The Stanway game, excavated near Colchester, has been identified by scholars such as David Parlett as possibly being an example of latrunculi. If this is true then it is possible there was a second piece other than the soldiers used in the game, and this has been interpreted by some reconstructions as a piece representing a "Dux" (leader) or "Aquila" (eagle). However, Ulrich Schädler suggests the game may instead be an example of a native Celtic game, such as fidchell or gwyddbwyll, since there is no evidence for an extra piece other than the latrones or pessoi in any of the ancient Greek and Roman games.

=== Chess ===
Latrunculi as well as latrones is mentioned many times in Ruy López de Segura's classic 1561 work Libro de la invencion liberal y arte del juego del axedrez, also referring to mentions in Jacobus de Cessolis's sermons on the theme of chess in the later thirteenth century.

Latrunculi is mentioned on the first page of Philidor's 1777 edition of the classic work "Analysis of the Game of Chess."

Myron J. Samsin and Yuri Averbakh have both supported the theory that Petteia may have influenced the historical development of early chess, particularly the movement of the pawns. Petteia games could have certainly been brought to central Asia and northern India during the rule of the Greco-Bactrian Kingdom and Indo-Greek Kingdom which were known to combine Indian and Greek elements in their art, coinage, and religious practices.

When chess came to Germany, the chess terms for "chess" and "check" (which had originated in Persian) entered the German language as Schach. But Schach was already a native German word for robbery. As a result, ludus latrunculorum was often used as a medieval Latin name for chess.

=== Board geometry ===
Since, in archaeological excavations, it is usually hard to tell what game a gridded board was used for, it is hard to determine the size of the board on which latrunculi was played. R. C. Bell, writing in 1960, mentioned boards of 7×8, 8×8, and 9×10 squares as common in Roman Britain. W. J. Kowalski refers to the "Stanway Game", an archeological find of 1996 in Stanway, Essex, England, and believes the game was played on a board of 8×12 squares; the same size that was used a thousand years later for courier chess. He later allowed a board of 10×11 squares. A 7×9 example was found at Vindolanda in 2019, one of sixteen latrunculi boards of various sizes found at the site.

The rules may have varied much across the width of the Roman Empire and through time.

== Game rule reconstructions ==
=== Edward Falkener's reconstruction (1892) ===
1. Game played on a [12×12 ?] board having 144 cells or squares.
2. Each player has five rows of pieces, beginning at the left hand corner they are placed alternately.
3. The pieces move and take in all directions, perpendicularly, horizontally, diagonally, forwards and backwards.
4. Pieces attack each other when in contiguous cells, and when another piece comes up on the opposite side the intermediate piece is taken off.
5. A piece can go between two adverse pieces without being taken.
6. When one side is hopelessly beaten or locks himself in, the game is lost.

=== R.C. Bell's reconstruction (1960–1969) ===
1. Using an 8×7 (or presumably 8×8) board each player has 17 pieces, one blue, the others either white or black. The white and black pieces are placed two at a time by alternate turns of play anywhere on this board. During this first phase no captures are made.
2. When the 32 pieces are in position each player adds his blue piece, the Dux.
3. The pieces move forwards or backwards or sideways one square at a time. There is no diagonal movement.
4. A piece is captured when the opponent brackets it orthogonally between two of the opponent's pieces, or between an opponent piece and a corner (but not side) square. The Dux is captured like any other piece. A piece that makes a capture gains an immediate second move.
5. The Dux can move like the rest of the pieces, or can jump over an enemy piece that is in an adjacent square. The jumped piece is not captured by the move. Of course, the move can have as consequence the capture of another piece.
6. If a piece is moved voluntarily between two enemy pieces, it is not captured.
7. A player who loses all his pieces loses the game. If no captures are made in thirty moves, the game is ended, and the player with more pieces on the board wins.

=== W. J. Kowalski's reconstruction (Based on the Stanway Game) ===
1. The board has eight ranks (rows) and twelve files (columns). Each player has twelve men and a dux, black on one side and white on the other. In the starting array the men fill the first rank and the dux stands on the second, on the square just to the right of the center line (from each player's point of view). On the board of ten squares by eleven, the dux starts in the center of the back row, flanked by five men on each side. Black moves first.
2. Each piece may move any unobstructed distance along a rank or file (like the rook in chess).
3. A man is captured if the enemy places a piece adjacent to it on each side in an orthogonal line. Multiple men in a line can be captured together (Kowalski later abandoned this feature).
4. If a piece is moved voluntarily between two enemy pieces, it is not captured, but the player so moving should point out the fact, to avoid later disputes.
5. A man in a corner is captured if the opponent places his men on the two squares adjacent to the corner.
6. Repeating sequences of moves are not allowed: if the same position occurs three times, with the same player to move, he must vary his attack.
7. The dux cannot be captured. It is immobilized if blocked on all four sides. A player who immobilizes the enemy's dux wins the game, even if some of the obstruction is by the dux's own men. If the game cannot be won by immobilizing either dux, the player who has more men left on the board wins. (Kowalski later changed this to say that play continues until one player cannot move, and so loses.)

=== Ulrich Schädler's reconstruction (2001) ===
Use a normal checkerboard with 8×8 squares. The two players agree about the number of pieces, at least 16, but not more than 24 for each player. If the board is larger, then the number of pieces increases too. Use pieces such as coins or hemispheres with different sides that can be flipped.

1. The players take turns to place one piece on any vacant square. According to Bishop Isidore of Sevilla (Origines, chapter 64; 7th century) these pieces were called vagi. In this phase no captures are made.
2. When all the pieces have been placed, the players take turns to move pieces on the board. The pieces can be moved orthogonally to any adjacent square. Isidore called these pieces ordinarii. A piece can leap over any single piece of either color, if the square behind is unoccupied. Several leaps in one turn are possible (as in draughts).
3. If a player can trap an enemy piece between two friendly pieces, the enemy piece is blocked and cannot be moved. Such a piece is called alligatus or, according to Isidore, incitus. To make it clear that a piece is an alligatus, it is turned upside down.
4. In his next turn, instead of moving a piece, the player can capture the trapped piece by removing it from the board, provided his own two surrounding pieces are still free. The trapped piece is immediately free if one of its two enemies is itself surrounded.
5. A player can move a piece between two enemies ("suicide") only if by this move one of the two is trapped.
6. A player reduced to only one piece left on the board has lost the game.

Latrunculi in two different reconstructions by Schädler based on the literary evidence may be played online at the Locus Ludi website.

=== Museum Quintana reconstruction ===
These are the rules from the Museum Quintana in Künzing (pictured above):

1. Two players have sixteen pieces each, which are arranged in two rows facing each other. The goal of the game is to capture all of the opponent's pieces.
2. The pieces move orthogonally any unobstructed distance. A piece is captured when it is caught between two opposing pieces on adjacent squares in a rank or file. The captured piece is removed from the board. Victory is by capturing more pieces than one's opponent, or by hemming in the opponent's pieces so that movement is impossible.

== Similar games ==
In China the various board games in the family of Fang Qi have similar rules. Typically board size varies from 4×4 in Korea (Gonu) to 17×17 in Tibet. Most varieties have the initial "Placing Stone" phase, followed by the "Removing Stone" phase (if any), and then finally the "Capturing Stone" phase.
