= Fidchell: Celtic Chess =

1990 board game

Fidchell: Celtic Chess is a board game published in 1990 by Quintessential Games.

== Contents ==
Fidchell: Celtic Chess is a game in which a modern version of the ancient lost game fidchell is presented.

== Reception ==
David Pritchard reviewed Fidchell: Celtic Chess for Games International magazine, and gave it a rating of 6 out of 10, and stated that "an interesting game on which it would be easy to get hooked given strong opposition, but at a price that I feel is excessive even for these days."
