= Véronique Dasen =

Swiss classical scholar

- Born: 1957 (age 68–69)
- Occupations: Classicist, Archaeologist

Academic background
- Education: University of Oxford
- Thesis: Dwarfs in ancient Egypt and Greece (1989)

Academic work
- Institutions: University of Fribourg; École pratique des hautes études Pantheon-Sorbonne University
- Main interests: Ancient medicine, Ancient magic, Amulets

Véronique Dasen (born 1957) is a Swiss archaeologist and Professor in Classical Archaeology and Art History at the University of Fribourg. Her research is led in a multidisciplinary and anthropological perspective. Her research interests range from ancient iconography and material culture, the history of the body, of medicine and magical practices to gender studies, history of childhood, and ludic culture (games and divination, games and love, passage rites).

== Career ==
Dasen received her PhD in 1989 from the University of Oxford with a thesis titled "Dwarfs in Ancient Egypt and Greece", which she published as a monograph in 1993.

Since 2008, she has worked as the Professor in Classical Archaeology and Art History at the University of Fribourg. She was the fifth woman to receive her habilitation from the Faculty of Humanities at the University of Fribourg in 2000. In 2016, she gave a series of lectures at the École pratique des hautes études on 'Magic, divination, and the history of the body'. In 2017, she was a visiting lecturer at the Pantheon-Sorbonne University. Also in 2017 she was involved in the successful funding application to the European Research Council for a €2.4million grant for a five-year project titled 'Locus Ludi: The Cultural Fabric of Play and Games in Classical Antiquity'.

Dasen is the chair of the panel 'SHS-4 Social sciences and humanities' for the Fonds de la Recherche Scientifique.

== Publications ==
- 2018. "Amulets, the Body and Personal Agency", in Parker, A. and McKie, S. (eds) Material Approaches to Roman Magic: Occult Objects and Supernatural Substances (TRAC Themes in Roman Archaeology 2). Oxford, Oxbow.
- 2015. "Probaskania: Amulets and Magic in Antiquity", in Boschung, D. and Bremmer, J. The Materiality of Magic (Mophomata 20). Paderborn, Wilhelm Fink.
- 2015. Le sourire d'Omphale. Maternité et petite enfance dans l'Antiquité. Rennes.
- 2014. With Spieser, J-M., Les savoirs magiques et leur transmission de l’Antiquité à la Renaissance. Florence
- 2010. With Späth, T. Children, Memory, and Family Identity in Roman Culture. Oxford 2010.
- 2008. With King, H. La médecine dans l’Antiquité grecque et romaine. Lausanne
- 2005. Jumeaux, jumelles dans l’Antiquité grecque et romaine. Kilchberg.
- 1993. Dwarfs in Ancient Egypt and Greece (Oxford Monographs on Classical Archaeology). Oxford, Clarendon Press.
