= Druid of Colchester =

Iron Age archeological site in Essex, England

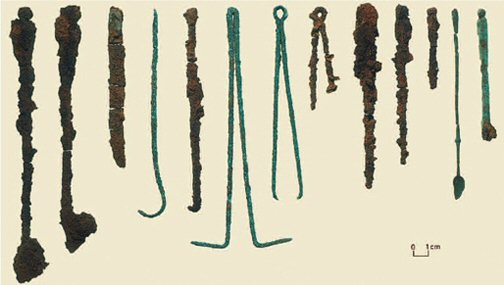
Surgical Tools

The “Druid of Colchester” is the name of an archaeological site discovered in Stanway, near Colchester. It is the grave of a person buried with surgical tools and a small board-game. The person whose cremated remains were buried in the grave could have been either a man or a woman, and is also called the Druid of Colchester (or the surgeon of Colchester).

== Discovery ==
The grave was discovered by archaeologists in 1996, at the village of Stanway, Essex, The find is believed to be that of an Iron Age druid dated c. 40–60 AD. It is one among a number of graves of eminent people found, believed to be buried around the time of the Roman invasion of Britain in 43 AD. The area was then associated with the Catuvellauni tribe.

== Artifacts ==
In the wooden chambered burial site, archaeologists uncovered cremated human remains, and a board game – the first time that such a game has been found virtually intact. Other items uncovered included a cloak decorated with brooches, a jet bead believed to have magical properties, medical equipment, a tea strainer still containing some kind of herbal brew, and some mysterious metal poles conjectured to be used for divining.

The surgical kit consisted of 13 instruments including:

- scalpels
- sharp and blunt retractors
- needles
- probe
- surgical saw
- hooks
- forceps

A cup was also found, containing traces of the herb mugwort. The tea strainer also contained herbs commonly associated with herbal remedies in ancient times.

Philip Crummy, director of the trust, remained cautious, adding that there may be other explanations. "In the report we draw the possibility that this man or woman was a druid," he wrote:

"The so-called 'druid' could have been a doctor. The tea strainer contains artemisia pollen, which is commonly associated with herbal remedies. Healing is an attribute given to druids. We don't know what the metal rods are for, but we think they could have been used for divining. The question is whether all that stacks up to him [or her] being a druid. It could be – it was certainly somebody special."

The medical kit was "fairly Romanized" and the individual may have acted "like a Roman surgeon / doctor would have done." "Divination was widely practiced in the Roman world too," he added. Because of the site's age and location, archaeologist Mike Pitts believed the person was indeed a Celtic druid, and could have been closely related to Cunobelinus, a chief or king of the Catuvellauni tribe, known to Shakespeare as Cymbeline.

== The Stanway game ==
The grave contained a board game, with its blue and white glass board-pieces laid out ready for start of play. Surviving metal corners and hinges from the game board allowed a reconstruction to be created; it is believed to be a 55×40 centimetre (21×15 inch) rectangle with play over a board of 8×12 squares.

The white and blue glass tokens – 13 for each side – were ranged opposite each other, similar to the starting position in chess. All pieces were of equal size, except for a single, smaller white bead positioned close to the centre of the board.

Given the absence of dice, Finkel (2009) (Note: Dr. Irving Finkel is Assistant Keeper of the Ancient Mesopotamia collection in the Middle East department of the British Museum.) speculated that the game was purely strategic.

A detailed analysis of the game by Schädler (2007) argues that the game is neither Roman latrunculi, nor XII scripta, but in fact a relative of the Celtic game known as fidchell or gwyddbwyll. The find suggests the game was played on either 8×12 or 9×13 squares using 13 pieces per side. The presence of just one smaller bead may indicate that the game was asymmetrical, with a king-like piece belonging to one side, as in tafl games.

Alternatively, some people believe this board may have been used along with the metal rods for divining purposes.

In 2015, Colchester resident Alex Jones developed a board game he calls Aquila inspired by the Stanway game. At least one Aquila tournament was held at the Colchester Roman Circus Centre in September 2015.
