= Mann (chess) =

Fairy chess piece

White mann

Black mann

Common icons used in diagrams

The mann or man (plural mannen), is a fairy chess piece that may move to any adjoining square. It is similar to the king, but it is not a royal piece (i.e. it is not subject to check and checkmate), and it cannot castle. The mann is used in many chess variants. In this article the mann is represented by an inverted king.

== Movement ==
Position: e6 black circle, f6 black circle, g6 black circle, e5 black circle, f5 black upside-down king, g5 black circle, e4 black circle, f4 black circle, g4 black circle

Possible moves of the unhindered mann

The mann has the basic move of a king in chess: it may move to any adjoining square. It is otherwise treated as a normal chess piece (i.e. it can be captured and is not subject to check or checkmate). The mann is unable to castle. It can be thought of as the combination of a ferz and a wazir.

== Value ==
In general, the mann is approximately equal in strength and value to the knight. The mann often takes a few moves to get properly developed in the opening. It is effective at close proximity, where its striking power is considerable. Although it is rather slow, the mann is excellent at both attacking and defending nearby pieces and pawns, similar to the king. The mann reaches its peak strength during the endgame, in which its value is slightly more than a knight, despite being slightly less than a knight in the opening. It is possible to force checkmate with a mann and a king against a lone enemy king; since the enemy king cannot move to attack either, it is quite easy to box the king into a corner.

== History ==
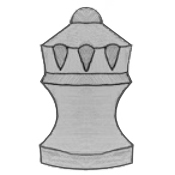
The Sage as how it may have appeared in Courier chess

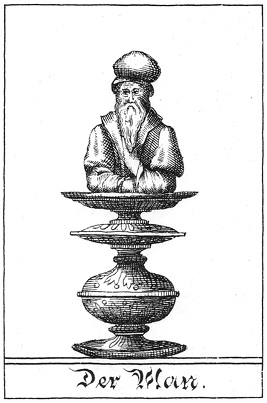
Illustration of the chess piece "Mann" by Gustav Selenus from the book Das Schach-Oder Konig-Spiel (1616)

The mann is one of the most simply described chess pieces and as such has a long history and has gone by many names. (Note: Names including: Man (in Courier chess), der Mann (im Kurierschach), Rath, Counsellor, Sage.) A similar piece known as the dabbaba was described c. 950 in a form of chess on a 10×10 board. The mann is used in Courier chess, invented in the 12th century and commonly played until the 18th century. Many chess variants have used the mann; modern instances include Quatrochess (as mann), Roman chess (as archer or chariot), Knightmate (as commoner), and 5D Chess with Multiverse Time Travel (as common king).

== Examples ==
Each mann is represented by an inverted king in the following examples.

Position: a8 black rook, b8 black upside-down king, c8 black bishop, d8 black queen, e8 C d, f8 black bishop, g8 black upside-down king, h8 black rook, a7 black pawn, b7 black pawn, c7 black pawn, d7 black pawn, e7 black pawn, f7 black pawn, g7 black pawn, h7 black pawn, a2 white pawn, b2 white pawn, c2 white pawn, d2 white pawn, e2 white pawn, f2 white pawn, g2 white pawn, h2 white pawn, a1 white rook, b1 white upside-down king, c1 white bishop, d1 white queen, e1 C e, f1 white bishop, g1 white upside-down king, h1 white rook

Knightmate starting position. To win, the royal knight must be mated.

	a	b	c	d	e	f	g	h	i	j
10	a10 black rook	b10 black knight	c10 black upside-down king	d10 black bishop	e10 black queen	f10 black king	g10 black bishop	h10 black upside-down king	i10 black knight	j10 black rook	10
9	a9 black pawn	b9 black pawn	c9 black pawn	d9 black pawn	e9 black pawn	f9 black pawn	g9 black pawn	h9 black pawn	i9 black pawn	j9 black pawn	9
8	a8	b8	c8	d8	e8	f8	g8	h8	i8	j8	8
7	a7	b7	c7	d7	e7	f7	g7	h7	i7	j7	7
6	a6	b6	c6	d6	e6	f6	g6	h6	i6	j6	6
5	a5	b5	c5	d5	e5	f5	g5	h5	i5	j5	5
4	a4	b4	c4	d4	e4	f4	g4	h4	i4	j4	4
3	a3	b3	c3	d3	e3	f3	g3	h3	i3	j3	3
2	a2 white pawn	b2 white pawn	c2 white pawn	d2 white pawn	e2 white pawn	f2 white pawn	g2 white pawn	h2 white pawn	i2 white pawn	j2 white pawn	2
1	a1 white rook	b1 white knight	c1 white upside-down king	d1 white bishop	e1 white queen	f1 white king	g1 white bishop	h1 white upside-down king	i1 white knight	j1 white rook	1
	a	b	c	d	e	f	g	h	i	j

Roman chess starting setup. White's Mannen are on c1/h1; Black's are on c10/h10.

	a	b	c	d	e	f	g	h	i	j	k	l	m	n
14	a14 k r	b14 B r	c14 c r	d14 r r	e14 p r	f14	g14	h14	i14	j14 black pawn	k14 black rook	l14 black queen	m14 black upside-down rook	n14 black king	14
13	a13 m r	b13 N r	c13 G r	d13 n r	e13 p r	f13	g13	h13	i13	j13 black pawn	k13 black knight	l13 black giraffe	m13 N d	n13 B d	13
12	a12 q r	b12 G r	c12 N r	d12 a r	e12 p r	f12	g12	h12	i12	j12 black pawn	k12 black bishop	l12 N d	m12 black giraffe	n12 black empress	12
11	a11 r r	b11 n r	c11 b r	d11 b r	e11 p r	f11	g11	h11	i11	j11 black pawn	k11 black bishop	l11 black princess	m11 black knight	n11 black rook	11
10	a10 p r	b10 p r	c10 p r	d10 p r	e10 f r	f10	g10	h10	i10	j10 black upside-down king	k10 black pawn	l10 black pawn	m10 black pawn	n10 black pawn	10
9	a9	b9	c9	d9	e9	f9	g9	h9	i9	j9	k9	l9	m9	n9	9
8	a8	b8	c8	d8	e8	f8	g8 w w	h8 w w	i8	j8	k8	l8	m8	n8	8
7	a7	b7	c7	d7	e7	f7	g7 w w	h7 w w	i7	j7	k7	l7	m7	n7	7
6	a6	b6	c6	d6	e6	f6	g6	h6	i6	j6	k6	l6	m6	n6	6
5	a5 white pawn	b5 white pawn	c5 white pawn	d5 white pawn	e5 white upside-down king	f5	g5	h5	i5	j5 f g	k5 p g	l5 p g	m5 p g	n5 p g	5
4	a4 white rook	b4 white knight	c4 white princess	d4 white bishop	e4 white pawn	f4	g4	h4	i4	j4 p g	k4 b g	l4 b g	m4 n g	n4 r g	4
3	a3 white empress	b3 white giraffe	c3 N l	d3 white bishop	e3 white pawn	f3	g3	h3	i3	j3 p g	k3 a g	l3 N g	m3 G g	n3 q g	3
2	a2 B l	b2 N l	c2 white giraffe	d2 white knight	e2 white pawn	f2	g2	h2	i2	j2 p g	k2 n g	l2 G g	m2 N g	n2 m g	2
1	a1 white king	b1 white upside-down rook	c1 white queen	d1 white rook	e1 white pawn	f1	g1	h1	i1	j1 p g	k1 r g	l1 c g	m1 B g	n1 k g	1
	a	b	c	d	e	f	g	h	i	j	k	l	m	n

Quatrochess starting setup. Mannen are on e5/e10/j10/j5
