= Chess piece =

Game piece for playing chess

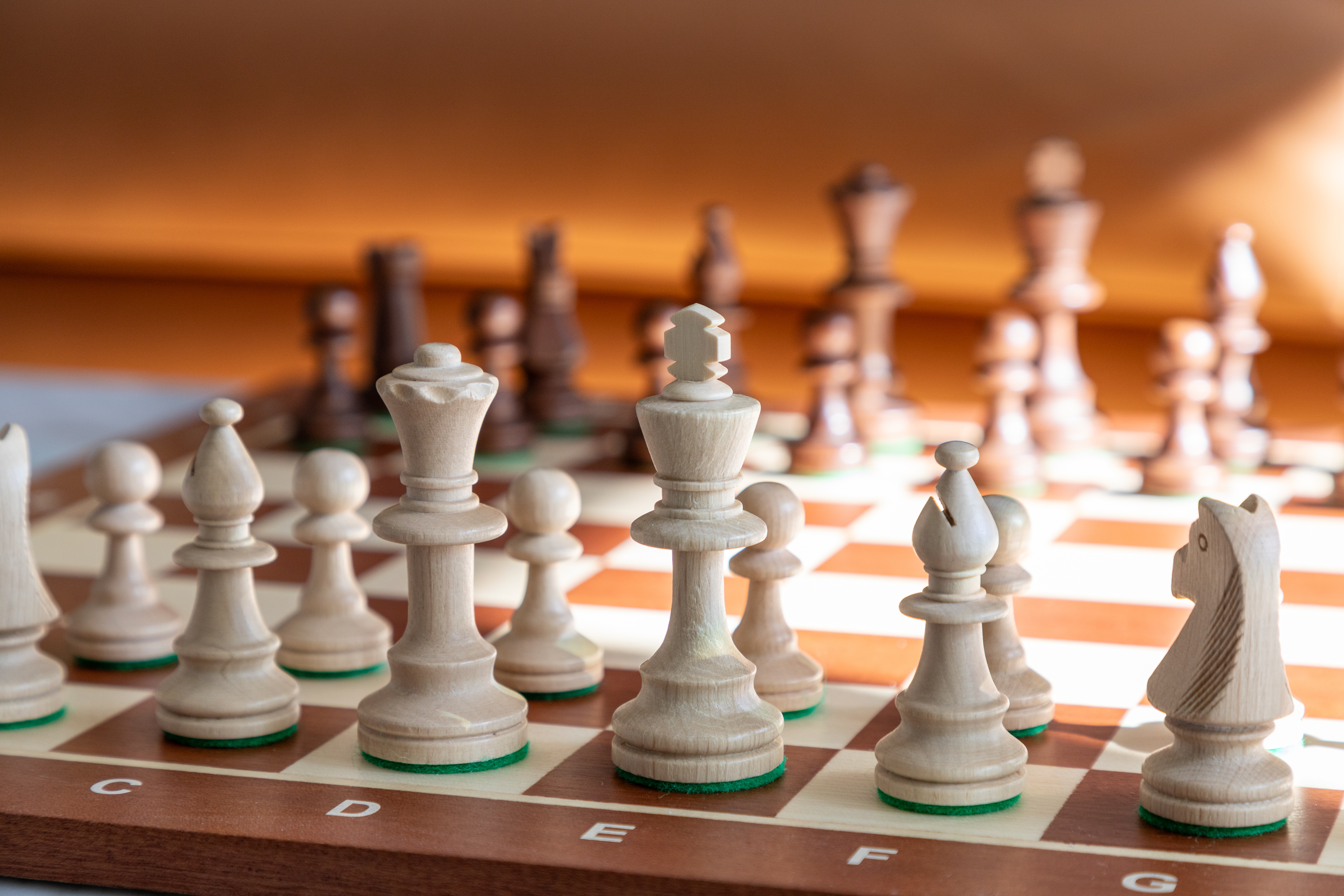
Polish Węgiel pieces

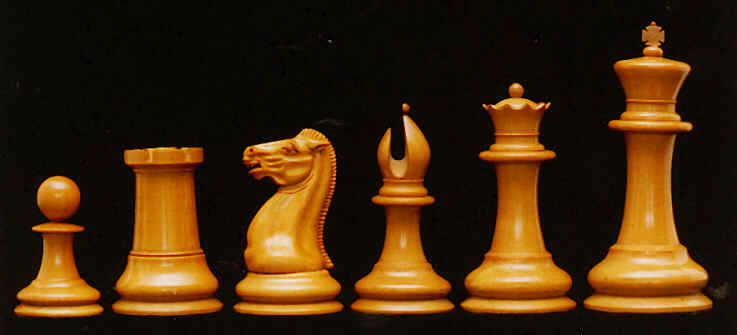
Original Staunton chess pieces Left to right: pawn, rook, knight, bishop, queen, king

A chess piece, or chessman, is a game piece that is placed on a chessboard to play the game of chess. It can be either white or black, and it can be one of six types: king, queen, rook, bishop, knight, or pawn.

Chess sets generally come with sixteen pieces of each color. Additional pieces, usually an extra queen per color, may be provided for use in promotion or handicap games.

== Number ==
Chess pieces
- : King

- : Queen

- : Rook

- : Bishop

- : Knight

- : Pawn

Each player begins with sixteen pieces (but see the subsection below for other usage of the term piece). The pieces that belong to each player are distinguished by color: the lighter colored pieces are referred to as "white" and the player that controls them as "White", whereas the darker colored pieces are referred to as "black" and the player that controls them as "Black".

In a standard game, each of the two players begins with the following sixteen pieces:

- 1 king
- 1 queen
- 2 rooks
- 2 bishops
- 2 knights
- 8 pawns

== Definitions ==
The word "piece" has three meanings, depending on the context.

1. It may mean any of the physical pieces of the set, including the pawns, but not including the chessboard. When used this way, "piece" is synonymous with "chessman" or simply "man". This usage can be seen in chess rule books, such as the FIDE Laws of Chess and the US Chess Federation’s Official Rules of Chess.
2. In play, the term is usually used to exclude pawns, referring only to a queen, rook, bishop, knight, or king. In this context, the pieces can be broken down into three groups: major pieces (queen and rooks), minor pieces (bishops and knights), and the king.
3. In phrases such as "winning a piece", "losing a piece" or "sacrificing a piece" and other related contexts, it refers only to minor pieces (bishops or knights). By convention, the queen, rooks, and pawns are specified by name in these cases – for example, "winning a queen", "losing a rook", or "sacrificing a pawn".

== Moves ==
Position: a8 black rook, b8 black knight, c8 black bishop, d8 black queen, e8 black king, f8 black bishop, g8 black knight, h8 black rook, a7 black pawn, b7 black pawn, c7 black pawn, d7 black pawn, e7 black pawn, f7 black pawn, g7 black pawn, h7 black pawn, a2 white pawn, b2 white pawn, c2 white pawn, d2 white pawn, e2 white pawn, f2 white pawn, g2 white pawn, h2 white pawn, a1 white rook, b1 white knight, c1 white bishop, d1 white queen, e1 white king, f1 white bishop, g1 white knight, h1 white rook

Chess starting position. Squares are referenced using algebraic notation.

The rules of chess prescribe the moves each type of chess piece can make. During play, the players take turns moving their own chess pieces.

- The rook may move any number of squares vertically or horizontally without jumping. It also takes part, along with the king, in castling.
- The bishop may move any number of squares diagonally without jumping. Consequently, a bishop stays on squares of the same color throughout the game.
- The queen may move any number of squares vertically, horizontally, or diagonally without jumping.
- The king may move to any adjoining square. No move may be made such that the king is placed or left in check. The king may participate in castling, which is a move consisting of the king moving two squares toward a same-colored rook on the same rank and the rook moving to the square crossed by the king. Castling may only be performed if the king and rook involved are unmoved, if the king is not in check, if the king would not travel through or into check, and if there are no pieces between the rook and the king.
- The knight moves from one corner of any two-by-three rectangle to the opposite corner. (This can be thought of as moving two squares horizontally then one square vertically, or moving one square horizontally then two squares vertically—i.e. in an "L" pattern.) Consequently, the knight alternates its square color each time it moves. It is not obstructed by other pieces.
- The pawn may move forward one square, and one or two squares when on its starting square, toward the opponent's side of the board. When there is an enemy piece one square diagonally ahead of a pawn, then the pawn may capture that piece. A pawn can perform a special type of capture of an enemy pawn called en passant ("in passing"), wherein it captures a horizontally adjacent enemy pawn that has just advanced two squares as if that pawn had only advanced one square. If the pawn reaches a square on the back rank of the opponent, it promotes to the player's choice of a queen, rook, bishop, or knight of the same color.

Pieces other than pawns capture in the same way that they move. A capturing piece replaces the opponent piece on its square, except for an en passant capture by a pawn. Captured pieces are immediately removed from the game. A square may hold only one piece at any given time. Except for castling and the knight's move, no piece may jump over another piece.

== Relative value ==
The value assigned to a piece attempts to represent the potential strength of the piece in the game. As the game develops, the relative values of the pieces will also change. For example, in an open game, bishops are relatively more valuable; they can be positioned to control long, open diagonal spaces. In a closed game with lines of protected pawns blocking bishops, knights usually become relatively more potent. Similar ideas apply to placing rooks on open files and knights on active, central squares. The standard valuation is one point for a pawn, three points for a knight or bishop, five points for a rook, and nine points for a queen. These values are reliable in endgames, particularly with a limited number of pieces. But these values can change depending on the position or the phase of the game (opening, middle game, or ending). A bishop pair for example, is worth an additional half-pawn on average. In specific circumstances, the values may be quite different: sometimes a knight can be more valuable than a queen if a particular angle is required for a mating attack, such as certain smothered mates. The humble pawn becomes more and more valuable the closer it is to securing a queen promotion for another example.

== Manufacture ==
Chess sets have been made in a variety of styles, sometimes for decorative or artistic purposes rather than practical play, but the Staunton pattern is standard for competition.

== History ==
Chess evolved over time from its earliest versions in India and Persia to variants that spread both West and East. Pieces changed names and rules as well; the most notable changes was the Vizir (or Firz) becoming the Queen, and the Elephant becoming the Bishop in European versions of chess. The movement patterns for Queens and Bishops also changed, with the earliest rules restricting elephants to just two squares along a diagonal, but allowing them to "jump" (seen in the fairy chess piece the alfil); and the earliest versions of queens could only move a single square diagonally (the fairy chess piece Ferz). The modern bishop's movement was popularized in the 14th and 15th centuries, and the modern queen was popularized in the 15th and 16th centuries, with versions with the more powerful modern queen eclipsing older variants.

Sample Medieval chess pieces

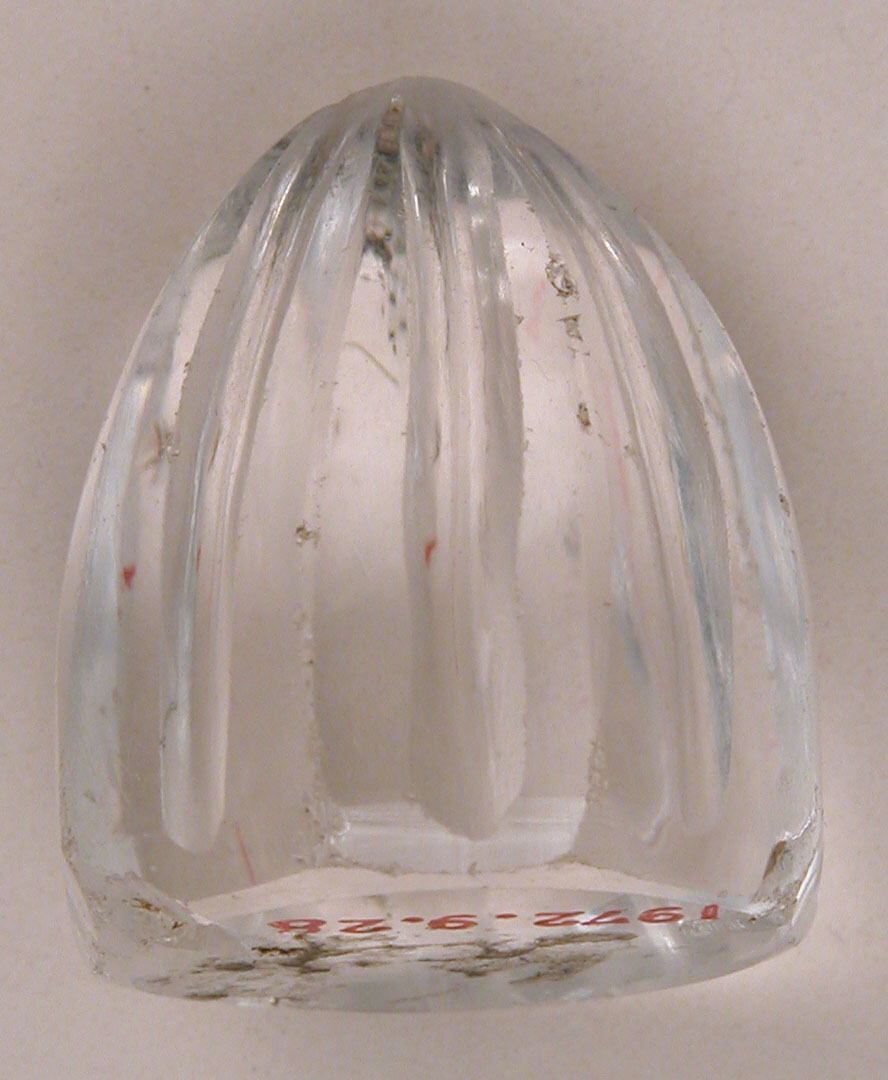
A pawn of quartz from 10th–11th century (Fatimid Egypt?). Islamic chess sets favored abstract designs.

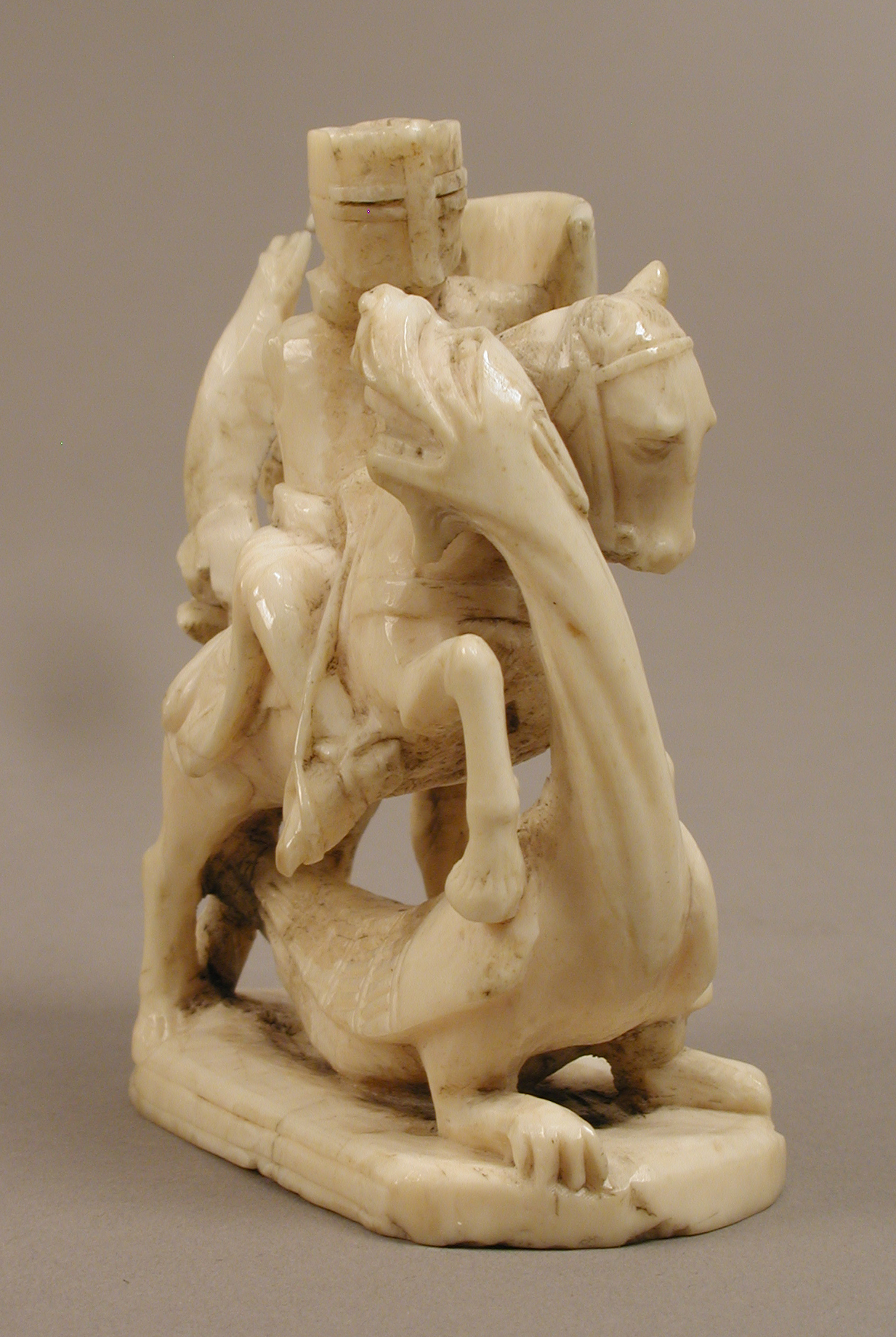
A knight made around 1250 in London, England. The knight is battling a dragon.

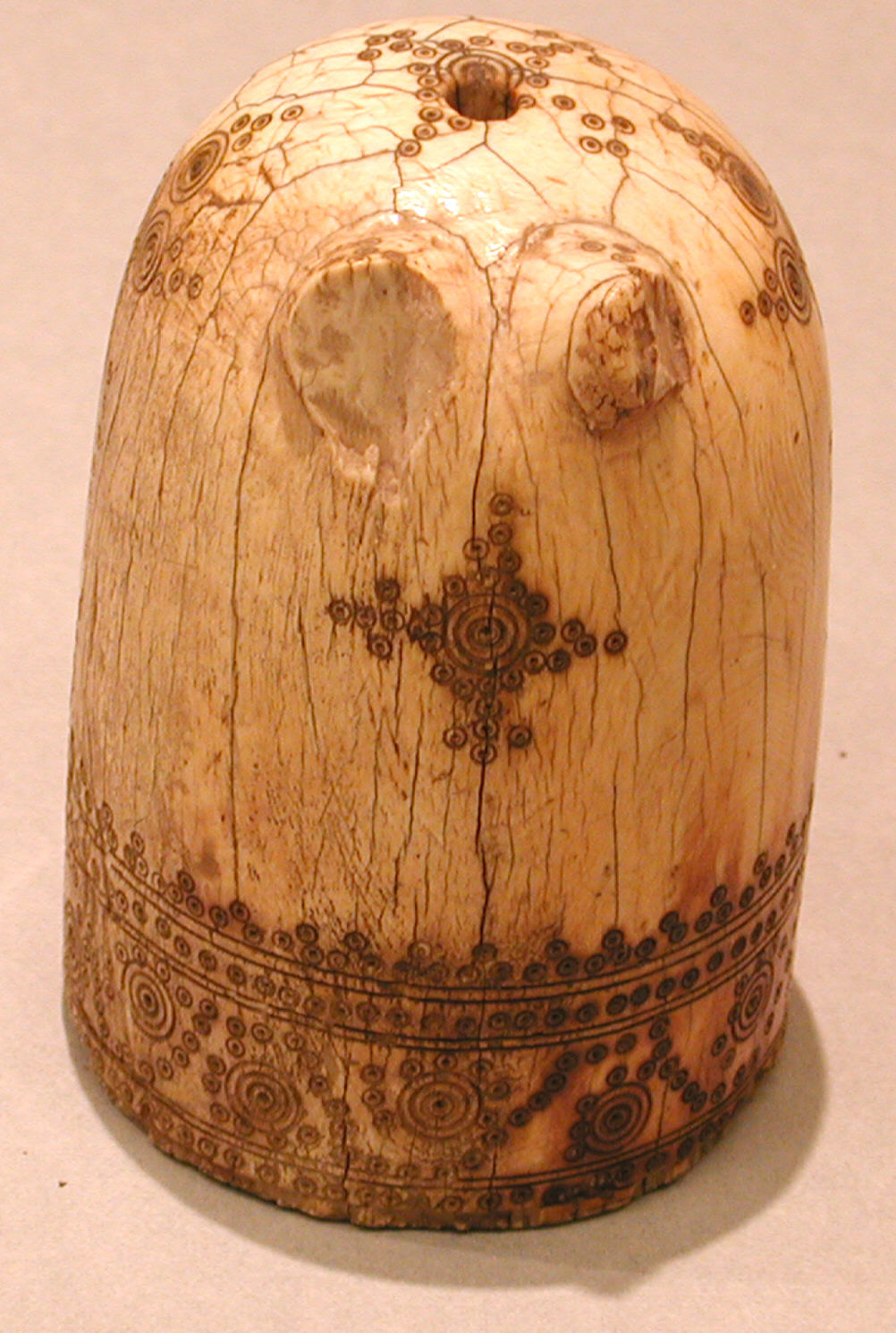
An elephant from the 11th–12th century Islamic Western Mediterranean (possibly Nasrid Granada?). It bears similarities to a Bishop's miter, perhaps explaining the eventual terminology shift.

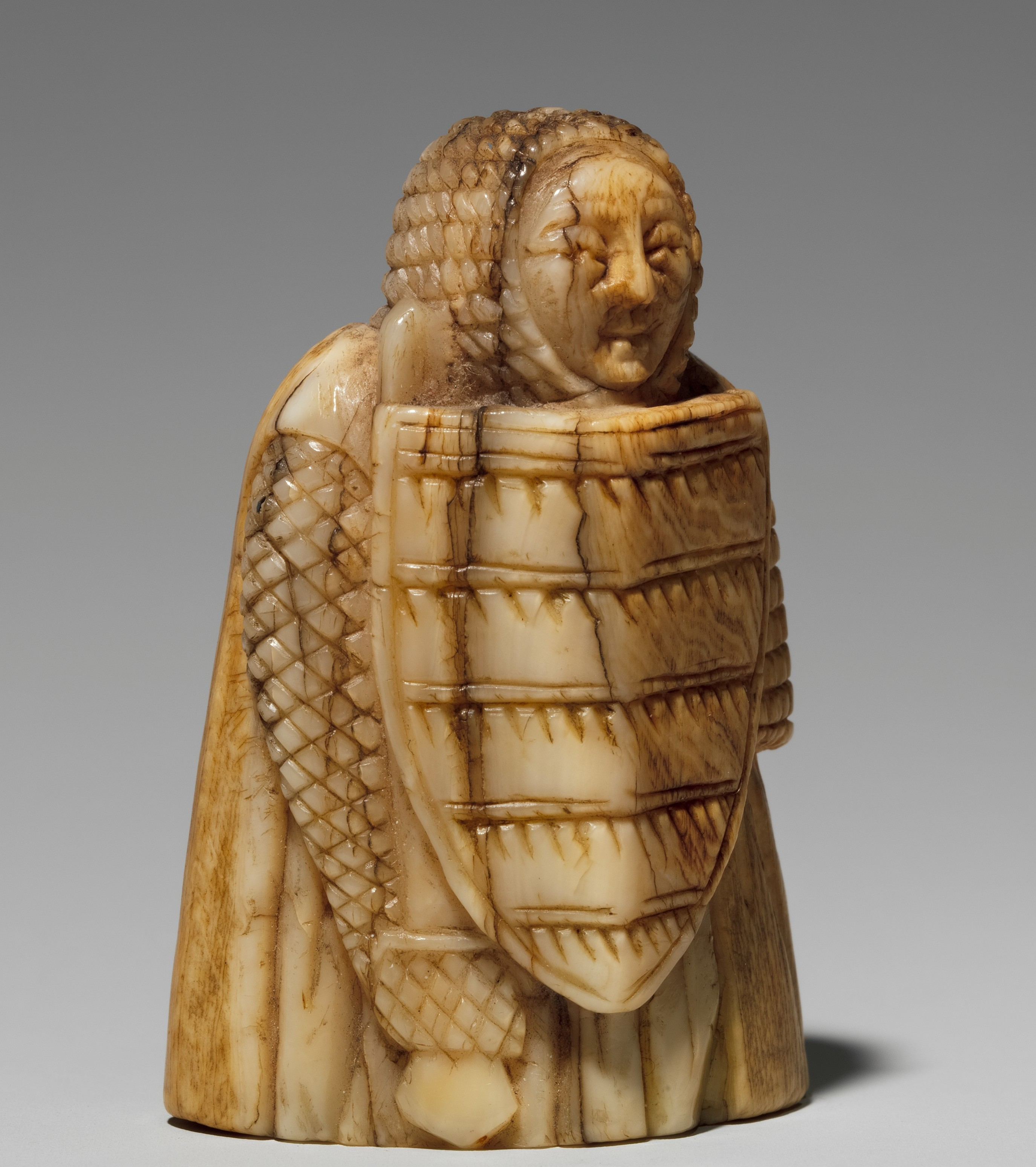
A 12th century warder (modern rook) made of whale ivory of Scandinavian origin, similar to the famous Lewis chessmen.

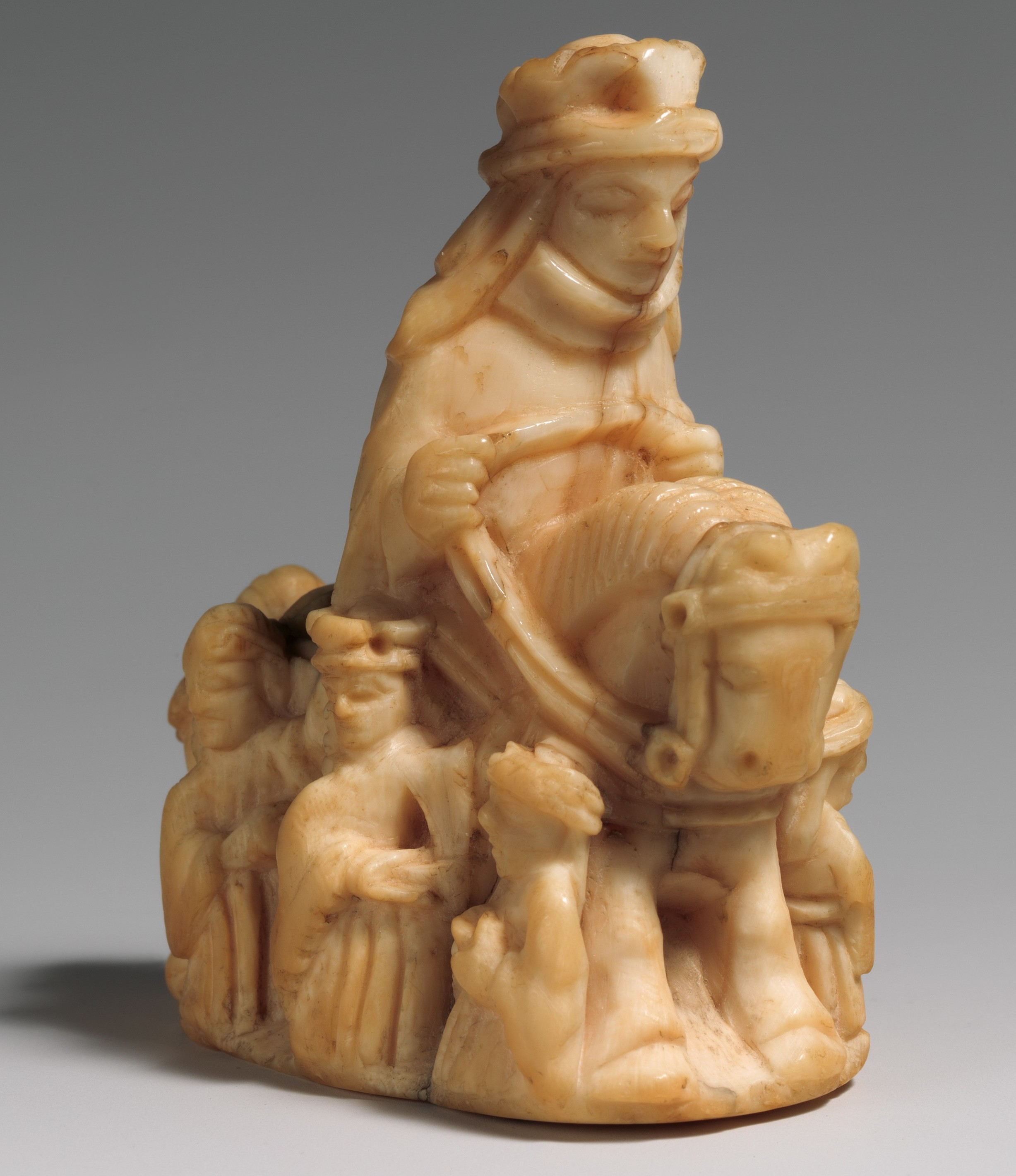
A 13th century Queen astride a horse with attendants, of Scandinavian origin. The Queen replaced the Persian Vizier in European chess.

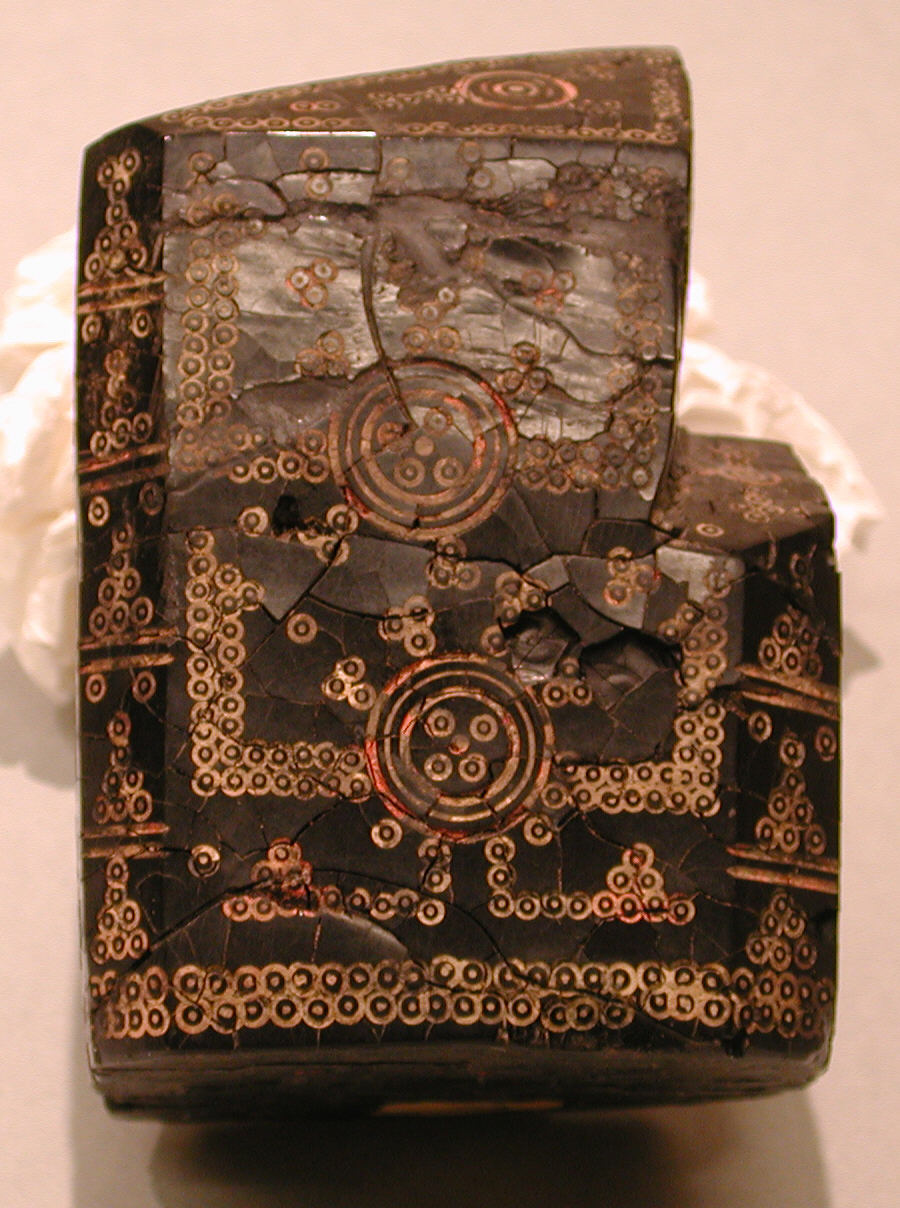
An 8th–10th century King (Shah) carved of jet. In the Islamic style, it is an abstract representation, decorated with dot-and-circle devices.

== Names ==
The characters implied by pieces' names vary between languages. For example, in many languages, the piece known in English as the "knight" frequently translates as "horse", and the English "bishop" frequently translates as "elephant" in language areas that adapted the modern bishop's movement pattern, but not its new name.

Overview of chess piece names
Language	King	Queen	Rook	Bishop	Knight	Pawn	Chess	Check	Checkmate/Mate
figure	♔ ♚	♕ ♛	♖ ♜	♗ ♝	♘ ♞	♙ ♟	n/a	+ or †	# or ++ or ‡
Adyghe	П пачъыхь / пщы (pachyh / pshy) king / prince	Г гуащэ / озир (gwashe / wezir) lady / vizier	Къ къалэ / къошъожъый (qale / qoshwozhyy) fortress / boat	Пл пыл (pyl) elephant	Ш шы (shy) horse	(Лъ) лъэс / дзэ (lhes / dze) foot soldier / army	сэнтӀыращ / шахмат (sent'yrash / shakhmat)	шах (shakh)	мат (mat)
Afrikaans	K Koning king	D Dame lady	T Toring tower	L Loper runner	R Ruiter rider	(P) Pion	Skaak	Skaak	Skaakmat
Albanian	M Mbreti king	D Dama / Mbretëresha lady / queen	T Torra tower	F Fili / Oficeri elephant / officer	K Kali horse	(U) Ushtari soldier	Shahu	Shah	Shah mat
Arabic	م مَلِك (malik) king	و وزير (wazïr) vizier	ر رخ / طابية (rukhkh / ṭābiya) fortress / castle	ف فيل (fīl) elephant	ح حصان (ħiṣān) horse	ب بيدق / عسكري (baidaq / `askarī) pawn / soldier	شطرنج (shaṭranj)	كِش مَلِك (kish malik)	كِش مات (kish māt)
Azerbaijani	Ş Şah shah	V Vəzir vizier	T Top cannon	F Fil elephant	A At horse	P Piyada foot soldier	Şahmat	şah shah	mat mat
Armenian	Ա Արքա (Ark῾a) king	Թ Թագուհի (T῾agowhi) queen	Ն Նավակ (Navak) ship	Փ Փիղ (P῾ił) elephant	Ձ Ձի (Dzi) horse	Զ Զինվոր (Zinvor) soldier	Շախմատ (Šaxmat); Ճատրակ (Čatrak)	Շախ (Šax)	Մատ (Mat)
Basque	E Erregea king	D Dama lady	G Gaztelua castle	A Alfila elephant	Z Zalduna knight	(P) Peoia pawn	Xake	Xake	Xake mate
Belarusian (Taraškievica)	К кароль king	Вз візыр vizier	Лд ладзьдзя boat	А афіцэр officer	В вершнік rider	(Л) латнік pawn	Шахматы	Шах	Мат
Bengali	R রাজা (rājā); King	M মন্ত্রী (montri); Minister	N নৌকা (noukā); Boat	H গজ / হাতি (gôj / hāti) elephant	G ঘোড়া (ghoṛā); Horse	B বোড়ে / সৈন্য (boṛe / śoinno); Walker / Troop	দাবা (dābā)	কিস্তি (kisti); Check	কিস্তিমাত (kistimāt); Checkmate
Bulgarian	Ц цар tsar	Д дама / царица lady / queen	Т топ cannon	О офицер officer	К кон horse	(П) пешка foot soldier	Шахмат / Шах	Шах	(Шах и) мат
Catalan	R rei	D dama / reina lady / queen	T torre tower	A alfil elephant	C cavall horse	(P) peó	Escacs	Escac / Xec	Escac i mat
Chinese	K 王 (wáng) king / 王	Q 后 (hòu) queen / 后	R 車 (jū) chariot / 车	B 象 (xiàng) elephant / 象	N 馬 (mǎ) horse / 马	(P) 兵 (bīng) soldier / 兵	國際象棋 (guójì xiàngqí) international chess / 西洋棋 (xīyáng qí) western chess	將軍 (jiāngjūn)	將死 (jiāng sǐ)
Czech	K král king	D dáma lady	V věž tower	S střelec shooter	J jezdec rider	(P) pěšec foot soldier	Šachy	Šach	Mat
Danish	K konge king	D dronning queen	T tårn tower	L løber runner	S springer jumper	(B) bonde peasant	Skak	Skak	Skakmat
Dutch	K koning king	D dame / koningin lady / queen	T toren / kasteel tower / castle	L loper / raadsheer runner / counsellor	P paard horse	(pi) pion	Schaken	Schaak	Mat / Schaakmat
English	K king	Q queen	R rook, castle	B bishop	N knight	(P) pawn	Chess	Check	Checkmate / Mate
Esperanto	R reĝo king	D damo lady	T turo tower	K kuriero courier	Ĉ ĉevalo horse	(P) peono	Ŝako	Ŝak	Ŝakmato
Estonian	K kuningas king	L lipp flag	V vanker chariot / carriage	O oda spear	R ratsu riding horse	(E) ettur forwarder	Male after malev	Tuli / Šahh fire	Matt
Finnish	K kuningas king	D daami / kuningatar lady / queen	T torni tower	L lähetti messenger	R ratsu ride	(S) sotilas soldier	Shakki	Shakki	Matti / Shakkimatti
French	R roi king	D dame / reine lady / queen	T tour tower	F fou jester	C cavalier / cheval rider / horse	(P) pion	Échecs	Échec	Échec et mat
Galician	R rei king	D dama / raíña lady / queen	T torre tower	B bispo bishop	C cabalo horse	(P) peón foot soldier	Xadrez	Xaque	Xaque mate
Georgian	მფ მეფე (mep'e) king	ლ ლაზიერი (lazieri) queen	ე ეტლი (etli) chariot	კ კუ (ku) tortoise	მ მხედარი (mkhedari) rider	პ პაიკი (paiki) pawn	ჭადრაკი (Čadraki)	ქიში (K'ishi)	შამათი (Shamat'i)
German	K König king	D Dame lady / queen	T Turm tower	L Läufer runner	S Springer jumper	(B) Bauer peasant / farmer	Schach	Schach	Matt / Schachmatt
Greek	Ρ βασιλιάς (vasiliás) king	Β βασίλισσα (vasílissa) queen	Π πύργος (pýrgos) tower	Α αξιωματικός (axiomatikós) officer	Ι ίππος (íppos) horse	(Σ) πιόνι (pióni) pawn	Σκάκι (Skáki)	Σαχ (Sach) / Ρουά (Rouá)	Mατ (Mat)
Hindi	R राजा (rājā) king	V वज़ीर / रानी (vazīr / rānī) vizier / queen	H हाथी (hāthī) elephant	O ऊँट (ūṁṭ) camel	G घोड़ा (ghoṛā) horse	(P) प्यादा (pyādā) infantryman	शतरंज (śatrañj)	शह (Shah)	शहमात (Shahmāt)
Hebrew	מ מלך (Melekh) king	מה מלכה (Malka) queen	צ צריח (Tsari'aẖ) tower	ר רץ (Rats) runner Medieval: פיל (Pil), elephant	פ פרש (Parash) horseman	רגלי (Ragli) foot soldier	שחמט (Shaẖmat)	שח (Shaẖ)	מט (Mat)
Hausa	S sarki king	Q sarauniya queen	R sansanin fortress	G giwa elephant	J jarumi mounted warrior	(P) soja soldier	ces	ceki	ceki mat
Hungarian	K király king	V vezér / királynő leader / queen	B bástya bastion	F futó runner	H huszár / ló hussar / horse	(Gy) gyalog / paraszt footman / peasant	Sakk	Sakk	Matt / Sakk-matt
Icelandic	K kóngur king	D drottning queen	H hrókur rook	B biskup bishop	R riddari knight	(P) peð pawn	Skák	Skák	Skák og mát
Ido	R rejo king	D damo lady	T turmo tower	E episkopo bishop	K kavalo horse	(P) piono	Shakoludo	Shako	Shakmato
Indonesian	R raja king	M menteri minister / vizier	B benteng castle / fortress	G gajah elephant	K kuda horse	(P) pion	Catur	Sekak / Ster	Sekakmat
Interslavic	K kralj king	C carica / dama empress / lady	Z zamok / věža castle / tower	L lovec hunter	J jezdec / konj rider / horse	(P) pěšak infantryman	Šahy	Šah	Mat
Irish	R rí king	B banríon queen	C caiseal bulwark	E easpag bishop	D ridire knight	(F) fichillín / ceithearnach little chess piece / kern	Ficheall	Sáinn	Marbhsháinn
Italian	R re king	D donna / regina lady / queen	T torre tower	A alfiere ensign	C cavallo horse	(P) pedone foot soldier	Scacchi	Scacco	Scacco matto
Japanese	K キング (kingu) / 王 王将 (ōshō)	Q クイーン (kuīn) / 奔 奔王 (hon'ō)	R ルーク (rūku) / 飛 飛車 (hisha)	B ビショップ (bishoppu) / 角 角行 (kakugyō) bishop / angle-mover	N ナイト (naito) / 桂 八方桂 (happōkei)	(P) ポーン (pōn) / 歩 歩兵 (fuhyō)	チェス (chesu) / 西洋将棋 (seiyō shōgi)	王手 (ōte) / チェック (chekku)	詰み (tsumi) / チェックメイト (chekkumeito)
Javanese	R raja king	Q ratu / perdhana mentri queen / prime minister	B bèntèng fortress	M mentri minister	K jaran horse	(P) pion	sekak		
Kannada	ರಾ ರಾಜ (raaja) king	ಮ ಮಂತ್ರಿ (mantri) minister	ರ ರಥ (ratha) chariot	ಆ ಆನೆ (aane) elephant	ಕು ಕುದುರೆ (kudure) horse	ಪಾ ಪದಾತಿ (padaati) foot soldier	ಚದುರಂಗ (caduraṅga)		
Kabardian	П пащтыхь / пщы (pashtyh / pshy) king / prince	Г гуащэ / уэзир (gwashe / wezir) lady / vizier	Къ къалэ / кхъуафэжьей (qale / qhwafezhey) fortress / boat	Пл пыл (pyl) elephant	Ш шы (shy) horse	(Лъ) лъэс / дзэ (lhes / dze) foot soldier / army	шахмат (shakhmat)	шах (shakh)	мат (mat)
Kazakh	Кр патша (patşa) king	У уәзір (uäzır) vizier	Т тура (tura) tower	П піл (pıl) elephant	А ат (at) horse	(П) пешка (peşka) / (С) сарбаз (sarbaz) foot soldier / warrior	шахмат (şahmat)	шах (şah)	мат (mat)
Korean	K 킹 (king)	Q 퀸 (kwin)	R 룩 (rug)	B 비숍 (bi syob)	N 나이트 (na i teu)	(P) 폰 (pon)	체스 (che seu)	체크 (che keu)	체크메이트 (che keu me i teu)
Latin	R rex king	D domina queen	T turris / elephas tower / elephant	S signifer / cursor / stultus / alphinus standard-bearer / messenger / fool	E eques knight	(P) pedes / pedo foot soldier	Scacci	Scaccus	Mattus
Latvian	K karalis king	D dāma lady	T tornis tower	L laidnis	Z zirgs horse	(B) bandinieks peasant	Šahs	Šahs	Šahs un mats
Lithuanian	K karalius king	V valdovė queen	B bokštas tower	R rikis Lithuanian military commander	Ž žirgas horse	(P) pėstininkas pawn	Šachmatai	Šach	Matas
Luxembourgish	K Kinnek king	D Damm lady	T Tuerm tower	L Leefer runner	S Sprénger jumper	(B) Bauer farmer	Schach	Schach	Matt / Schachmatt
Macedonian	K крал king	D кралица / дама queen / lady	T топ cannon	L ловец hunter	S коњ / скокач horse / jumper	P пешак / пион infantryman / pawn	шах	шах	мат
Malayalam	K രാജാവ് (raajavu) king	Q മന്ത്രി (manthri) minister	R തേര് (therú) chariot	B ആന (aana) elephant	N/Kt കുതിര (kuthira) horse	(P) കാലാള്‍ / പടയാളി (kaalal / padayaali) foot soldier	ചതുരംഗം (chathurangam)	ചെക്ക്	ചെക്ക് മേറ്റ്
Marathi	R राजा (rājā) king	V वजीर (vajīr) vizier	H हत्ती (hātti) elephant	O उंट (Unṭ) camel	G घोडा (ghoḍā) horse	(P) प्यादे (pyāde) foot soldier	बुद्धिबळ (buddhibal)	शह (shah)	शहमात (shahmāt)
Mongolian	Н ноён noyan	Б бэрс (bers)	т тэрэг (tereg) chariot	Т тэмээ (temee) camel	М морь (mor) horse	(Х) хүү (hüü) boy	Шатар	шаг / дуг / цод	мад
Norwegian Bokmål	K konge king	D dronning queen	T tårn tower	L løper runner	S springer jumper	(B) bonde peasant	Sjakk	Sjakk	Sjakkmatt
Norwegian Nynorsk	K konge king	D dronning queen	T tårn tower	L løpar runner	S springar jumper	(B) bonde peasant	Sjakk	Sjakk	Sjakkmatt
Odia	K ରଜା (rôja) king	Q ରାଣୀ (raṇi) queen	R ଡଙ୍ଗା (ḍôṅga) boat	B ହାତୀ (hati) elephant	N ଘୋଡ଼ା (ghoṛa) horse	P ସୈନିକ (sôinikô) soldier	ଚେସ୍/ଶତରଞ୍ଜ (chess/śôtôrôñjô)	ଚେକ୍ (check)	ଚେକମେଟ୍ (checkmate)
Oromo	M Mootii	Mt Mootittii	G Gidaara, masaraa	A abuunii	N namkabajaa	Cheezii	Mirkaneeffannaa	Waayila / Mate	
Persian	ش شاه king	و وزیر vizier / minister	ق/ر قلعه/رخ castle	ف فیل elephant	ا اسب horse	س/پ سرباز/پیاده soldier	شطرنج (shatranj)	کیش (kish)	مات (mat)
Polish	K król king	H hetman / królowa general (hist.) / queen	W wieża tower	G goniec / laufer courier / (ger. derived)	S skoczek / koń jumper / horse	(P) pion / pionek pawn	Szachy	szach	mat / szach-mat
Portuguese	R rei king	D dama / rainha lady / queen	T torre tower	B bispo bishop	C cavalo horse	(P) peão foot soldier	Xadrez	Xeque	Xeque-mate
Romanian	R rege king	D damă / regină lady / queen	T turn / tură tower	N nebun fool	C cal horse	(P) pion	Șah	Șah	Mat / Șah mat
Russian	Кр король (korol') king	Ф ферзь / королева (ferz' / koroleva) vizier / queen	Л ладья (ladya) boat	С слон (slon) elephant	К конь (kon') horse	(П) пешка (peshka)	шахматы (shakhmaty)	шах (shakh)	мат (mat)
Scottish Gaelic	R righ king	B bànrigh queen	T tùr tower	E easbaig bishop	D ridir knight	(P) pàn pawn	feòirne	casg	tul-chasg
Serbo-Croatian	K kralj (К краљ) king	D kraljica / dama (Д краљицa / дама) queen / lady	T top / kula (Т топ / кула) cannon / tower	L lovac / strijelac / laufer (Л ловац / стрелац / лауфер) hunter / archer / runner	S skakač / konj (С скaкaч / коњ) jumper / horse	(P) pješak / pion / pijun ((П) пешак / пион / пијун) footman / pawn	Šah (Шах)	Šah (Шах)	Mat (Мат)
Northern Sotho	K Kgoši	Kg Kgošigadi	N Ntlosebô / Moshate	Mp Mopišopo bishop	M Mogale	S Seitšhireletšo	Tšhêšê	Check	Checkmate
Sicilian	R re king	D riggina queen	T turru tower	A alferu elephant	S scecc[h]u donkey	(P) pidinu foot soldier	Scacchi		
Slovak	K kráľ king	D dáma lady	V veža tower	S strelec shooter	J jazdec rider	(P) pešiak infantryman / pawn	Šach	Šach	Mat / Šachmat
Slovene	K kralj king	D dama lady	T trdnjava castle	L lovec hunter	S skakač jumper	(P) kmet farmer	Šah	Šah	Mat / Šahmat
Spanish	R rey king	D dama / reina lady / queen	T torre tower	A alfil elephant	C caballo horse	(P) peón foot soldier	Ajedrez	Jaque	Jaque mate
Swedish	K kung king	D dam / drottning lady / queen	T torn tower	L löpare runner	H springare / riddare horse/knight	(B) bonde peasant	Schack	Schack	Schack matt
Tamil	K அரசன் (arasaṉ) king	Q அரசி (araci) queen	R கோட்டை (kōṭṭai) castle	B அமைச்சர் / மந்திரி (amaicchar / manthiri) minister	N/Kt குதிரை (kutirai) horse	(P) காலாள் / சிப்பாய் (kālāḷ / cippāy) foot soldier / sepoy	சதுரங்கம் (sathurankam)	முற்றுகை (muṟṟukai)	இறுதி முற்றுகை (iṟuti muṟṟukai)
Telugu	రాజు (rāju) king	మంత్రి (maṃtri) minister	ఏనుగు (ēnugu) elephant	శకటు (śakaţu)	గుర్రం (gurraṃ) horse	బంటు (baṃţu) soldier	చదరంగం (cadaraṃgaṃ)	దాడి (dāḍi)	కట్టు (kaţţu)
Thai	ข ขุน (khun) king	ต เม็ด / ตรี / มนตรี (met / tri / montri) counselor	ร เรือ (ruea) ship	ค โคน (khon)	ม ม้า (ma) horse	(บ) เบี้ย (bia) menial	หมากรุก (makruk)	รุก (ruk)	จน (chon)
Turkish	Ş şah shah	V vezir vizier	K kale castle	F fil elephant	A at horse	(P) piyon	Satranç	Şah	Mat
Ukrainian	Kр король (korol) king	Ф ферзь (ferz) vizier	T тура (tura) tower	C слон (slon) elephant	K кінь (kin) horse	(П) пішак / пішка (pishak / pishka) foot soldier	Шахи (shakhi)	Шах (shakh)	Мат (mat)
Urdu	بادشاہ (bādshāh)	وزیر (vazīr)	رخ (rukh)	فيلہ (fīlah) elephant	گھوڑا (ghōṛā)	پیادہ (pyādah)	شطرنج (šaṭranj)	شہ (sheh)	شہمات (shehmāt)
Uzbek	Sh shoh shah	Fz farzin	R rux	F fil elephant	O ot horse	(P) piyoda foot soldier	Shaxmat	Kisht / Shoh	Mot
Vietnamese	V vua king	H hậu queen	X xe chariot	T tượng / tịnh / voi elephant	M mã / ngựa horse	tốt / chốt / binh soldier	Cờ vua	Chiếu / Chiếu tướng	Chiếu bí / Chiếu hết / Sát cục / Tuyệt sát
Welsh	T teyrn / brenin lord / king	B brenhines queen	C castell castle	E esgob bishop	M marchog rider	(G) gwerinwr peasant	Gwyddbwyll	Siach	Siachmat

== Variants ==
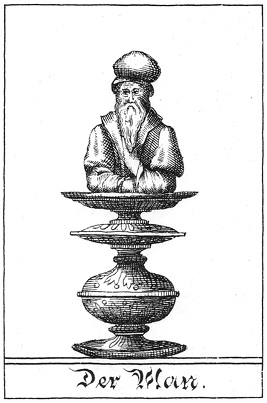
A 1616 illustration of the Mann, a chess piece unique to the Courier Chess variant; the Mann moves like a King, but threatening it does not give check, and it can be captured without loss of the game.

Chess variants sometimes include new, non-standard, or even old pieces. For example, Courier Chess, a predecessor of modern chess dating from the 12th century, was played on an 8×12 board and used all six modern chess piece types, plus three additional types of pieces: Courier, Mann (or rath or sage), and Jester. Variants of "old" chess might use the old rules for bishops/elephants with the alfil piece, or old rules for Queens with the ferz. Many modern variants with unorthodox pieces exist, such as Berolina chess which uses custom pawns that advance diagonally and capture vertically.

== See also ==
- Chess set
- Chessboard
- Chess piece relative value
- Chess symbols in Unicode
- Fairy chess piece – a piece used only in chess variants
- History of chess
- Lewis chessmen
- Outline of chess
- Rules of chess
- Staunton chess set
