= Polis (board game) =

Ancient Greek strategy game

Polis (Greek: πόλις, lit. 'city-state'), also known as Petteia, was an ancient Greek board game. One of the earliest known strategy games and wargames, the original rules of the game have been only partially preserved and resemble checkers. Its name appears in the Ancient Greek literature from around 450 BC to the 2nd century BC, and it seems to have been widely known in the region, particularly in Athens.

The game might have had a cultural significance to the Ancient Greeks, with the process of learning the game mentioned in works of several Ancient Greek philosophers as part of a philosophical education of educating children as a citizen of the city.

== History ==
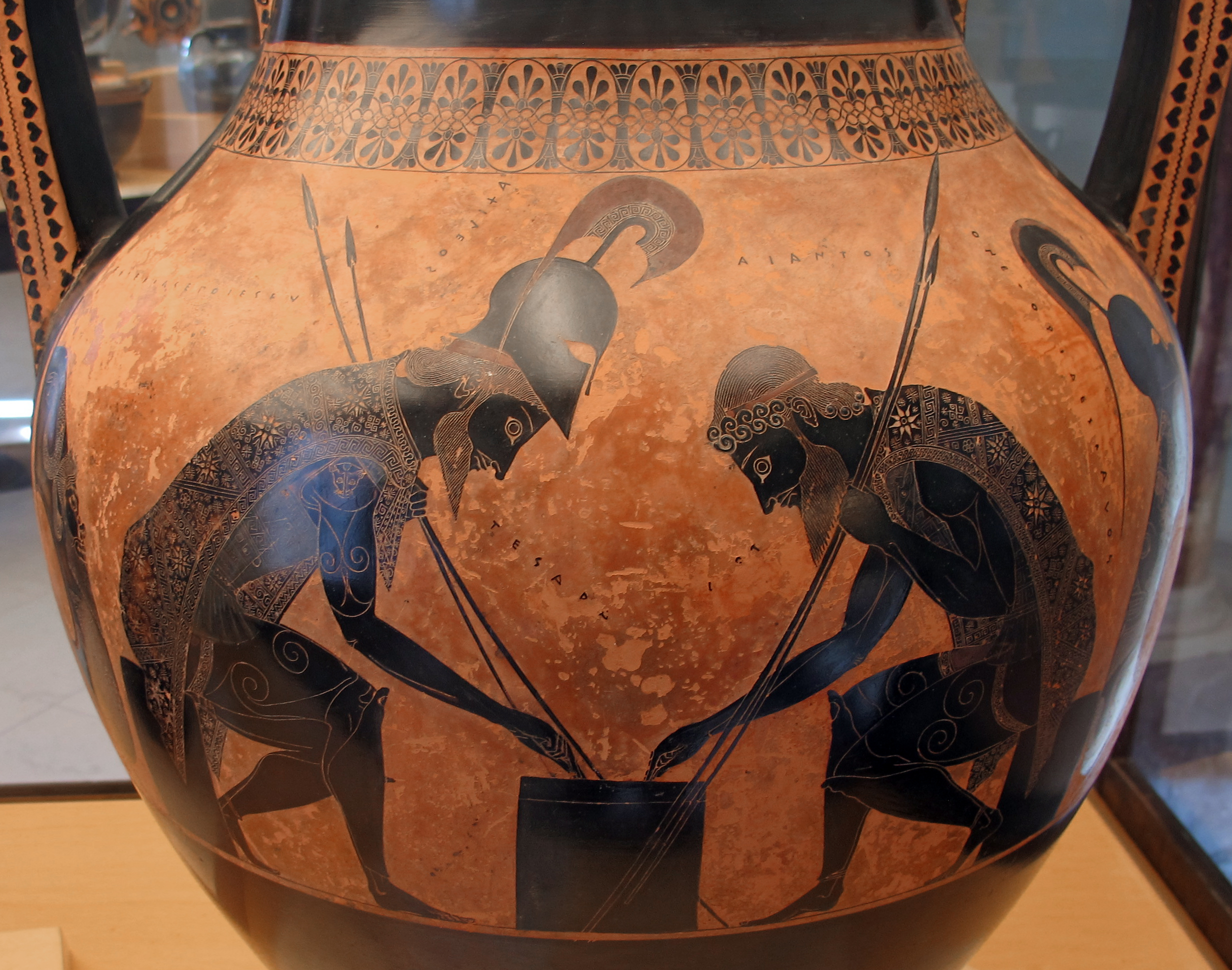
Achilles and Ajax playing a game, sometimes identified as polis (at other times, as five lines); a common subject in ancient Greek painted pottery

As with many ancient games, not much is known about polis, including where, when, and by whom it was invented. The earliest known reference to polis comes from Cratinos, an Athenian comedic poet, in his comedy Drapetides ("Female Runaways"), from 443/442 BC. The game was praised by Plato and Polybius, and possibly Philostratus, "as a game of strategy requiring great tactical skill". It was also likely referred to by Aristotle and Socrates. References to it are found in numerous other texts, suggesting that by mid-5th century BC the game was well known to ancient Greeks and was played until at least 2nd century BC.

In Ancient Greek mythology and painted pottery, Achilles and Ajax are sometimes shown playing a game, which invention has been credited to Palamedes. However, no literary source is known to provide context for the illustrations on the painted pottery. This has led to the game being sometimes identified as polis, while at other times, as five lines (a dice game).

== Rules ==
The rules of the game have been lost to time and are only partially understood today. Many aspects of the game are unknown, such as the shape of the board, its initial setup, or how the pieces moved. The game is generally understood as resembling checkers but with a different mode of capture (pieces were captured by enclosure from two sides). It was a symmetrical game of elimination for two players, each playing with pieces of their color. It probably had no random elements, and the pieces moved in all directions on a square board. The strategy involved maintaining formation and avoiding situations where one's pieces were isolated.

Some rules of the game were described by Julius Pollux in his Onomasticon. The board, like the game, was called polis, and featured a grid (although it is also possible that each space on the board was called a polis as well). The pieces, called "dogs", came in two colors and probably numbered thirty per player (sixty in total, however, this number has been disputed). Sources are contradictory on whether there were differences between pieces (some assume there were none; others are more cautious and state this was likely the case but underscore that primary sources are unclear on this topic). It is also unclear whether the game involved dice rolling (such a claim was made by Eustathius of Thessalonica but it could have been a mistake).

According to a caption of an illustration in a scholarly article published in 2021, a game board for polis was found in Rhamnous; however an article by Max Nelson from the previous year (2020) states that no game board associated with this game had been found at this date.

The game may be similar to the Ancient Roman game of ludus latrunculorum and might have served as its inspiration; it has also been suggested that polis, possibly, has been one of the influences on chess. Moreover, polis might have had connections to the traditional Egyptian game of seega.

A plausible but speculative reconstruction of the game rules were suggested by Nelson in 2020.

== Significance ==
Ancient Greeks saw an educational value of polis developing skills to learn and follow a set of rules. Leslie Kurke argued that the game had a cultural significance seen as a guide that "formed a Greek boy as a citizen of the city". The process of learning the game of polis is mentioned as part of a philosophical education in works of Ancient Greek philosophers.

Thierry Depaulis recognized the game as one of the oldest known strategy games (alongside the Chinese game of Go). (Note: Go is dated by the Chinese sources to a similar era as the oldest mentions of polis; however, Go, unlike polis, remains popular to this day.) Depaulis argued that invention of such games was one of the signs of the Axial Age (emergence of more complex thinking patterns, such as philosophy), as people moved from playing pure games of chance (such as dice games and race games) to strategy games.

The game has also been called one of the earliest wargames. Nelson notes that it is the "first known game of its kind (a war game on a grid-board)". He nonetheless suggested that thematically the game was less of a depiction of military conflict (wars between Greek city-states) and more of a celebration of the founding of the city state of Athens, with which he believes it was mainly associated.
