= Five Lines =

Ancient Greek board game

A reconstructed Five Lines game – dotted icons represent the pieces' target positions on the sacred line.

Five Lines (Greek: πέντε γραμμαί, romanized: pente grammai) is the modern name of an ancient Greek tables game. Two players each move five counters on a board with five lines, with moves likely determined by the roll of a die. The winner may have been the first one to place their pieces on the central "sacred line". No complete description of the game exists, but there have been several scholarly reconstructions, including Schädler's and Kidd's.

== History ==
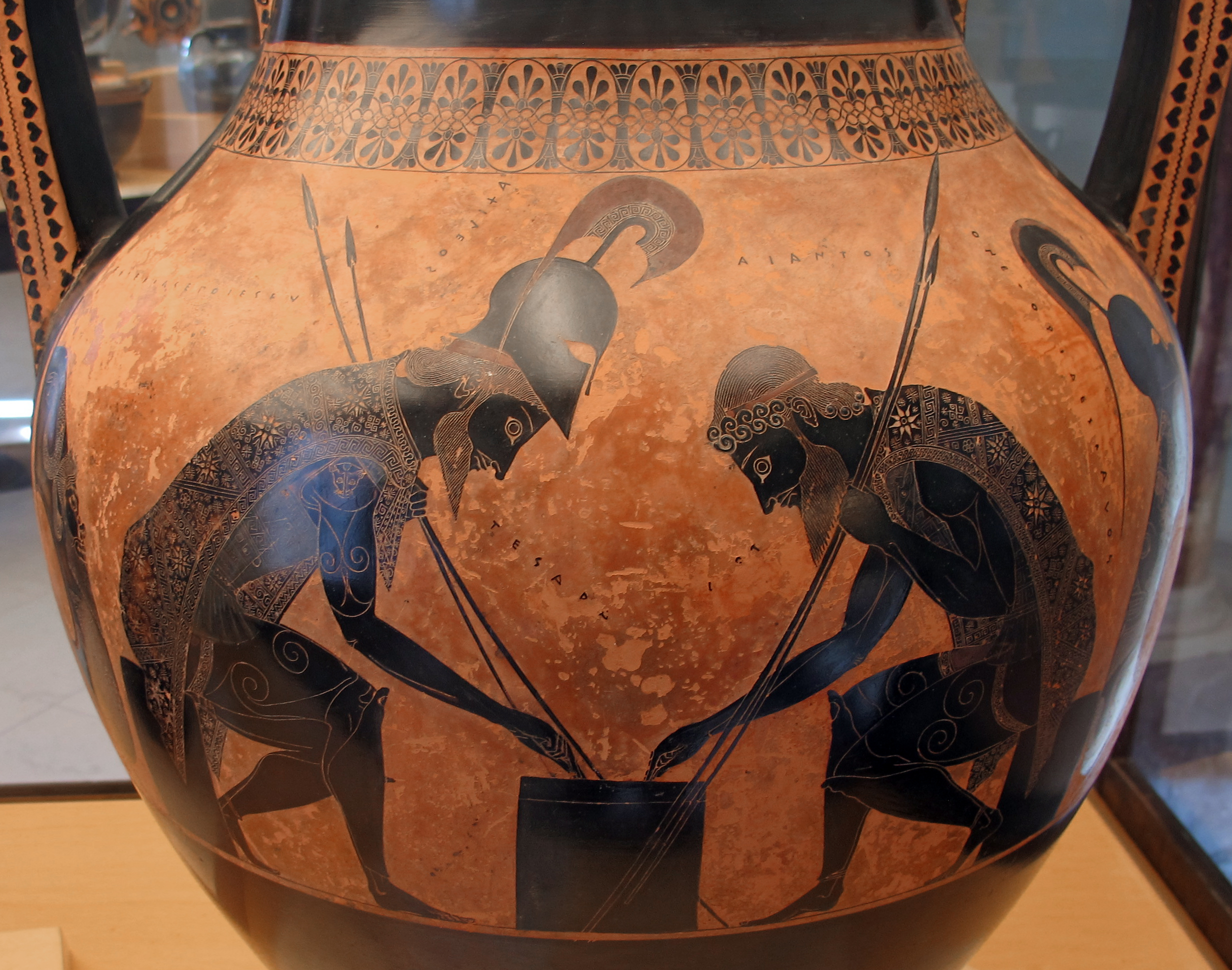
Achilles and Ajax playing a game, often identified as Five Lines; a common theme in Ancient Greek art.

Gameboards, consisting of five parallel lines with circles at the ends, have been found at many sites in ancient Greece, sometimes carved right into the floors of temples. The earliest known examples were found in Anagyros, Attica, and date to the 7th century BCE. Attic vases dated to around 500 BCE show Ajax and Achilles playing the game, with over 160 extant. (Some sources describe the game played in this art as polis, but this is likely a mistake).

The first written mention is by Alcaeus of Mytilene, around 600 BCE. Later, Julius Pollux describes the game in Onomasticon (9.97-98). Pollux writes: "on the five lines from either side there was a middle one called the sacred line. And moving a piece already arrived there gave rise to the proverb 'he moves the piece from the sacred line'." Pollux does not give the game a name, but it is usually called Five Lines by scholars. At this point, the game had likely already stopped being played, since he described it as an element of history.

== Gameplay ==
Two players each move five pieces on a board with five lines, likely counter-clockwise. The winner may have been the first one place their pieces on the central line, called the "sacred line" (sometimes also translated as "holy"). The number of lines does not appear to be strictly limited to five, although this is the most common version; when there are more lines the game is likely played with a corresponding number of pieces. The game is played with dice, though the exact method of advancing the pieces is not known.

Based on project Locus Lundi two different version of the game can be reconstructed. Race game is the first version where knock-off doesn't happen while a second knock-off version includes sending opponent pieces out of board when placing your own on them. The second player has to introduce their piece on the board anew.

Proverbial references to moving a piece from the sacred line occur regularly in Ancient Greek texts. Having all of one's pieces on the sacred line was the goal of the game, so only rarely would a player want to move his pieces from the line "to gain the upper hand," as mentioned, for example, by Alcaeus. Stephen Kidd argues that moving a piece from the holy line was a rare and aggressive move.
