= Courier chess =

Chess variant

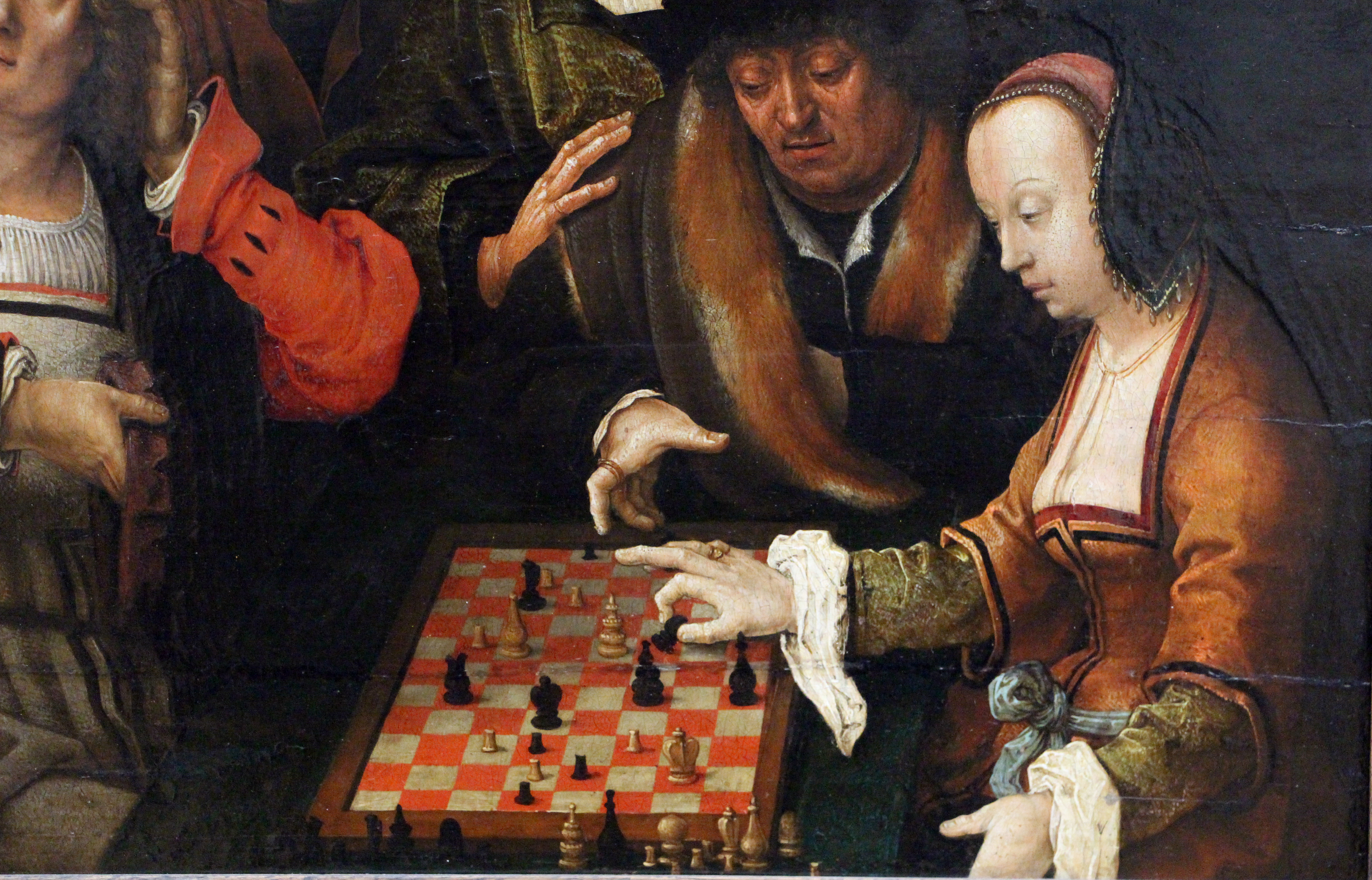
A closeup of the board from Lucas van Leyden's (c. 1520) painting The Chess Players

Courier chess (or courier game, from the German: Läufer-spiel) is a chess variant that dates probably from the 12th century and was popular for at least 600 years. It was a part of the slow evolution towards modern chess from medieval chess.

Courier chess is named after one of its most powerful pieces, the courier or runner (läufer), which moves like the modern bishop. This was a unique move at the time of the game's introduction.

== Medieval rules ==
	a	b	c	d	e	f	g	h	i	j	k	l
8	a8 black rook	b8 black knight	c8 B d	d8 black bishop	e8 black upside-down king	f8 black king	g8	h8 black fool	i8 black bishop	j8 B d	k8 black knight	l8 black rook	8
7	a7	b7 black pawn	c7 black pawn	d7 black pawn	e7 black pawn	f7 black pawn	g7	h7 black pawn	i7 black pawn	j7 black pawn	k7 black pawn	l7	7
6	a6	b6	c6	d6	e6	f6	g6 black queen	h6	i6	j6	k6	l6	6
5	a5 black pawn	b5	c5	d5	e5	f5	g5 black pawn	h5	i5	j5	k5	l5 black pawn	5
4	a4 white pawn	b4	c4	d4	e4	f4	g4 white pawn	h4	i4	j4	k4	l4 white pawn	4
3	a3	b3	c3	d3	e3	f3	g3 white queen	h3	i3	j3	k3	l3	3
2	a2	b2 white pawn	c2 white pawn	d2 white pawn	e2 white pawn	f2 white pawn	g2	h2 white pawn	i2 white pawn	j2 white pawn	k2 white pawn	l2	2
1	a1 white rook	b1 white knight	c1 B l	d1 white bishop	e1 white upside-down king	f1 white king	g1	h1 white fool	i1 white bishop	j1 B l	k1 white knight	l1 white rook	1
	a	b	c	d	e	f	g	h	i	j	k	l

Courier chess position after traditional starting moves (medieval rules)

Courier chess is played on an 8×12 board (i.e., 8 ranks by 12 files). Literary and artistic evidence indicate that the board was always checkered but that there was no consistency as to which squares were light and which squares were dark. The more frequent pattern is that the square at the bottom right corner was light, just as in modern chess. (Note: See The Chess Variant Pages website http://www.chessvariants.org/historic.dir/courier.html. Murray 1913, p. 392 (citing Selenus, Gustavus, Schach- oder Königs-Spiel, Leipzig, 1616) gives the contrary rule.)

The winning objective is the same as Western chess: to checkmate the opponent's king. The stalemate rule is unknown; the subject was unsettled in Germany late into the nineteenth century.

	a	b	c	d	e	f	g	h	i	j	k	l
8	a8 black rook	b8 black knight	c8 B d	d8 black bishop	e8 black upside-down king	f8 black king	g8 black queen	h8 black fool	i8 black bishop	j8 B d	k8 black knight	l8 black rook	8
7	a7 black pawn	b7 black pawn	c7 black pawn	d7 black pawn	e7 black pawn	f7 black pawn	g7 black pawn	h7 black pawn	i7 black pawn	j7 black pawn	k7 black pawn	l7 black pawn	7
6	a6	b6	c6	d6	e6	f6	g6	h6	i6	j6	k6	l6	6
5	a5	b5	c5	d5	e5	f5	g5	h5	i5	j5	k5	l5	5
4	a4	b4	c4	d4	e4	f4	g4	h4	i4	j4	k4	l4	4
3	a3	b3	c3	d3	e3	f3	g3	h3	i3	j3	k3	l3	3
2	a2 white pawn	b2 white pawn	c2 white pawn	d2 white pawn	e2 white pawn	f2 white pawn	g2 white pawn	h2 white pawn	i2 white pawn	j2 white pawn	k2 white pawn	l2 white pawn	2
1	a1 white rook	b1 white knight	c1 B l	d1 white bishop	e1 white upside-down king	f1 white king	g1 white queen	h1 white fool	i1 white bishop	j1 B l	k1 white knight	l1 white rook	1
	a	b	c	d	e	f	g	h	i	j	k	l

The back rank pieces from left to right: (a) rook, (b) knight, (c) bishop, (d) courier, (e) sage, (f) king, (g) queen, (h) schleich, (i) courier, (j) bishop, (k) knight, (l) rook. The second and seventh ranks are filled with pawns.
- King: The kings start on squares of their own color, at f1 and f8. Just as in Western chess, the king may move to any adjoining square, and a player cannot end their turn in check. There is no castling.
- Sage: Next to the king, on e1 and e8, stands the sage or mann, which moves one square in any direction, like the king, but can be hazarded or captured like a normal piece.
- Queen: On the other central file, at g1 and g8, stands the ferz, or queen, which moves one square diagonally.
- Schleich: On the queen's other side, at h1 and h8, stands a piece known as the schleich (or fool, thief, jester, smuggler, spy, or trull) moving one square orthogonally (the move of the wazir).
- Courier: At d1, i1, d8, and i8 stands the piece that gave the game its name: the läufer, or courier, or runner. It moves like the modern chess bishop, any number of squares diagonally.
- Bishop: Next, at c1, j1, c8, and j8, stands the bishop, or archer. It moves as the alfil, two squares diagonally, leaping the first square.
- Knight: At b1, k1, b8, and k8 stands the knight, which moves one square orthogonally, followed by one square diagonally, leaping the squares (the same as the modern chess knight).
- Rook: In the corners, at a1, l1, a8, and l8 stands the rook, which moves any number of squares orthogonally (the same as its modern chess counterpart).
- Pawn: The second rank for each player is filled with pawns, which move like modern chess pawns, one square forward and capture one square diagonally forward. Unlike in modern chess, pawns cannot double advance on their first move. Therefore, the en passant rule does not apply.

Courier chess' pawn promotion rule is that a pawn reaching the furthest rank is promoted to a queen (ferz). However, it is not clear if the promotion happens immediately or if it happens from a more complex promotion process that was used in other contemporary chess variants. The more complex promotion method described by Bell is this: A pawn reaches the 8th rank and becomes immune to capture so long as it stays there. On subsequent moves, the pawn may be moved backwards 2 steps at a time. It may not capture during these moves so the path must be clear. Upon reaching its original starting row (3 backwards 2-step moves) it finally becomes a queen (ferz). The pawn is vulnerable to capture after it makes its first backwards leap. The backwards leaps do not need to be performed on consecutive turns.

The old rule for first moves is that at the start of the game each player must move their rook pawns, their queen pawn, and their queen two squares forward (see top diagram). Such a two-square leap along a file was called a joyleap, and was not available after the starting moves.

== Modern rules ==
=== Albers's Courier-Spiel ===
H. G. Albers attempted to popularize the game in Germany in 1821 with updated rules. The starting setup for Albers' "Courier-Spiel" is the same as for medieval courier chess. The king, queen, courier (with the powers of the modern bishop), knight, and rook have their modern powers. The bishop (or archer) can move one square diagonally, or leap diagonally to the second square. The fool, standing beside the queen, moves one square in any direction. The sage, standing beside the king, combines the powers of the fool and the knight. The pawn moves like the modern pawn, except that after reaching the farthest rank it must remain there for two moves before taking up its new career as a piece.

Castling is permitted, if all squares between the king and the rook are vacant, the king has not been checked, the rook is not en prise, neither has moved, and no square between them is under attack. The king moves to the bishop's square, and the rook leaps over him to the courier's square, in either wing.

The rule on stalemate has not been preserved; the subject was unsettled in Germany well into the nineteenth century.

Subsequent attempts to modernize courier chess include Modern Courier Chess (Paul Byway, starting 1971). An attempt has recently been made to make this game fully compatible with FIDE modern conventions: Reformed Courier-Spiel (Clément Begnis, 2011).

=== Modern Courier Chess ===
Another updated variant of Courier Chess was developed by FIDE Master Paul V. Byway and was described in Variant Chess magazine. Some of the weaker pieces were further enhanced and the starting lineup was reorganized into the following starting position: RNCBFQKFBCNR (this depicts White's starting position).

The pieces move as follows:

- the courier is now just called a bishop and moves like the modern bishop
- the name courier is now used for a piece that can leap in four directions (having the combined powers of alfil and dabbaba)
- the mann now moves like a modern queen
- the fool (schleich) is replaced with another ferz which can also perform a single courier's leap as its first move
- pawns can move twice on the first move

There is no castling, but an unmoved king may take a double step to a vacant square as long as it is not in check and the move consists of two legal single moves.

== History ==
Wirnt von Gravenberg, writing early in the 13th century, mentioned the courier game in his poem Wigalois dating from 1202–1205, and expected his readers to know what he was talking about. Heinrich von Beringen, about a hundred years later, mentioned the introduction of the couriers as an improvement in chess. Kunrat von Ammenhausen, still in the first half of the fourteenth century, told how he had once in Constance seen a game with sixteen more men than in the "right chess": each side having a trull, two couriers, a counsellor, and four extra pawns. He added that he had never seen the game anywhere else, in Provence, France, or Kurwalhen. (Note: Kurwal(c)hen / Churwalchen = historic German name for the Romansh-speaking region around Chur (see also de:Churrätien))

Sometime shortly after 1475, someone put the courier on the standard chessboard in place of the old alfil and gave the queen the combined powers of the courier and the rook. This game was so much more exciting than medieval chess that it soon drove the older game off the market. Other improvements were tried out. One was an optional double first step for the pawns. This was at first restricted to the king's, queen's, and rooks' pawns, and then gradually extended to the others.

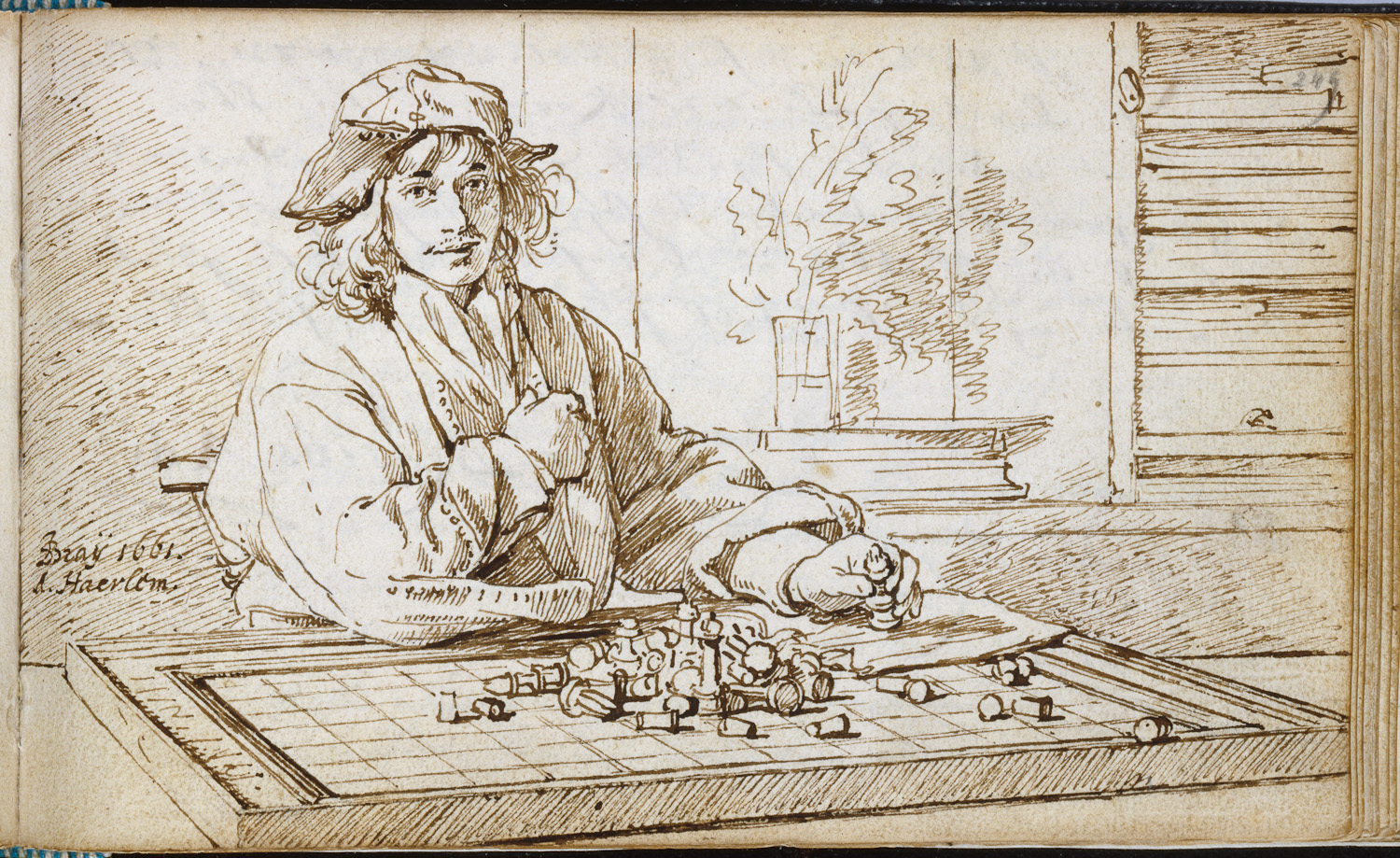
A drawing by Jan de Bray depicting a courier chess set (1661)

In the early sixteenth century, Lucas van Leyden, in the Netherlands, painted a picture called The Chess Players in which a woman appears to be beating a man at courier chess. Gustavus Selenus (Augustus, Duke of Brunswick-Lüneburg) in his 1616 book Das Schach- oder Königs-Spiel, mentioned the Courier Game as one of three forms of chess played in the village of Ströbeck near Halberstadt in Sachsen-Anhalt, Germany. He described it in detail, and gave drawings of the pieces. The names he gave the pieces do not always match the figures in the drawings: the piece called the Schleich is depicted as a court jester.

In 1651, Frederick William, Elector of Brandenburg and Duke of Prussia, gave to Ströbeck a playing board with chess on one side and the courier game on the other, and a set of silver pieces. These pieces were lent in the eighteenth century and never returned, but there is a set of wooden pieces. In 1821 H. G. Albers reported that courier chess was still played in Ströbeck, and that some pieces had gained more powerful moves, but a few years later other visitors found that it had been abandoned. (Note: The Chess Variant Pages website at http://www.chessvariants.org/historic.dir/courierspiel.html mentions H. G. Albers, 1821, and George Hope Verney, Chess Eccentricities, Longmans, Green & Co., London, 1885.) In 1883, the local chess club revived it. Playing sets based on Lucas van Leyden's painting are commercially available.

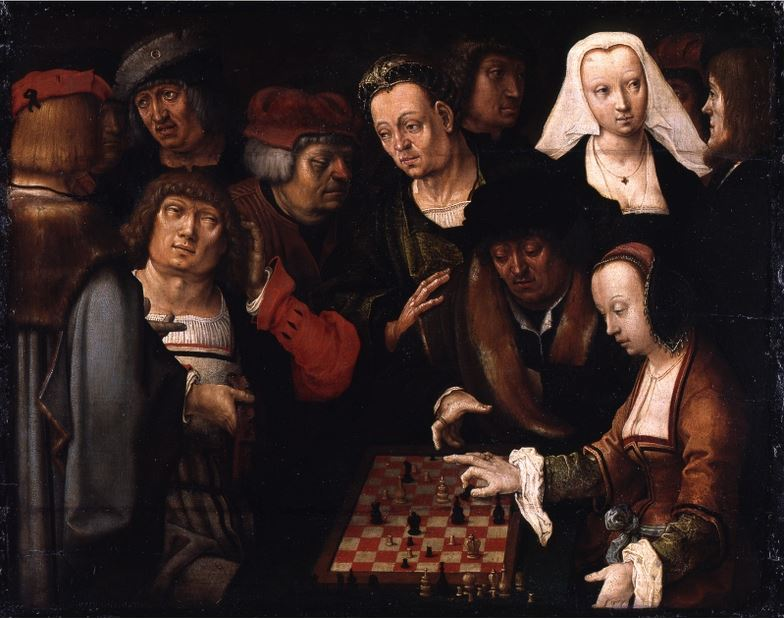
The Chess Players by Lucas van Leyden (c. 1520)

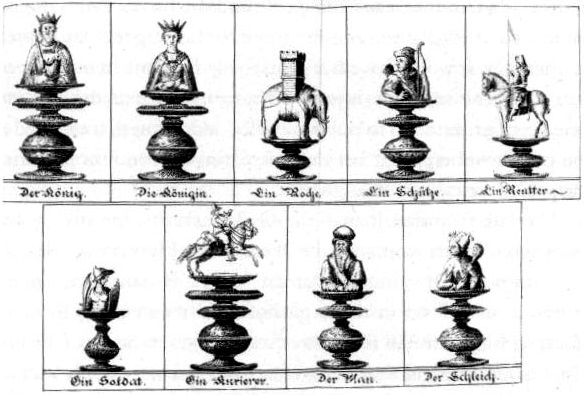
Illustration of courier chess pieces by Gustavus Selenus from the book Das Schach-oder Königs-Spiel (1616). Depicted are the king, queen, rook, archer (or bishop), knight, pawn (or soldier), courier, man (or sage), and jester.

== See also ==
- Fairy chess
- Grant Acedrex
- Tamerlane chess
