= Fidchell =

Ancient Celtic board game

Fidchell / Gwyddbwyll
- Players: 2
- Setup time: 30–60 seconds
- Chance: none
- Age range: 4 years and up
- Medium complexity, highly strategic

Fidchell (Old Irish pronunciation: [ˈfʲiðʲxʲel̪]) or gwyddbwyll (in Welsh, pronounced [ˈɡwɨ̞ðbʊɨ̯ɬ, ˈɡwɪðbʊi̯ɬ]) was a board game popular among the ancient Celts. Fidchell was played between two people who moved an equal number of pieces across a board; the board shared its name with the game played upon it. Based on the descriptions in Irish and Welsh literature as well as archaeological finds of game pieces, it is likely to have been a variant of ludus latrunculorum played in Ireland and Britain.

== Etymology ==
The name of the game in multiple Celtic languages -- Old Irish fidchell, Middle Welsh gỽydbỽyỻ, Breton guidpoill~gwezboell, Cornish gwydhbol—is a compound translating to "wood-wisdom", "wood-intelligence", or "wood-sense". The fact that the compound is identical in each language suggests that it is of extreme antiquity, with the unattested earlier form being reconstructed *widu-kweillā "wood-understanding" in Common Celtic. The game is often compared to or identified with chess, though chess was unknown in Europe until the 12th century. The Old Irish form evolved into ficheall, the word used in modern Irish for modern chess, along with Scottish Gaelic fidhcheall and Manx feeal; the similar gwyddbwyll is the name in Welsh for modern chess.

== History ==
Fidchell or gwyddbwyll is mentioned often in ancient Celtic legends and lore, but the exact form of the game is open to speculation due to lack of detail on the rules, playing pieces, and the board. It is clear that it was played on a board with opposing sets of pieces in equal numbers. It should not be confused with similar games of Norse origin like tawlbwrdd or tafl (also called hnefatafl), which involved a king in the centre and pieces in a 2:1 ratio. Evidence suggests that it may instead have been derived earlier from the Roman game ludus latrunculorum ("game of highwaymen"), which is known to have spread into Germanic and Celtic lands by the early first millennium and is also known from post-Roman Britain. Thus it is possible that fidchell was a descendant of latrunculi. Fidchell shared with latrunculi the method of custodial capture, two around one enemy man on the same line. Archaeological finds such as the Stanway game discovered near Colchester with 13 pieces per side may also represent a British Celtic board game similar or identical to fidchell/gwyddbwyll.

== Gameplay ==
Some details of the gameplay can be deduced from literary mentions in early Irish literature. One text reads:

Fídchell Crimthann Níad Náir.
nis‑beir mac bec día lethláim,
leth a fairni d’or buidi.
in leth aili d’ḟindruine.
oenfer día fairinn namma.
dos‑cicher secht lánamna.

— Amra Colmcille
Translation:

The draughtboard of Crimthann, Nár’s champion,
a small boy carries it not in one hand.
Half of its set of yellow gold,
the other half of white bronze:
one man only of its set
will purchase seven couples (of slaves).

— ed. & trans. Whitley Stokes (1899)

suggesting that fidchell was played by equal forces. The method of custodial capture with two men around one enemy on the same line is also explained in this Middle Irish dialogue, where a cleric plays fidchell all day, refusing to take his opponent's pieces or allow his own to be taken:

‘Maith’, or Guaire, ‘imrem fithchill.’
‘Cinda gontar ind fir?’, or Cummaine.
‘Ni anse, dias dub dam‑sa im óinfer find duid‑seo forsin n‑óintí oc imchosnam na saigti thall.’
‘Mo cubais, immorro,’ or Cummaine, ‘ni cumgaim‑se anaill; acht ni gonab‑sa ni gonfa‑so mo moindter‑sa.’
Laa chaidcht do Guaire oca thetarracht ⁊ ni ruba fer dia muinter.
‘Segonda sein, a clerich,’ or Guaire.

— Mac Dá Cherda and Cummaine Foda
Translation:

‘Good,’ says Guaire, ‘let us play chess.’
‘How are the men taken?’ says Cummaine.
‘Not difficult to say; a black pair of mine about one white man of yours on the same line (?) disputing the attack from the other side.’ (?)
‘My conscience!’ said Cummaine, ‘I cannot do either; I shall not slay (your men), you will not slay my men.’
For a whole day Guaire was attacking him and he could not slay one of his men.
‘That is champion-like, O cleric,’ said Guaire.

— ed. & trans. J. G. O'Keefe (1911)

Unlike latrunculi with its usual pebble-shaped counters, however, conical pieces may also have been innovated among the Insular Celts, as stone cones for gaming have been found in sites at Shetland, Scotland and Knowth, Ireland. This is also suggested by Irish legends such as the Echtra Nerai where fidchell pieces become lodged in a skull during a fight:

Doneco Fergus seco la soduin ocus bentoi sethnu a chinn do Briccriu cona durn co lotur na cuicfir fichilli batar hind-dum Ferguso hi cenn m-Briccriunn, co m-bo buan d'olcc do.

— Echtra Nerai
Translation:

On that Fergus glanced aside and struck with his fist at Bricriu's head, so that the five men of fidchell that were in his hand went into Bricriu's head, and it was a lasting hurt to him.

— ed. & trans. Kuno Meyer

The legends describe fidchell as a game played by royalty and by gods. In legend, it was invented by Lugh, god of light and inspiration, and was played skilfully by his son, the hero Cú Chulainn. A series of fidchell games form an important episode in the story Tochmarc Étaíne.

Lavish, sometimes mystical gwyddbwyll boards appear often in medieval Welsh literature. In The Dream of Rhonabwy, a prose tale associated with the Mabinogion, King Arthur and Owain mab Urien play the game with golden men on a silver board. In another prose tale, The Dream of Macsen Wledig, the character Eudaf Hen is carving men for his golden board when he is visited by the emperor Magnus Maximus. The board of Gwenddoleu ap Ceidio is named as one of the Thirteen Treasures of the Island of Britain in lists dating from the 15th and 16th centuries; according to the lists the board is gold and the men silver, and the pieces play against each other automatically. A magic gwyddbwyll comparable to Gwenddoleu's appears in the Arthurian romance Peredur son of Efrawg; a number of French versions of the Holy Grail story feature similar chessboards with self-moving pieces, following the Second Continuation of Chrétien de Troyes's Perceval, the Story of the Grail, though in these only one side moves, while the hero plays the other.

According to H. J. R. Murray's A History of Chess, the ultimate fate of Fidchell is shown a margin note upon one 15th-century manuscript about the Second Battle of Magh Tuireadh between the Tuatha Dé Danann and the Fomorians in Irish mythology. In the gloss, it is disputed whether Fidchell ("chess") could have been invented during the Trojan War, as both wars were traditionally believed to have taken place at roughly the same time and the Irish mythology manuscript refers to the playing of fidchell. While it is no longer possible to know whether it was introduced into Gaelic Ireland by the Hiberno-Norse or the Normans, by the 15th-century "Fidchell" had come to mean Chess in the Irish language and the original rules of the game had been completely forgotten.

== Confusion with tafl ==
In the board games literature, it has often been suggested that fidchell is a variant of the Welsh game tawlbwrdd, itself descended from the Norse tafl games. These games, along with the Irish brandubh, are played on a grid, often seven squares by seven, with the king in the middle. The king has a number of defending pieces around it at the beginning of the game, and they are surrounded by twice as many attackers. The object is to make a clear path for the king to the edge of the board, while the attackers must attempt to surround, and thereby capture, the king. However, tafl variants are usually played with unequal numbers of pieces, the attackers being twice as numerous as the defenders. Fidchell by contrast was played with equal numbers on both sides and there is no indication of a king piece.

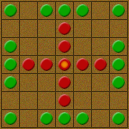
Layout for a tafl game known as fitchneal or fidchell, which is not equivalent to historical fidchell and gwyddbwyll

An artefact found in Ballinderry, County Westmeath in 1932, known as the Ballinderry Game Board, has been suggested to represent fidchell. This is a wooden board with Celtic symbols on it, with a seven-by-seven grid, marked off by 49 holes. This artefact may be a tafl variant, and perhaps even a brandubh board; many commentators assume that it is the type of board upon which one would have played fidchell. Based on the assumption that the Ballinderry board represented fidchell, some recent tafl board reconstructions and apps have given the name of "fitchneal" to a particular 7x7 tafl arrangement (see image), which has extended the confusion.

Historically, tafl games, especially tawlbwrdd, were often played with a die, made of a sheep's knucklebone, and this feature seems absent in fidchell. In Wales, a clear distinction is made between tawlbwrdd and gwyddbwyll, which, if also true of Ireland, would tend to indicate a similar distinction between brandubh and fidchell.

== Historical impact ==
Fidchell, as described in the legends, often has a mystical or divinatory aspect to it. Battles ebb and flow as a result of the ebb and flow of a game of fidchell, games play themselves, great events are decided on the outcome of a fidchell match. This supernatural aspect is not as clearly reflected in the tafl games.

There is clear archaeological and textual evidence that a tafl variant was played in Ireland in ancient times; however, this is more likely to have been the game of brandubh, which had a king piece. Fidchell was played with equal forces, and so was not a form of tafl.

== See also ==
- Tafl games
- Druid of Colchester

== Bibliography ==
- Bayless, Martha (2005). "Alea, Tæfl, and related games: Vocabulary and context". In O'Keeffe, Katherine O'Brien; Orchard, Andy (eds.). Latin Learning and English Lore. Scholarly Publishing Division. Vol. II. University of Toronto Press. pp. 9–27. ISBN 0802089194.
- Bromwich, Rachel (2006). Trioedd Ynys Prydein [The Triads of the Island of Britain] (in Welsh). University of Wales Press. ISBN 0708313868.
- Nugent, Brian (2010). The Irish Invented Chess. Lulu.com. ISBN 978-0955681264.
- Early Irish Myths and Sagas. Translated by Gantz, Jeffrey (reprint ed.). Marboro Books. 1986. ISBN 0880290382.
- Pennick, Nigel (1989). Secret Games of the Gods: Ancient ritual systems in board games. S. Weiser.
- Rees, Alwyn; Rees, Brinley (1961). Celtic Heritage. UK: Thames and Hudson.
- Tolstoy, Nikolai (1985). The Quest for Merlin. Little, Brown. ISBN 0316850667.
