= Locus Ludi =

2017–2022 research project

Locus Ludi is a five-year 2017-2022 research project on play and games in Graeco-Roman Antiquity sponsored and financed by the European Research Council (ERC) under the European Union's Horizon 2020 research and innovation programme. The project is headed by Professor of Classical Studies Véronique Dasen, University of Fribourg, Switzerland.

== Project Summary ==
The goal of project is to study the historical and anthropological dimension of games and toys in Antiquity. A team of researchers has been put in place in order to search all available primary sources such as literature, archaeological, and iconographic material relating to games and toys in antiquity. It is the first time this field is researched by a multidisciplinary team in Europe.

The project is based at the University of Fribourg, Switzerland, in the faculty of Art and Archaeology in Classical Antiquity. Conferences and expositions are organised with the cooperation of European museums, such as Swiss Museum of Games at La Tour-de-Peilz, Switzerland, and Gallo-Roman Museum of Lyon-Fourvière, France.

The way people play evolves over time and this project intends to provide a point of reference by reconstructing this history in Ancient Greece, from the birth of the city-state, c. 800 BCE, to the Roman conquest in 146 BCE, and in the Ancient Roman world from the Republican age, c. 500 BCE, to the end of the Western Roman Empire, c. 500 CE.

== Resources ==
- 'Locus Ludi: The Cultural Fabric of Play and Games in Classical Antiquity' European Research Council (Retrieved 11 November 2019)
- Dasen V., Schädler U. (éd.), dossier « Jouer dans l’Antiquité. Identité et multiculturalité », Archimède. Archéologie et histoire ancienne, 6, 2019.
- Faculty of Art and Archaeology in Classical Antiquity of Fribourg, Switzerland
