= Francesc Vicent =

Spanish chess player

Francesco Vicent
- Born: 1450; Segorbe, Kingdom of Valencia
- Died: c. 1512 (aged 61–62); Unknown
- Occupation: Chess author

Francesc Vicent (1450 in Segorbe – c. 1512) was a Valencian author who wrote the first treatise about chess using the present-day moves for the queen and the bishop. Libre dels jochs partits dels schacs en nombre de 100 was printed in Valencia on May 15, 1495, by Lope de Roca Alemany and Pere Trincher. No copy of this work has survived, though it is likely that some of its contents survive in translation (from Catalan to Castilian) in the Repetición de amores y arte de acedrex of Luis Ramírez de Lucena. Vicent may also be the true author of the treatise Questo libro e da imparare giocare a scachi signed by Pedro Damiano. It is assumed that the book contained 100 endgames. The original Catalan work was still known to Alessandro Salvio in Naples in the early 17th century. It is believed that there was a copy in the library of Santa Maria de Montserrat, but this was destroyed by the occupying French forces in 1811 during the Peninsular War.

Vicent is considered the founder of modern chess. As his work spread throughout Europe, the innovation of the queen's change in movement making it the most powerful chess piece appeared for the first time in the poem Scachs d'amor (1475) written by Bernat Fenollar, Narcís Vinyoles and Franci de Castellví. This has been presented as evidence that the modern queen's move is a Spanish invention.

The asteroid 78071 Vicent, discovered in 2002, is named after him.
