= Chess in Europe =

Historical article

The game of chess, or rather its immediate precursor, known as shatranj, was introduced to Europe from the Islamic sphere, most likely via Iberia (modern Spain), in the 9th or 10th century (possibly as early as at the beginning of the 9th century, and certainly by the mid to late 10th century).

The earliest reference to the game in Middle Latin is a poem de scachis, preserved in Einsiedeln Abbey. Chess in medieval Europe was played in monasteries and at feudal courts. An exception is Ströbeck, known as the "chess village", where chess became popular among the farmers in the early 11th century already.

== Modern chess in the UK ==
England, Scotland, Ireland, Wales, Jersey and Guernsey all have separate national chess federations, and send their own teams to international chess competitions. The English Chess Federation, which in 2005 replaced the long established British Chess Federation, is responsible for the organisation of chess in England, and also organises the annual British Chess Championship on behalf of all the UK federations. Tournament organisers and chess clubs send game results and appropriate fees to the ECF which then compiles ratings that measure the playing strength of active players.

The basis of English (ECF) ratings broadly speaking is that the difference in ratings is half the difference in percentage scores. That is, if player A beats player B in a match 8 to 2 (60% difference), you would expect his grade to be about 30 points higher. Grades are calculated by averaging out points gained or lost against opponents whose grades are known already. There are two sets of grades, one for rapidplay games (30 minutes each per game), the other for standard games (two minutes or more average per move).

In addition to games within the club, there are leagues in which clubs compete with each other and these games will also be graded. Aside from the many local leagues, the Four Nations Chess League (4NCL) is effectively a prestigious tournament run on a league format, to which many of the British and world's elite players are attracted.

The most famous tournament held in Britain is probably the Hastings International Chess Congress, which runs from late December to early January.

Tournaments usually pay prizes both for the first three or four places and for people who get the most points within a particular range of grades, but the vast majority of players who enter them play for recreation.

== See also ==
- Chess in early literature
- Lewis chessmen
- Chess in Armenia
- Chess in Spain
