= Damiano Defence =

Position: a8 black rook, b8 black knight, c8 black bishop, d8 black queen, e8 black king, f8 black bishop, g8 black knight, h8 black rook, a7 black pawn, b7 black pawn, c7 black pawn, d7 black pawn, g7 black pawn, h7 black pawn, f6 black pawn, e5 black pawn, e4 white pawn, f3 white knight, a2 white pawn, b2 white pawn, c2 white pawn, d2 white pawn, f2 white pawn, g2 white pawn, h2 white pawn, a1 white rook, b1 white knight, c1 white bishop, d1 white queen, e1 white king, f1 white bishop, h1 white rook
- Moves: 1.e4 e5 2.Nf3 f6
- ECO: C40
- Named after: Pedro Damiano
- Parent: King's Knight Opening

The Damiano Defence is a chess opening beginning with the moves:

1. e4 e5
2. Nf3 f6?

The defence is one of the oldest chess openings, with games dating back to the 16th century. It is a weak opening that gives a large advantage for White after 3.Nxe5. Even if White does not go for this continuation, simple development leads to an advantage since 2...f6 prevents the g8-knight from developing to f6 and weakens Black's kingside.

The Encyclopaedia of Chess Openings code for the Damiano Defence is C40 (King's Knight Opening).

== History ==
Schiffers vs. Chigorin, 1897

Position: a8 black rook, e8 black king, f8 black bishop, g8 black knight, h8 black rook, a7 black pawn, b7 black pawn, c7 black pawn, d7 black bishop, g7 black pawn, h7 black pawn, c6 black knight, f6 black pawn, g6 black queen, e5 white knight, c3 white knight, a2 white pawn, b2 white pawn, c2 white pawn, e2 white bishop, f2 white pawn, g2 white pawn, h2 white pawn, a1 white rook, c1 white bishop, d1 white queen, f1 white rook, g1 white king

Position after 10.Ne5!, White wins Black's queen. If the knight is captured, 11.Bh5 pins the queen to the king, while 10...Qf5 leads to 11.Bg4 and the queen is trapped (11...Qxe5 12.Qxd7#).

The opening is named after the Portuguese chess author Pedro Damiano (1480–1544), despite the fact that he condemned it as weak and the book may actually be Francesc Vicent's writing that he signed. In 1847, Howard Staunton wrote of 2...f6, "This move occurs in the old work of Damiano, who gives some ingenious variations on it. Lopez, and later authors, have hence entitled it 'Damiano's Gambit'." Instead, Staunton's contemporary George Walker more logically reserved the term "Damiano Gambit" for the knight sacrifice played by White on the third move: 1.e4 e5 2.Nf3 f6 3.Nxe5. Staunton referred to [1.e4 e5 2.Nf3] 2...Nc6, a highly respected move then and now, as "Damiano's defence to the K. Kt.'s opening".

The Damiano Defence is never seen today in top-level play. The greatest player to play the Damiano in serious master competition was Mikhail Chigorin. As noted above, he played the 3...Qe7 line in a game against Schiffers at St. Petersburg 1897. Chigorin lost his queen on move 10 (see diagram), but Schiffers played so weakly that Chigorin later missed a brilliant forced mate and only escaped when Schiffers agreed to a draw in a winning position. Robert McGregor played the Damiano in a 1964 simultaneous exhibition against Bobby Fischer, essaying 3...Qe7 4.Nf3 d5 5.d3 dxe4 6.dxe4 Qxe4+ 7.Be2 Bf5, and drew, although Fischer did not play the best moves.

== White responses ==
=== 3.d4 and 3.Bc4 ===
Black's 2...f6? is a weak move that exposes Black's king, weakens their kingside and prevents Black from developing their knight to f6. The moves 3.d4 and 3.Bc4 are strong replies; I. A. Horowitz wrote (substituting algebraic notation for his descriptive notation), "Simple and potent is 3.Bc4 d6 4.d4 Nc6 5.c3, after which Black chokes to death."

=== 3.Nxe5! ===
Position: a8 black rook, b8 black knight, c8 black bishop, d8 black queen, f8 black bishop, g8 black knight, h8 black rook, a7 black pawn, b7 black pawn, c7 black pawn, g7 black pawn, g6 black king, d5 white bishop, e5 white queen, h5 black pawn, e4 white pawn, h4 white pawn, a2 white pawn, b2 white pawn, c2 white pawn, d2 white pawn, f2 white pawn, g2 white pawn, a1 white rook, b1 white knight, c1 white bishop, e1 white king, h1 white rook

Position after 8...h5

The most forceful move is the knight sacrifice 3.Nxe5! Taking the knight with 3...fxe5? exposes Black to a deadly attack after 4.Qh5+ Ke7 (4...g6 loses to 5.Qxe5+, forking king and rook, leaving Black down the exchange, though other options are worse) 5.Qxe5+ Kf7 6.Bc4+ d5! (6...Kg6?? 7.Qf5+ is devastating and leads to mate shortly after) 7.Bxd5+ Kg6 8.h4 (8.d4? Bd6!) 8...h5 (diagram; 8...h6 is similar, except Black cannot play 9...Bxb7 because of 10.Qf5#) 9.Bxb7! Bd6 (9...Bxb7 10.Qf5+ Kh6 11.d4+ g5 12.Qf7! mates quickly) 10.Qa5!, when Black's best is 10...Nc6 11.Bxc6 Rb8, and now White can play 12.Qxa7 with five extra pawns. Bruce Pandolfini notes that Black's opening is thus sometimes described as "the five pawns gambit". Alternatively, White can continue developing their pieces, remaining four pawns up. In either case, White has a clearly winning position.

Since taking the knight is fatal, after 3.Nxe5 Black should instead play 3...Qe7! (Other Black third moves, such as 3...d5, lead to 4. Qh5+! g6 5. Nxg6!) After 4.Nf3 (4.Qh5+? g6 5.Nxg6 Qxe4+ 6.Be2 Qxg6 leaves Black ahead a piece for a pawn) 4...Qxe4+ 5.Be2, Black has regained the pawn but has lost time and weakened their kingside, and will lose more time when White chases the queen with Nc3, or 0-0, Re1, and a move by the bishop on e2. Nick de Firmian in Modern Chess Openings analyses instead 4...d5 5.d3 dxe4 6.dxe4, when White had a small advantage in Emmanuel Schiffers–Mikhail Chigorin, St. Petersburg 1897.

The fact that Black can only regain the pawn with 3...Qe7! shows that 2...f6? did not really defend the e-pawn at all. Indeed, even a relatively useless move like 2...a6?! is less risky than 2...f6? After 2...a6?! 3.Nxe5, Black could still regain the pawn with 3...Qe7 4.d4 d6, but has not weakened the kingside or prevented the king's knight from developing to f6.
