= Pytel =

Pytel (Cyrillic: Питeль) is a Polish/Ukrainian surname. Notable people with the surname include:

- Daniel Pytel, Polish speedway rider
- Walenty Pytel, Polish born contemporary artist based in Britain
- Krzysztof Pytel, Polish chess player
- Gergő Pytel, Hungarian badminton player
- Jamie Pytel, Canada litigation lawyer
