= Scandinavian Defense =

Chess opening

Position: a8 black rook, b8 black knight, c8 black bishop, d8 black queen, e8 black king, f8 black bishop, g8 black knight, h8 black rook, a7 black pawn, b7 black pawn, c7 black pawn, e7 black pawn, f7 black pawn, g7 black pawn, h7 black pawn, d5 black pawn, e4 white pawn, a2 white pawn, b2 white pawn, c2 white pawn, d2 white pawn, f2 white pawn, g2 white pawn, h2 white pawn, a1 white rook, b1 white knight, c1 white bishop, d1 white queen, e1 white king, f1 white bishop, g1 white knight, h1 white rook
- Moves: 1.e4 d5
- ECO: B01
- Origin: Castellvi vs. Vinyoles, Valencia 1475
- Named after: Scandinavia
- Parent: King's Pawn Game
- Synonyms: Center Counter Defense; Center Counter Game

The Scandinavian Defense (or Center Counter Defense, or Center Counter Game) is a chess opening beginning with the moves:

1. e4 d5

This opening was featured in the first documented chess game with the modern queen and bishop moves, in the 15th century Catalan poem Scachs d'amor. The goal of the Scandinavian is to prevent White from controlling the center of the board with pawns, effectively forcing an open game.

After 2.exd5 there are two main branches, the more "positional" 2...Qxd5 and the more "tactical" 2...Nf6. After 2...Qxd5 3.Nc3 Black must spend another tempo moving the queen; the main options are 3...Qa5, 3...Qd6, and 3...Qd8. In the Encyclopedia of Chess Openings, all lines of the Scandinavian are covered by the single code B01.

== History ==
=== Origin ===
The Scandinavian Defense is arguably the oldest recorded opening, being depicted in a fictional game played in Valencia between Francesc de Castellví and Narcís Vinyoles in the Catalan poem Scachs d'amor, written around 1475. This may well be the earliest documented game of chess with the modern queen and bishop moves. It was also included in Lucena's 1497 book Repetition of Love and the Art of Playing Chess with 150 Games.

=== 19th and early 20th centuries ===
Analysis by Scandinavian masters in the late 19th century showed it is playable for Black; Ludvig Collijn played the opening with success. Although the Scandinavian Defense has never enjoyed widespread popularity among top-flight players, Joseph Henry Blackburne and Jacques Mieses often played it, and greatly developed its theory in the late 19th and early 20th centuries. It was an occasional choice in this era for top players including Siegbert Tarrasch, Rudolph Spielmann, and Savielly Tartakower. Alexander Alekhine used it to draw against World Champion Emanuel Lasker at St. Petersburg 1914, and future World Champion José Raúl Capablanca won twice with it at New York 1915.

=== Modern era ===
A regular user from the 1950s onwards was Yugoslav International Master (IM) Nikola Karaklajić. A lengthy period of non-support by top players ended by the 1960s, when former world championship finalist David Bronstein and women's world champion Nona Gaprindashvili played it occasionally. Danish grandmaster (GM) Bent Larsen, a four-time world championship candidate, played it occasionally from the 1960s onwards; he defeated World Champion Anatoly Karpov with it at Montreal 1979, spurring a rise in popularity. The popular name also began to switch from "Center Counter Defense" to "Scandinavian Defense" around this time, in acknowledgement of Collijn's role in rehabilitating the opening. Danish GM Curt Hansen is also considered an expert in the opening. Australian GM Ian Rogers has adopted it frequently starting in the 1980s. In 1995, the Scandinavian Defense made its first appearance in a world chess championship match, in the 14th game of the PCA final at New York City. Viswanathan Anand as Black obtained an excellent position using the opening against Garry Kasparov, although Kasparov won the game.

During the sixth round of the 2014 Chess Olympiad at Tromsø, Magnus Carlsen chose the Scandinavian against Fabiano Caruana, and won; Carlsen used the opening again to draw with Caruana at the 2016 Chess Olympiad at Baku. Carlsen used the opening as Black in a blitz game to defeat Viswanathan Anand at the 2019 Grand Chess Tour stop in Kolkata.

== 2.exd5 Qxd5 3.Nc3 ==
After 2.exd5, the first major option in the Scandinavian is to immediately recapture the pawn with the queen (2...Qxd5). Black hopes for a free game with easy development, but at the cost of a tempo. After 3.Nc3, Black has three main choices: 3...Qa5, 3...Qd8, and 3...Qd6. The most common is 3...Qa5, after which White's main options are 4.d4, 4.Nf3, 4.Bc4, and 4.g3. Another possibility is 4.b4, the Kotrč–Mieses Gambit, but this is considered dubious against a prepared opponent.

=== 3...Qa5 ===
3...Qa5 is considered the main line and remains the most popular option. White can choose from multiple setups. 4.d4, 4.Nf3, and 4.Bc4 often transpose to the same line.

==== Main line ====
The main line after 3...Qa5 continues 4.d4 c6 5.Nf3 Nf6 6.Bc4 Bf5 7.Bd2 e6, also frequently reached by other move orders. White has a few options, such as the aggressive 8.Qe2, or the quiet 8.0-0. Black's pawn structure (pawns on e6 and c6) resemble a Caro–Kann Defense structure, therefore many Caro–Kann players wishing to expand their repertoire have adopted this form of the Scandinavian. An unusual feature of the main line Scandinavian is that both players have the option of castling on either side of the board.

==== Fianchetto line: 4.g3 ====
4.g3 targets Black's pawn on b7 by fianchettoing the bishop on the h1–a8 diagonal. The main line after 4.g3 continues 4...Nf6 5.Bg2 c6 6.Nf3, intending 0-0, Rb1, and to exploit the b7-pawn by b4–b5. The line with 4.g3 has been tried by Anand, Baadur Jobava, Gyula Sax, and Francisco Vallejo Pons among others.

==== Kotrč–Mieses Gambit: 4.b4!? ====
A more speculative approach against 3...Qa5 is 4.b4!?. In the 7th edition of Modern Chess Openings published in 1946, editor Walter Korn, a native of Prague, attributes the move to the Czech master, problemist and chess magazine editor Jan Kotrč, though there is no record of Kotrč ever playing it. In subsequent editions of MCO it was called the Kotrč–Mieses Gambit. It is also called the Leonhardt Gambit after its introduction to master play by Paul Saladin Leonhardt against Jacques Mieses in 1907. Players who have ventured this line as White include Lasker, Capablanca, and Paul Keres.

If Black plays correctly, White should not have sufficient compensation for the sacrificed pawn, but it can be difficult to prove this over the board. British GM Nigel Davies suggests delaying the gambit with 4.Nf3 Nf6 5.b4 Qxb4 6.a4!?, with the idea of Bc1–a3, as a possible way to rehabilitate this line.

=== 3...Qd8 ===
The retreat with 3...Qd8 was depicted in the 15th century Catalan poem Scachs d'amor. In reference to this, authors Sergi Núñez de Arenas and Francisco Rubio proposed the name "Valencian Variation" in a 2023 article for the Spanish magazine Peón de Rey. Prior to the 20th century, it was often considered the main line, and was characterized as "best" by Howard Staunton in his Chess-Player's Handbook, but was gradually superseded by 3...Qa5. In the 1960s, 3...Qd8 experienced something of a revival after the move was played in a game by Bronstein against GM Andrija Fuderer in 1959, although Bronstein ultimately lost the game. Bronstein's game featured the older line 4.d4 Nf6, while other grandmasters, including Karl Robatsch, explored fianchetto systems with 4.d4 g6 and a later ...Ng8–h6.

The 3...Qd8 line's reputation suffered after a string of defeats however, including two well-known miniatures won by Bobby Fischer against Robatsch in the 1962 Chess Olympiad (later published in My 60 Memorable Games) and William Addison in 1970. The variation with 4...g6 "has been under a cloud ever since [Fischer's] crushing win", but the 3...Qd8 variation as a whole remains playable, although it is considered somewhat passive. It is played particularly by IMs John Bartholomew and Daniel Lowinger, and by the GMs David Garcia Ilundain and Nikola Djukić.

=== 3...Qd6 ===
3...Qd6, which has been called the Gubinsky–Melts Defense and the Pytel Variation (after Krzysztof Pytel and Bożena Pytel), has grown in popularity over time. At first sight the move seems to leave the queen vulnerable to a later Nb5 or Bf4, and for many years it was poorly regarded for this reason. Numerous grandmaster games have since shown 3...Qd6 to be quite playable, however, being played many times in high-level chess since the mid-1990s. White players against this line have found an effective setup with d4, Nf3, g3, Bg2, 0-0, and a future Ne5 with a strong, active position. The variation was covered thoroughly in a 2001 book by Michael Melts.

=== Black's third-move alternatives ===
Other queen moves by Black are considered inferior.

- 3...Qe5+?! 4.Be2 c6 (or 4...Bg4 5.d4 Bxe2 6.Nxe2) 5.Nf3 Qc7 6.d4 gives White a handy lead in development. British IM Andrew Martin has dubbed this the "Patzer Variation" (from the phrase "patzer sees a check, gives a check"); however, he considers it playable and underrated.
- 3...Qe6+?! is sometimes played with the idea of 4.Be2 Qg6? (4...g6 is better), attacking White's g2 pawn; however, after 5.Nf3 Qxg2 6.Rg1 Qh3 7.d4, White's massive lead in development far outweighs Black's extra pawn. In 1990, David Letterman played this line as Black in a televised game against Garry Kasparov; he was checkmated in 23 moves.

=== Alternatives to 3.Nc3 ===
Alternatives to 3.Nc3 include 3.d4, which can transpose into a variation of the Nimzowitsch Defense after 3...Nc6 (1.e4 Nc6 2.d4 d5 3.exd5 Qxd5), or Black can play 3...e5, as well. After 3...Nc6 4.Nf3 Bg4 5.Be2 0-0-0 Black has better development to compensate for White's center after a future c4. Black may also respond to 3.d4 with 3...e5. After the usual 4.dxe5, Black most often plays the pawn sacrifice 4...Qxd1+ 5.Kxd1 Nc6. After White defends the pawn, Black follows up with ...Bg4+ and ...0-0-0, e.g. 6.Bb5 Bg4+ 7.f3 0-0-0+ and Black has enough compensation for the pawn, because he is better developed and White's king is stuck in the center. Less popular is 4...Qxe5, since the queen has moved twice in the opening and is in the center of the board, where White can attack it with gain of time (Nf3). Grandmasters such as Sergei Tiviakov have shown, however, that it is not so easy to exploit the centralized queen.

Another possibility is the noncommittal 3.Nf3. After 3...Bg4 4.Be2 Nc6, White can transpose to main lines with 5.d4, but has other options, such as 5.0-0.

== Modern Scandinavian: 2...Nf6 ==
2...Nf6 represents the other main branch of the Scandinavian Defense. The idea is to delay recapturing the pawn on d5 and instead recapture with the knight on a later move, avoiding the loss of tempo that Black suffers in the ...Qxd5 lines. White can attempt to hang on to the pawn by playing c4, but more often simply continues with development, delaying c2–c4 or omitting it altogether.

=== Main line: 3.d4 ===
GM John Emms calls 3.d4 the main line of the 2...Nf6 variations, saying that "3.d4 is the common choice for White...and it is easy to see why it is so popular." The idea of the move is to allow Black to recapture the pawn while focusing on quick development. 3...Nxd5 is the most obvious reply, although 3...Qxd5 is occasionally seen. 3...Bg4, the Portuguese Variation, is a sharp line that further delays recapturing.

==== 3...Nxd5 ====
After 3...Nxd5, Black wins back the pawn, but White can respond with 4.c4, forcing the knight to move. The most common responses are:

- 4...Nb6, named by Ron Harman and IM Shaun Taulbut as the most active option.
- 4...Nf6, which Emms calls "slightly unusual, but certainly possible". GM Savielly Tartakower, an aficionado of unusual openings, discussing Black's options, stated "the soundest is 4...Nf6." This is sometimes called the Marshall Retreat Variation.
- 4...Nb4!?, the tricky Kiel Variation, described by Harman and Taulbut as "a speculative try". Black is hoping for 5.Qa4+ N8c6 6.d5? b5! with a good game; however, White gets a large advantage after 5.a3 N4c6 6.d5 Ne5 7.Nf3 (or 7.f4 Ng6 8.Bd3 e5 9.Qe2) or 5.Qa4+ N8c6 6.a3!, so the Kiel Variation is rarely seen in practice.

White may also play 4.Nf3 Bg4 5.c4. Now 5...Nb6 6.c5!? is a sharp line; Black should respond 6...N6d7!, rather than 6...Nd5? 7.Qb3, when Black resigned after 7...b6? 8.Ne5! in Timman–Bakkali, Nice Olympiad 1974, and 7...Bxf3 8.Qxb7! Ne3 9.Qxf3 Nc2+ 10.Kd1 Nxa1 11.Qxa8 also wins for White.

==== Portuguese Variation: 3...Bg4!? ====
An important and recently popular alternative to 3...Nxd5 is 3...Bg4!?, the sharp Portuguese Variation. In this line, Black delays recapturing the pawn and instead focuses on rapid development. The resulting sharp play is often similar to the Icelandic Gambit. The normal continuation is 4.f3 Bf5 5.Bb5+ Nbd7 6.c4.

==== Other lines ====
- 3...Qxd5 can transpose to the classical line with 2...Qxd5 after 3.Nc3, but White can avoid this, such as with 4.Nf3 or 4.c4.
- 3...c6 can transpose to the 3.c4 c6 line below if White plays 4.c4, or play might proceed similarly to the Blackburne–Kloosterboer Gambit (2...c6) after 3.dxc6 Nxc6.
- 3...g6, the Richter Variation, is a rare move which was played on occasion by IM Kurt Richter in the 1930s.

=== 3.c4 ===
Another common response is 3.c4, with which White attempts to retain the extra pawn, at the cost of the inactivity of the light-square bishop. Now Black can play 3...c6, the Scandinavian Gambit, which is the most common move. The line 4.dxc6? Nxc6, described by Emms as "a miserly pawn grab", gives Black too much central control and development. Furthermore, after 4.dxc6 Black can play 4...e5, the Ross Gambit, which after 5.cxb7 Bxb7 resembles a reversed Danish Gambit. Most common after 3...c6 is 4.d4 cxd5, transposing to the Panov–Botvinnik Attack of the Caro–Kann Defense.

==== Icelandic Gambit: 3...e6!? ====
3...e6!? is the sharp Icelandic Gambit or Palme Gambit, invented by Icelandic masters who looked for an alternative to the more common 3...c6. Black sacrifices a pawn to achieve rapid development. The most critical line in this double-edged variation is thought to be 4.dxe6 Bxe6 5.Nf3.

=== 3.Bb5+ ===
A third major alternative is 3.Bb5+. The most popular reply is 3...Bd7, though the rarer 3...Nbd7 is gaining more attention recently. After 3.Bb5+ Bd7, White has several options. The most obvious is 4.Bxd7+, after which White can play to keep the extra pawn with 4...Qxd7 5.c4. The historical main line is 4.Bc4, which can lead to very sharp play after 4...Bg4 5.f3 Bf5 6.Nc3, or 4...b5 5.Bb3 a5. Finally, 4.Be2 has recently become more popular, attempting to exploit the misplaced bishop on d7 after 4...Nxd5.

=== Other lines ===
- 3.Nf3 is a flexible move that tends to transpose into other lines.
- 3.Nc3 transposes into a line of Alekhine's Defense that runs 1.e4 Nf6 2.Nc3 d5 3.exd5; it generally thought to be equal. After 3...Nxd5 4.Bc4, the most common reply is 4...Nb6, although 4...Nxc3, 4...c6, and 4...e6 are also viable continuations.

== Black's second-move alternatives ==
Besides 2...Qxd5 and 2...Nf6, other moves are rare:

- 2...c6, the Blackburne–Kloosterboer Gambit, was played successfully by Joseph Blackburne on at least one occasion, but after 3.dxc6 is thought to be unsound, and it is almost never seen in master-level play.
- 2...e6, intending 3.dxe6 Bxe6, is an even rarer gambit than 2...c6.

== Alternatives to 2.exd5 ==
2.exd5 is played in the overwhelming majority of games at all levels, and is generally considered the only move to offer White any serious prospects of an opening advantage. The Scandinavian is therefore arguably Black's most forcing defense to 1.e4. Nevertheless, White has a few alternatives.

- 2.Nc3 transposes into the Dunst Opening; Black can play 2...d4 with an easy game, or 2...dxe4 3.Nxe4 Bf5, a sort of Caro–Kann in which Black has saved a tempo by not playing ...c6.
- 2.e5 poses no problems for Black. Black can play ...c5, ...Bf5 or ...Bg4, and then ...e7–e6, reaching a favorable French Defense-like setup. Unlike in the French, Black's queen's bishop is not shut in on c8. This line can also be compared to the Caro–Kann Defense, where Black also usually avoids shutting in the bishop; in this line, Black plays ...c5 in one rather than two moves and has a comfortable position. On the other hand, 2.e5 avoids the open positions following 2.exd5, instead keeping the center closed with pawns, likely not Black's original intent.
- 2.d4 will probably lead to a Blackmar–Diemer Gambit after 2...dxe4, unless Black prefers to transpose into a French (2...e6), Caro–Kann (2...c6) or Nimzowitsch (2...Nc6).
- 2.Nf3?! is the dubious Tennison Gambit.

== See also ==
- List of chess openings
- List of chess openings named after places
