= Juan Mario Gomez Esteban =

Spanish chess grandmaster (born 1958)

Juan Mario Gómez Esteban

Personal information
- Born: 5 February 1958 (age 68) Santurtzi, Biscay, Spain

Chess career
- Country: Spain
- Title: Grandmaster (2004)
- Peak rating: 2517 (January 2007)

Juan Mario Gómez Esteban (born 5 February 1958) is a Spanish chess grandmaster (2004).

== Career ==
Gómez Esteban won the Spanish Chess Championship twice, in 1980 (ahead of International Master Francisco Javier Sanz Alonso) and in 1992 (ahead of International Master Francisco Javier Ochoa de Echagüen), and finished runner-up in 1983 behind International Master José García Padrón. He also won the 2002 Spanish Open Chess Championship, in a year when the closed championship was won by Alexei Shirov.

Representing Spain, he competed in four Chess Olympiads—Valletta 1980, Thessaloniki 1984, Manila 1992, and Istanbul 2000—as well as two European Team Chess Championships, in Haifa (1989) and Debrecen (1992).

At the regional level, Gómez Esteban won the Basque Individual Chess Championship nine times: in 1988, 1990, 1997, 1998, 2001, 2003, 2005, 2006, and 2009. In 2007, he finished fourth at the León International Open in June and competed for Club de Ajedrez Sestao at the Spanish Team Chess Championship in Seville. He has also won numerous local and regional tournaments in the Basque Country, including the Barakaldo City Council Trophy, the FVDA Open, the Arrigorriaga Christmas Tournament, the Virgen Blanca tournament, and the San Prudencio tournament.

== See also ==
- Chess in Spain
