= Chess in Spain =

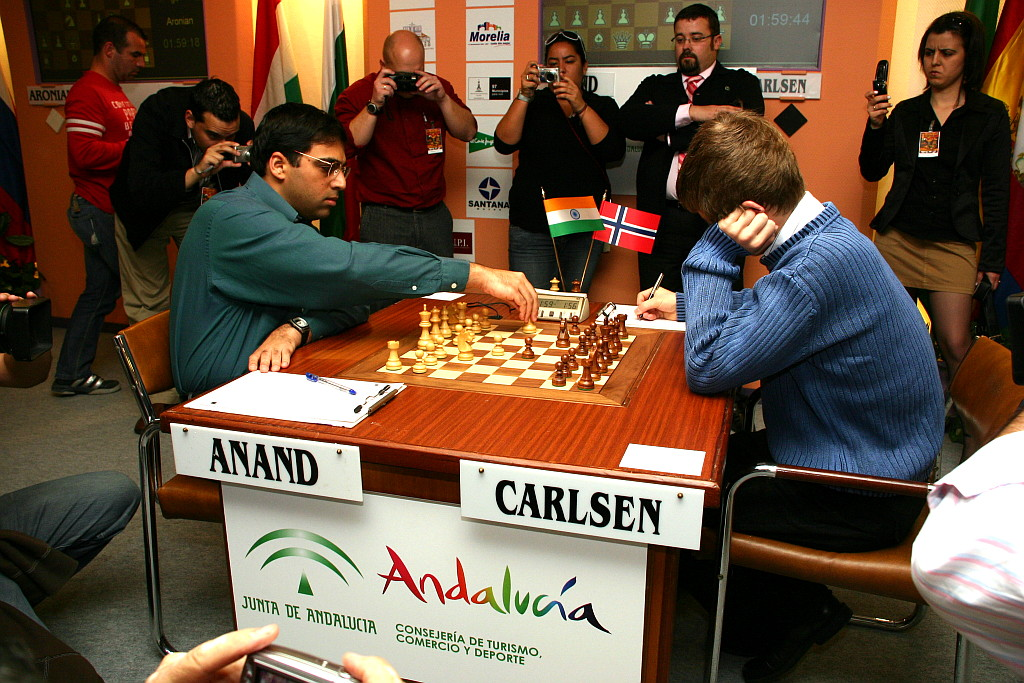
Viswanathan Anand and Magnus Carlsen competing in Linares in 2007.

Spain has significantly contributed to the history of chess from its integration around the 10th century to the present day. The Spanish received Shatranj, one of the predecessors of chess, from the Arabs during the Muslim conquest of the Iberian Peninsula between the 7th and 15th centuries. As chess spread to the rest of Europe, Spain contributed to the chess literature of the period, culminating with the Libro de los juegos (1283), commissioned by Alfonso X in the 13th century. Also of Spanish origin are the first archaeological pieces of evidence of the game in Europe: the Ager pieces, a set of medieval chess pieces dating from the 11th century, of abstract design and made of crystal, that belonged to Arnau Mir de Tost. During the Age of Discovery, Spain helped the globalization of Chess by introducing Chess to the Americas and the Philippines.

== Overview ==
With reformulations of the rules of the game in the late 15th century, Spain was one of the first European countries to stand out in chess. The Repetición de Amores y Arte de Axedrez (1497) by Luis Ramírez de Lucena and Libro de la Invención Liberal y Arte del Juego del Axedrez (1561) by Ruy López de Segura were the first literary works contemplating the new rules and innovations such as the capture en passant. However, after López's defeat by Giovanni Leonardo Di Bonna in 1575, Italian players showed to be extremely skilled.

The inclusion of the Queen in chess was probably influenced by medieval queens, of which the Spanish Queen Isabella I of Castile was likely the most influential. Isabella and her husband, Ferdinand II of Aragon, were known chess aficionados and, by expelling the Jews from Spain in the late 15th century, helped spread the new rules to the rest of Europe.

Spain has no great highlights in the chess Olympiad, with the best results being individual medals per board. The Spanish team has won a total of seven medals in the men's category (one gold, two silver, and four bronze), and three medals in the women's category (two silver and one bronze). Spain hosted the 2004 Olympiad and the 1987 World Championships.

== Historical overview ==
Around 711, the Iberian Peninsula was invaded by the Muslims, under the command of Tariq, who crossed the Mediterranean Sea at the Strait of Gibraltar and entered the Peninsula defeating Roderic, the last Visigoth king of Hispania, at the Battle of Guadalete. In the following years, the Muslims extended their conquests, taking over the territory of Al-Andalus, which they ruled for almost eight hundred years. Despite the constant conflicts that lasted until the reconquest of the entire territory, the Arab culture had intense contact with the Christian kingdoms.

== Archaeological evidence ==
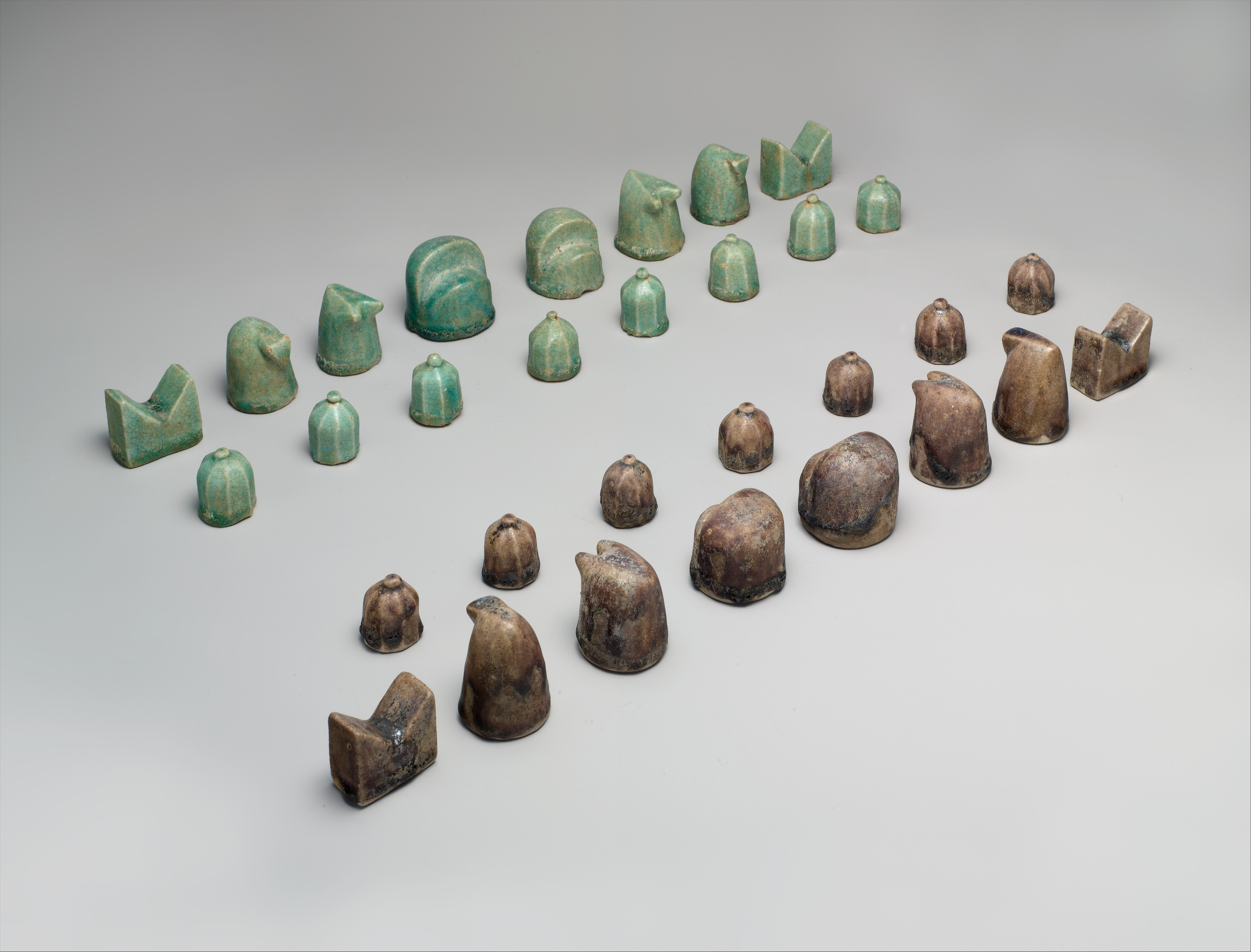
Set of artifacts similar to those found in Spain.

Following the Qur'anic interpretation of not representing living figures, the first sets of chess pieces found in Spain were abstract. The Ager set of pieces, which belonged to Ermessenda Countess of Urgel, and were left in her will to the Church of Saint Giles in the year 1058, are among the earliest archaeological evidence on European soil. A total of 44 crystal pieces with abstract shapes remained, with the King represented by only one throne and the ferz, predecessor of the Queen, by a slightly smaller throne. From this period, there are records of other pieces donated through wills to churches and monasteries in Spain and southern France. Abstract crystal pieces have also been found in the northern towns of Celanova and San Millán de la Cogolla, all dating between the 10th and 11th centuries. Another piece of Spanish origin dating to the 12th century has a humanized representation of a small Lady encased on a throne, wearing a headdress similar to that worn by women of the period.

== Literature ==
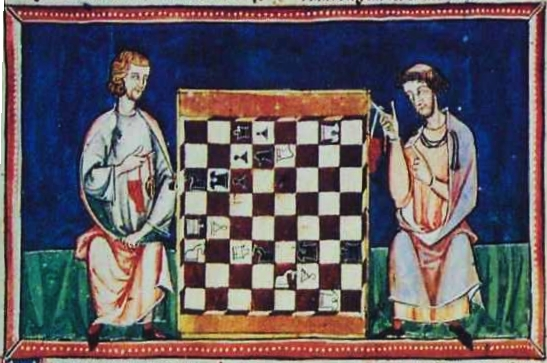
Illustration from the Libro de los Juegos (1283).

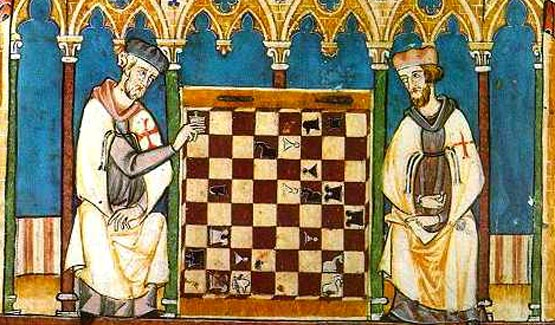
Knights Templar in illustration from the Libro de los Juegos.

In literature, the poem Verses on the Game of Chess written by the Spanish Rabbi Abraham ibn Ezra at the end of the 11th century did not include the Queen in the game, but a later poem by the same author makes this mention (Shegal). These records show the European origin of the inclusion of the Queen in the game since in the Arab version of chess played in Spain, the figure of the ferz coexisted until the 13th century. Ezra lived with both Christians and Arabs and probably received the piece from the former. Another work, written by Petrus Alphonsi called Disciplina Clerical which is essentially a collection of texts translated from Arabic, mentions chess as one of the seven skills expected of a knight.

The most important work of the period was the Libro de los Juegos, a work commissioned by Alfonso X of Castile and completed in 1283, which consists of 93 scrolls illustrated with approximately 150 color figures. It contains 103 chess problems, which are Arabic models similar to endgames; fourteen of these problems are distinguished by having a greater richness in their composition in which one side has a clear material advantage, having likely been created by another author. The first five pages contain a description of the philosophy of chess, the rules, movement, shape of each piece, and their relative value. The illustrations contain a wide representation of the court and how the game was played by courtiers, foreigners, Muslims, Jews, and Christians. One of the illustrations contains Edward I of England with his bride Eleonor of Castile.

The book's contribution to the history of chess resides as a fine work of medieval literature, although it did not become a reference due to the works published by Italians and Germans on the game. The main innovations compared to the Arabic rules were the inclusion of the privilege of the Queen being able to perform a jump on her first move in the game, provided that the destination square be unoccupied and does not put the opponent's King in check, and the double advancement of the Pawn by two squares, which was allowed for all Pawns until a capture was made in the game.

== The beginning of the new rules ==
In the late Middle Ages, the Queen's movement was expanded reaching the current rule. The first evidence of this new rule can be found in the Catalan poem Hobra intitulada scachs damor feta per don franci de Castelvi e narcis vinyoles e mossen fenollar sots nom de tres planets ço es Març Venus e Mercuri per conjunccio e influencia dels quals fon inventeda written between 1470 and 1480. The poem describes a game with the current movement rules between Mars wooing Venus, observed by Mercury, and reiterates that only one Queen is allowed on the board and when she is captured the game is virtually lost. The poem describes other rules of the game such as the en passant capture, the possibility of the King jumping on the first move as long as he does not pass through an attacked square and does not capture opponent's pieces, and that the player must move the piece that was touched, and capture the opponent's piece that it touched.

Besides this manuscript, two other books describe the new rules of the game: the Libre Del jochs partits dels schachs em nombre de 100 by Francisco Vicente, lost in 1811 during a sacking by Napoleon's soldiers of the monastery of Montserrat, and the Repetición de Amores y Arte de Axedrez by Luis Ramírez de Lucena, printed in the city of Salamanca and dedicated to Prince John, son of Ferdinand and Isabella of Castile. Lucena's book also contains 150 problems from two to ten moves with both the old and new rules, as well as the analysis of eleven openings, considered by the author to be the best in Italy, France, and Spain. However, the analysis is not systematic and contains errors due to the confusion between the old rules with the new ones. The change in rules was so significant that the game was called Lucena dela dama and the old version del viejo.

== From Lopez to Leonardo ==
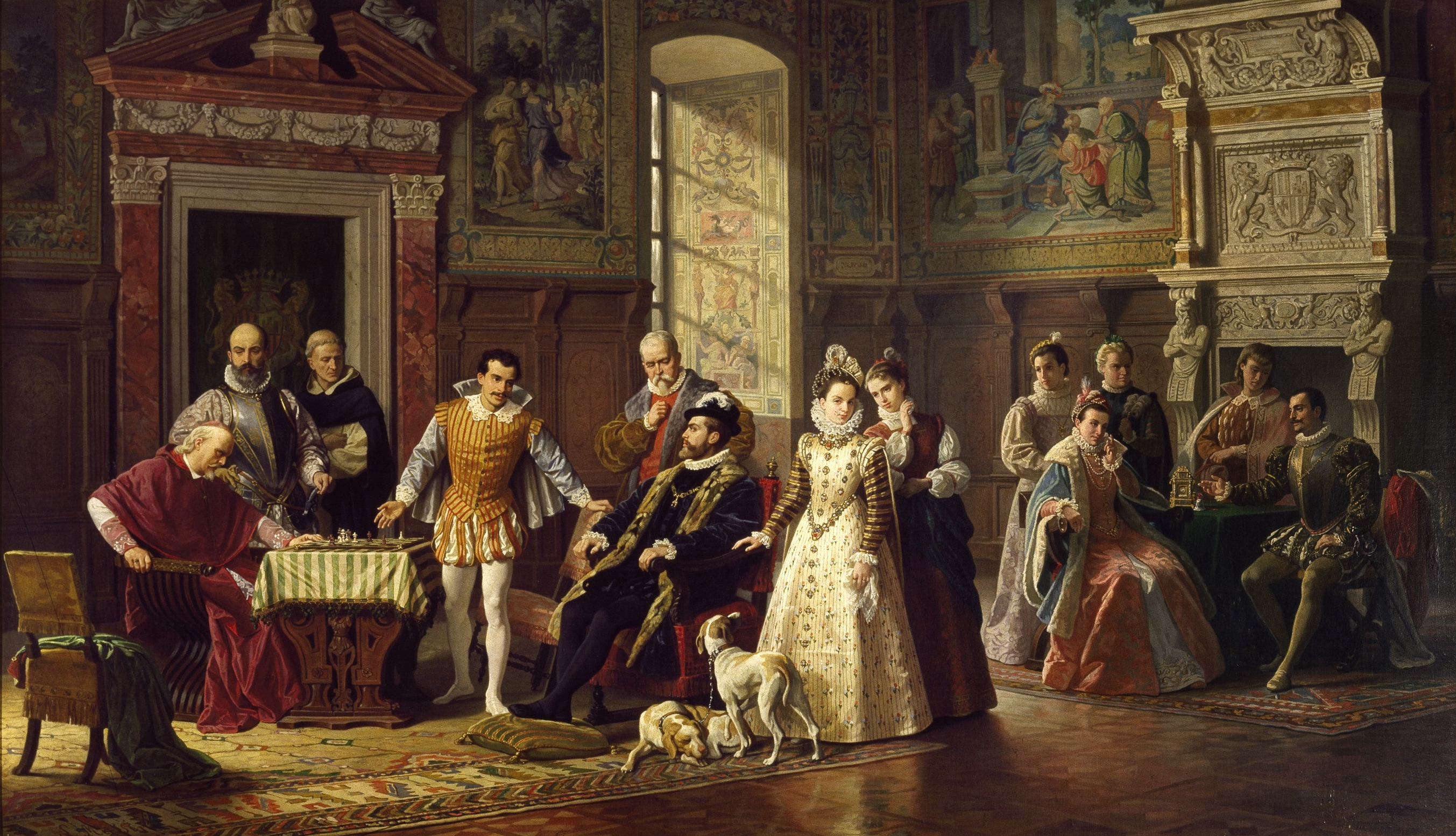
Sfida scacchistica alla corte del Re di Spagna, by Luigi Mussini (1883)

In 1559, with the ascension of Pope Pius IV, several clergymen went to Rome, and among them was Father Ruy López de Segura, considered the best player in Spain. López considered that Italian players still had much to learn before they could match the Spanish, and among his opponents in Italy was Giovanni Leonardo Di Bonna, il puttino. He wrote the Libro de la invencion liberal y arte del juego del Axedrez in 1561, based on the work of Pedro Damiano de Odemira Questo Libro e da impare giocare a scachi et de la Partite, which he had acquired in Italy and whose content he found poor. The book contains several new openings but López's analysis was not as good as his skill at the game. In 1574, López was defeated by Leonardo in the presence of King Philip II of Spain and shortly after was defeated again by another Italian named Paolo Boi.

In the late 16th century, St. Teresa of Ávila published the work Camino de Perfección, in which she used chess as a metaphor for moral progress, although the game was frowned upon by the Order of Carmelites. For this work, St. Teresa was named the patroness of chess in Spain in 1944.

== Ferdinand and Isabella of Castile and the Spread of Chess ==
Position: a8 white king, c8 black king, h8 black rook, c7 black pawn, e6 white pawn, f5 white rook, b4 white pawn, g4 white rook, b3 black knight, h3 white bishop, c1 black rook, e1 black queen

Fernando vs. Fonseca. White plays and wins.

Isabella I of Castile and Ferdinand II of Aragon were keen chess players. Pulgar, the royal historian, reports that Ferdinand devoted more time to chess and backgammon than he should have, while Isabella disapproved of games of chance and banned them at the royal court. In 1487, during the siege of the city of Málaga in the Granada War, a Faqīh named Ibrahim Al-Gervi attempted to assassinate the royal couple, who were often seen playing chess. However, the assassin mistook for the queen and king Beatriz de Bobadilla, a friend of the queen, and a nobleman named Alvaro of Portugal, who were playing chess there. Beatriz survived the attempt, and Al-Gervi was killed on the spot by Castilian soldiers.

Around 1491, Christopher Columbus was seeking financial support for his plan to travel to the Indies via a new route. Although it was his third attempt to convince the Spanish Monarchs, on this occasion Isabella was convinced that supporting such an expedition could bring honor and wealth to Spain. Columbus sought the posts of Admiral and Viceroy as one of the conditions for him to continue with his plan, but these titles were considered extravagant for a navigator with little experience. Ferdinand was asked about this demand when he was concentrating on a chess match. Isabel then helped him achieve a winning move and convinced him to grant the title to the Genoese navigator. Spain would go on to introduced Chess to the Americas and the Philippines in the following centuries. Chess legend José Raúl Capablanca, was born in Cuba during the time it was in the Spanish Empire to Spanish parents, the son of a Spanish army officer, José María Capablanca, and a Spanish woman from Catalonia, Matilde María Graupera y Marín.

In 1492, through the Alhambra Decree, Ferdinand and Isabella expelled about two thousand families of Jews from Spain, who emigrated to other major cities in Europe, Turkey, and the Near East. This may have spurred the spread of the new rules for chess, which became firmly established as early as the first half of the 16th century.

== Present ==
In the early 20th century, the Spanish government funded mathematician and civil engineer Leonardo Torres Quevedo in developing the automaton known as El Ajedrecista, which aimed to demonstrate that a machine was capable of executing a set of instructions. The automaton was capable of automatically playing an endgame of Bare King against Rook and King from any position, without any human intervention. This device is considered the world's first computer game. It was first presented in Paris in 1914 and was a success, defeating in 1951 Savielly Tartakower, the first Grandmaster to be defeated by a machine.

In 1924, the International Chess Federation (FIDE) was founded, with Spain as one of its founding members, and three years later the Federación Española de Ajedrez (FEDA) was founded in the city of Barcelona, the maximum entity in the organization and regulation of competitions in the country. Its men's national championship was first played in 1902 but only after 1942 on an annual basis, while women's began in 1950 and was held biennially until 1971 when it became annual.

The country regularly participates in the Chess Olympiad and hosted the event in Calvià (2004). Its best result in men's was sixth place in Yerevan (2006) and women's, third place in Haifa (1976). Individually, the country holds one gold medal, in Thessaloniki, 1984, on the 1st reserve); two silver, in Buenos Aires (1978, on the fourth board) and Dresden (2008, on the second); and four bronze, Leipzig (1960) and Varna (1962, on the second board), Bled (2002) and Turin (2006, on the third board). In the women's Olympiad, the country had its first participation in the edition in Medellín (1974) and the best individual results were two silver medals in Medellín (1974) and Haifa (1976, on the second board), and a bronze medal in Bled (2002, on the third board).

Spain has hosted FIDE events such as the 1987 World Championship, the World Junior Championship in 1965 in Barcelona, two quarterfinals of the 1971 Candidates Tournament, won by Bobby Fischer, and several zonal tournaments of both the men's and women's World Championships. The Linares Tournament has been held since 1978 in the city of Linares, with the participation of the best players in the world. In the year 1994, the average Elo rating of the competition was 2685, being the first category XVIII event ever held, and in 1998 the event reached category XXI.

== See also ==
- Chess in Europe
- Chess piece
- List of Spanish chess players

== Bibliography ==
- Golombek, Harry (1977). Golombek's Encyclopedia of chess (1st ed.). Trewin Copplestone Publishing. ISBN 0-517-53146-1.
- Hooper, David; Whyld, Kenneth (1992). The Oxford Companion to Chess (2nd ed.). England: Oxford University Press. ISBN 0-19-866164-9.
- Murray, H.J.R. (1985) [1913]. A History of Chess. Oxford: Benjamin Press. ISBN 0936317019.
- Sunnucks, Anne (1976). The Encyclopaedia of Chess (2nd ed.). England: St Martin Press. ISBN 0-7091-4697-3.
- Yalom, Marilyn (2004). Birth of the Chess Queen. HarperCollins Publisher Inc. ISBN 0-06-009064-2.
