= Scachs d'amor =

15th century Catalan poem

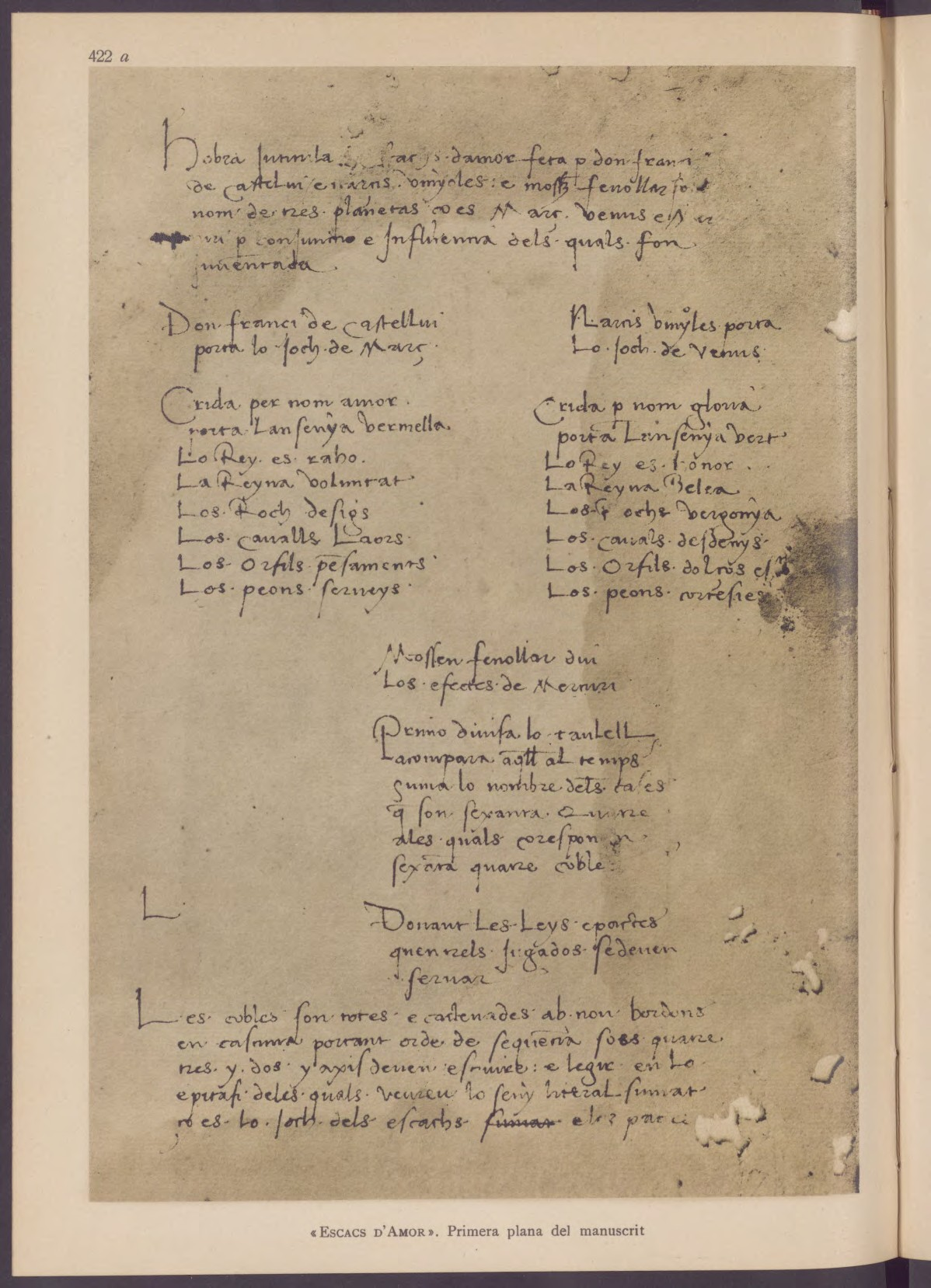
First page of the manuscript

Scachs d'amor (Valencian: [esˈkagz ðaˈmoɾ], meaning "Chess of Love"), whose complete title is Hobra intitulada scachs d'amor feta per don Francí de Castellví e Narcis Vinyoles e mossén Fenollar, is the name of a poem written by Francesc de Castellví, Bernat Fenollar, and Narcís Vinyoles, published in Valencia, Kingdom of Valencia, towards the end of the 15th century.

The manuscript, written in Valencian language probably in 1475, was discovered in 1905 by Ignacio Casanovas at Capella del Palau. Though the original was lost, a photograph of the codex has been kept at the Library of Catalonia in Barcelona.

The poem is conceived as a chess game in which the players are Castellví, playing White (in modern chess) (Mars Març, Love Amor, and red pieces in the game), and Vinyoles, playing Black (Venus, the Glory Gloria, and green pieces). They debate about love, and Fenollar comments and establishes the rules. The opening in the game would, centuries later, be called the Scandinavian Defense. Notably, the game ends in a pure mate, which is a specific class of checkmate generally considered to be aesthetically pleasing. Green and red are still used in xiangqi as the colors for the pieces.

The poem uses the game as an allegory for love. Its structure is based upon sixty-four stanzas (the same as the number of chessboard squares), nine verses each. The stanzas are grouped three after three: The first stanza in the group represents White's move, the second one Black's move, and the third one a comment on the rules by the arbiter. The three stanzas in the beginning are an introduction and the last one is checkmate.

This is believed to be the earliest documented game of chess with the modern rules concerning the moves of the queen and bishop. However, it is unknown whether the complete modern rules of chess were in use as of this game, because neither player castled or captured en passant.

== The game ==
Scachs d'amor, 1475

White: Francesc de Castellví Black: Narcís Vinyoles Opening: Scandinavian Defense, (ECO B01)
Valencia, Crown of Aragon, 1475

1.e4 d5 2.exd5 Qxd5 3.Nc3 Qd8 4.Bc4 Nf6 5.Nf3 Bg4 6.h3 Bxf3 7.Qxf3 e6 8.Qxb7 Nbd7 9.Nb5 Rc8 10.Nxa7 Nb6 11.Nxc8 Nxc8 12.d4 Nd6 13.Bb5+ Nxb5 14.Qxb5+ Nd7 15.d5 exd5 16.Be3 Bd6 17.Rd1 Qf6 18.Rxd5 Qg6 19.Bf4 Bxf4 20.Qxd7+ Kf8 21.Qd8# 1–0

The game is not particularly well played: for example, instead of playing 6.h3 White could play 6.Bxf7+ or 6.Ne5 with a big advantage in both cases. However the game was in its infancy, and the moves allegorize the love affairs that constitute the basic literary plot. For this reason, the authors did not care much if the movements were technically good or bad, but if they harmonized with the development of the literary plot.

== See also ==
- Versus de scachis, the earliest known reference to chess in a European text
- Chess in early literature
- History of chess
- Libro de los Juegos
