= Queen (chess) =

Chess piece

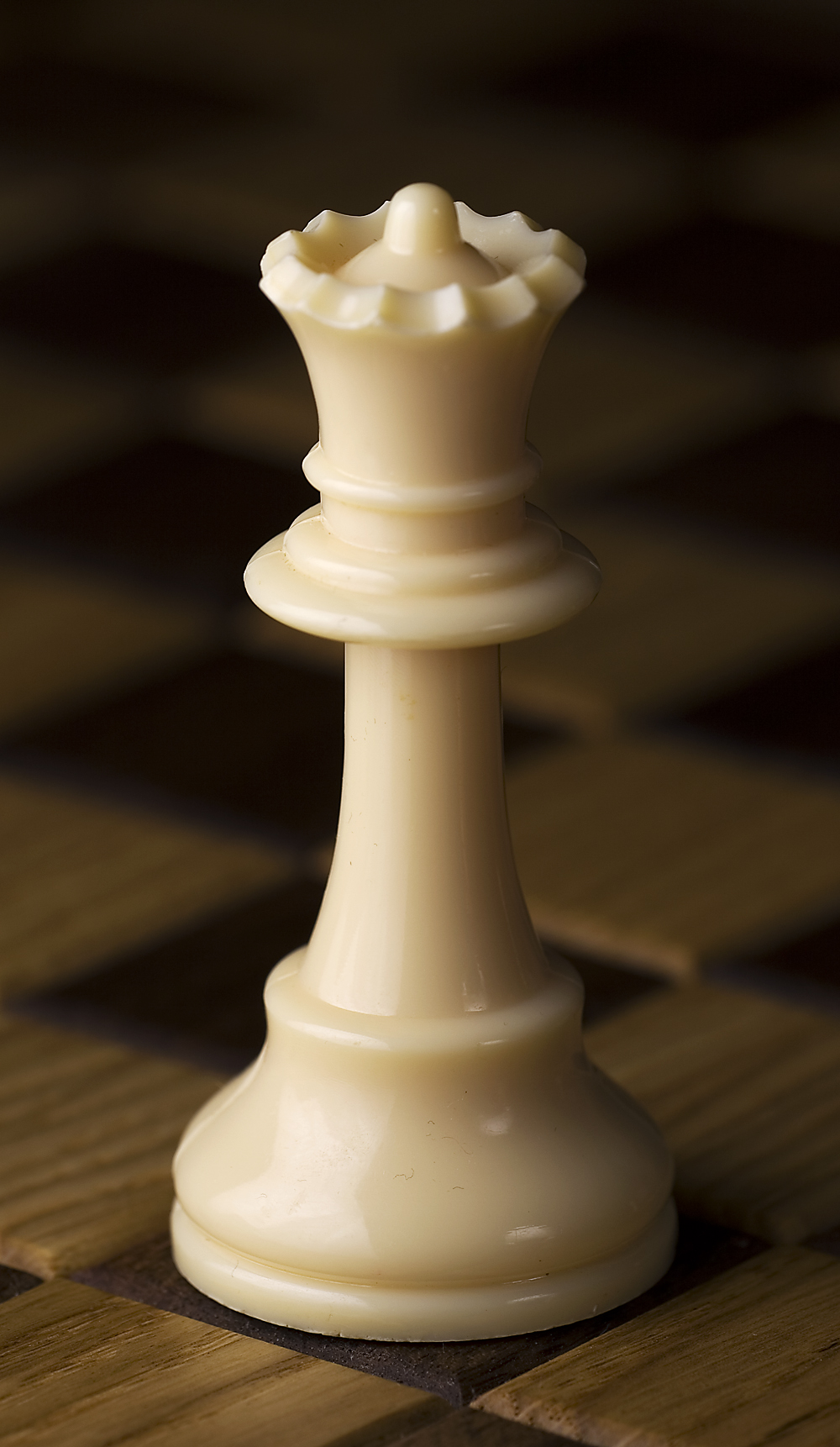
White queen

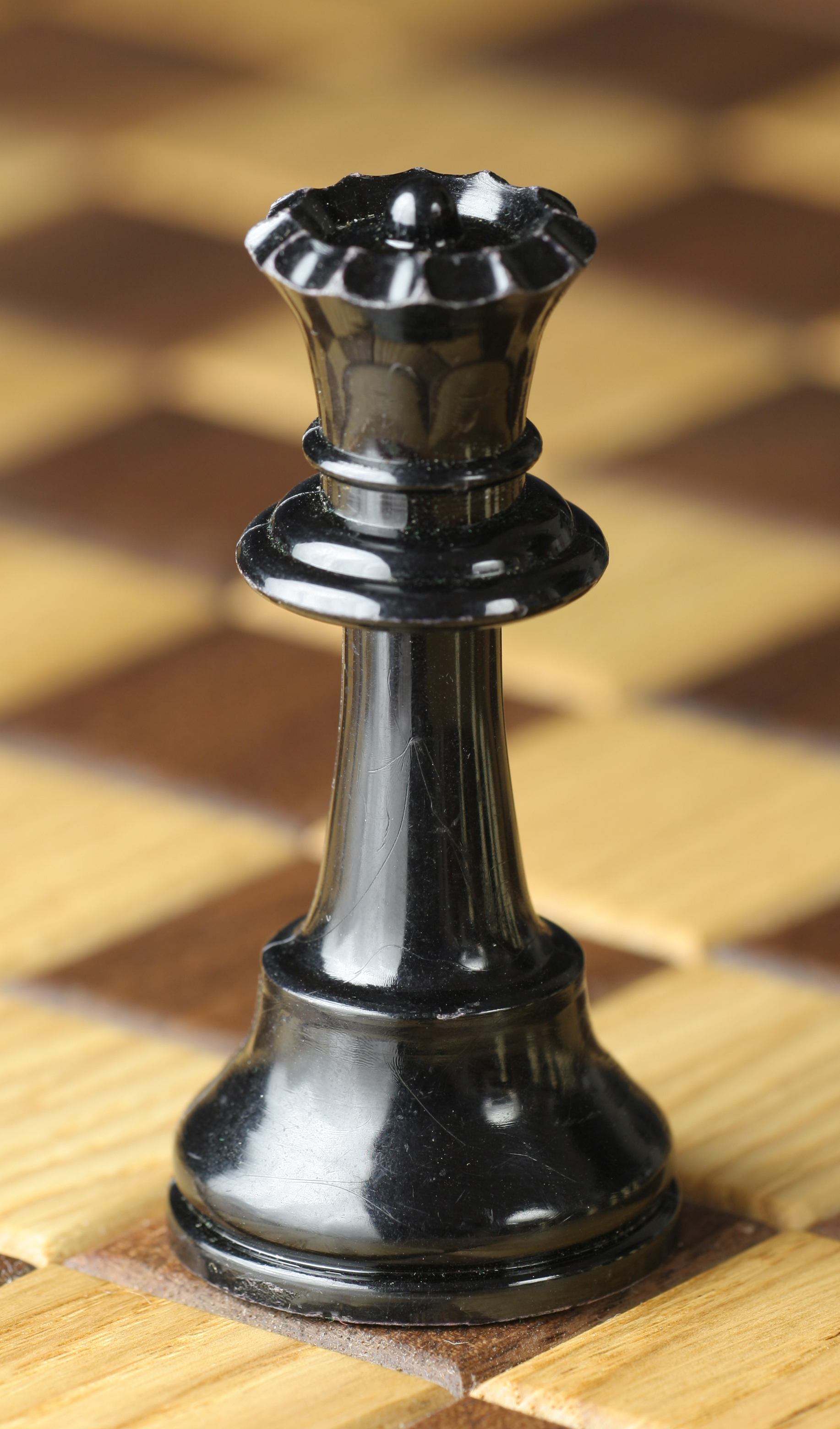
Black queen

The queen (♕, ♛) is the most powerful piece in the game of chess. It can move any number of squares vertically, horizontally, or diagonally, combining the powers of the rook and bishop. Each player starts the game with one queen, placed in the middle of the first rank next to the king. Because the queen is the strongest piece, a pawn is promoted to a queen in the vast majority of cases; if a pawn is promoted to a piece other than a queen, it is called underpromotion.

The predecessor to the queen is the ferz, a weak piece originating from the Persian game of shatranj, able to move or capture only one step diagonally. The queen acquired its modern move in Spain in the 15th century.

== Placement and movement ==
The white queen starts on d1, while the black queen starts on d8. With the chessboard oriented correctly, the white queen starts on a white square and the black queen starts on a black square—thus the mnemonics "queen gets her color", "queen on [her] [own] color", or "the dress [queen piece] matches the shoes [square]" (Latin: servat rēgīna colōrem).

The queen can move any number of unoccupied squares in a straight line vertically, horizontally, or diagonally, thus combining the moves of the rook and bishop. The queen captures by moving to the square on which an enemy piece stands.

Position: d8 black queen, d1 white queen

Initial placement of the queens – d1 and d8

Position: d8 white circle, h8 white circle, a7 white circle, d7 white circle, g7 white circle, b6 white circle, d6 white circle, f6 white circle, c5 white circle, d5 white circle, e5 white circle, a4 white circle, b4 white circle, c4 white circle, d4 white queen, e4 white circle, f4 white circle, g4 white circle, h4 white circle, c3 white circle, d3 white circle, e3 white circle, b2 white circle, d2 white circle, f2 white circle, a1 white circle, d1 white circle, g1 white circle

Possible moves of the queen

Although each player starts with one queen, a pawn can be promoted to any of several types of pieces, including a queen, when the pawn is moved to the player's furthest rank (the opponent's first rank). Such a queen created by promotion can be an additional or replacement queen. The queen is by far the most common piece type that a pawn is promoted to due to the relative power of a queen. Promotion to a queen is colloquially called queening.

== Dimensions and design ==
The queen is traditionally the second tallest piece in a chess set after the king. It is distinguished by a stylized crown or coronet with multiple points or bumps, often topped with an orb in the center. In the Staunton design, the queen has a wide, stable base and a body that tapers upwards, often with a vase-like shape.

== Piece value ==
The queen is typically worth about nine pawns, which is slightly stronger than a rook and a bishop together, but slightly weaker than two rooks, though there are exceptions. It is almost always disadvantageous to exchange the queen for a single piece other than the enemy's queen.

The reason that the queen is stronger than a combination of a rook and a bishop, even though they control the same number of squares, is twofold. First, the queen is more mobile than the rook and the bishop, as the entire power of the queen can be transferred to another location in one move, while transferring the entire firepower of a rook and bishop requires two moves, the bishop always being restricted to squares of one color. Second, unlike the bishop, the queen is not hampered by an inability to control squares of the opposite color to the square on which it stands. A factor in favor of the rook and bishop together is that they can attack (or defend) a square twice, whereas a queen can do so only once. However, experience has shown that this factor is usually less significant than the combined points favoring the queen.

The queen is strongest when the board is open, the enemy king is poorly defended, or there are loose (i.e., undefended) pieces in the enemy camp. Because of its long range and ability to move in multiple directions, the queen is well-equipped to execute forks. Compared to other long-range pieces (i.e., rooks and bishops), the queen is less restricted and stronger in closed positions.

== Strategy ==
A player should generally delay developing the queen, as developing it too quickly can expose it to attacks by enemy pieces, causing the player to lose time removing the queen from danger. Despite this, beginners often develop the queen early in the game, hoping to plunder the enemy position and deliver an early checkmate, such as the scholar's mate.

Early queen attacks are rare in high-level chess, but there are some openings with early queen development that are used by high-level players. For example, the Scandinavian Defense (1.e4 d5), which often features queen moves by Black on the second and third moves, is considered sound and has been played at the world championship level. Some less common examples have also been observed in high-level games. The Danvers Opening (1.e4 e5 2.Qh5), which is widely characterized as a beginner's opening, has occasionally been played by the American grandmaster Hikaru Nakamura.

A queen exchange often marks the beginning of the endgame, but there are queen endgames, and sometimes queens are exchanged in the opening, long before the endgame. A common goal in the endgame is to promote a pawn to a queen. As the queen has the largest range and mobility, queen and king vs. lone king is an easy win when compared to some other basic mates. Queen and king vs. rook and king is also a win for the player with the queen, but it is not easy.

== Queen sacrifice ==
A queen sacrifice is the deliberate sacrifice of a queen in order to gain a more favorable tactical position. One of the most widely known examples of this was in the game Anderssen–Kieseritzky, 1851, where Anderssen sacrificed a queen (along with three other pieces) to reach checkmate.

== History ==
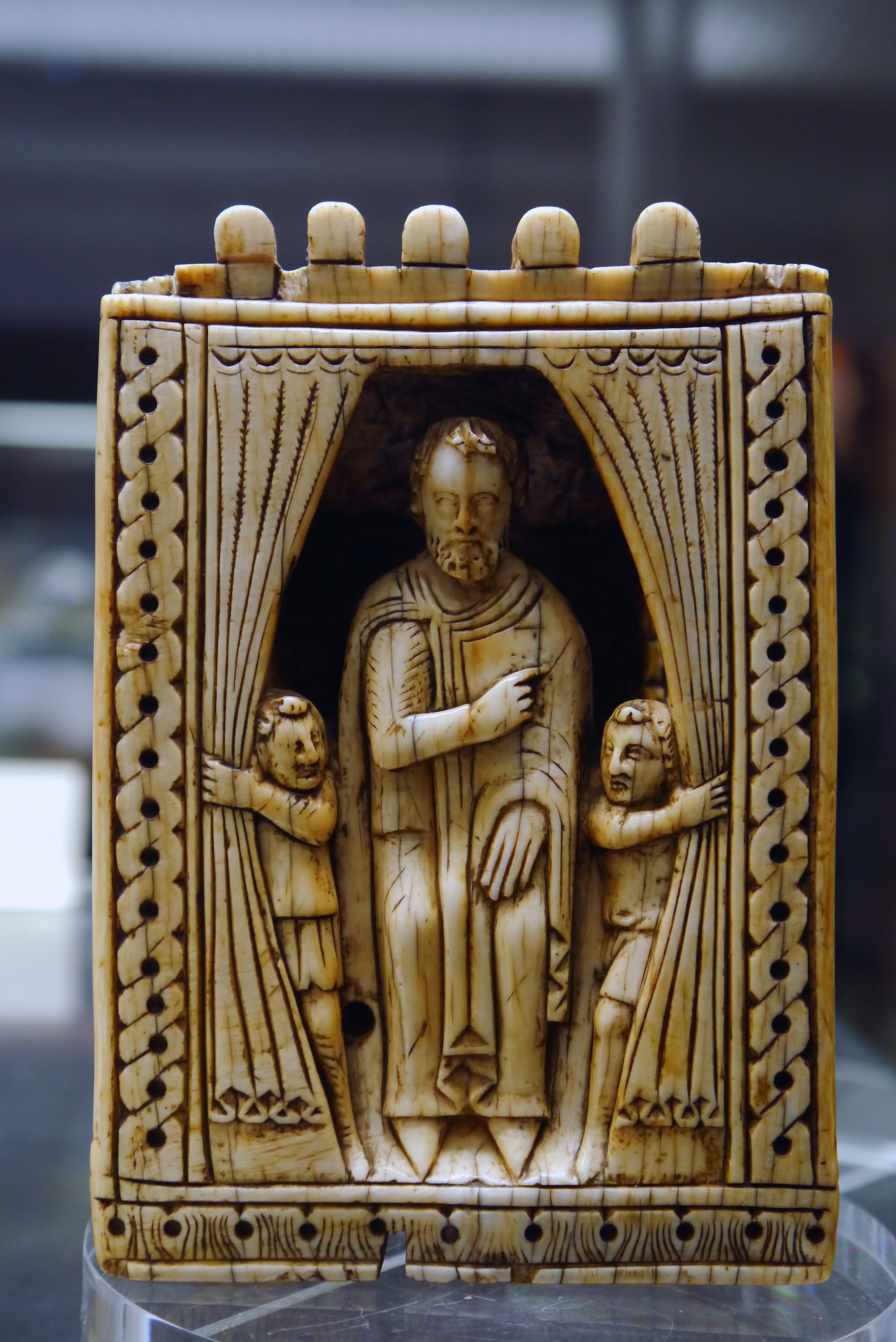
Vizier piece from a Southern Italian chess set, 12th century

The queen was originally the counsellor or prime minister or vizier (Sanskrit mantri, Persian farzīn, Arabic firzān, firz or wazīr). Initially, its only move was one square diagonally. Around 1300, its abilities were enhanced to allow it to jump two squares diagonally (onto a same-colored square) for its first move.

The fers changed into the queen over time. The first surviving mention of this piece as a queen or similar is the Latin regina in the Einsiedeln Poem, a 98-line Medieval Latin poem written around 997 and preserved in a monastery at Einsiedeln in Switzerland. Some surviving early medieval pieces depict the piece as a queen. The word fers became grammatically feminized in several languages, such as alferza in Spanish and fierce or fierge in French. The Carmina Burana also refer to the queen as femina (woman) and coniunx (spouse), and the name amazon has sometimes been seen.

During the great chess reform at the end of the 15th century, Catholic nations kept using an equivalent of Latin domina ('lady'), such as dama in Spanish, donna in Italy, and dame in France, all of which evoke "Our Lady". Protestant nations such as Germany and England, however, refused any derivatives of domina as it might have suggested some cult of the Virgin Mary, and instead opted for secular terms such as Königin in German and "queen" in English.

In Russian, the piece keeps its Persian name of ferz; koroleva ('queen') is colloquial and is never used by professional chess players. The names korolevna ('king's daughter'), tsaritsa ('tsar's wife'), and baba ('old woman'), however, are attested as early as 1694. In Arabic countries, the queen remains termed, and in some cases depicted, as a vizier.

Historian Marilyn Yalom proposes several factors that might have been partly responsible for influencing the piece towards its identity as a queen and its power in modern chess: the prominence of medieval queens such as Eleanor of Aquitaine, Blanche of Castile, and more particularly Isabella I of Castile; the cult of the Virgin Mary; the power ascribed to women in the troubadour tradition of courtly love; and the medieval popularity of chess as a game particularly suitable for women to play on equal terms with men. She points to medieval poetry depicting the Virgin as the chess-queen of God or Fierce Dieu.

Significantly, the earliest surviving treatise to describe the modern movement of the queen (as well as the bishop and pawn), Repetición de amores e arte de axedres con CL iuegos de partido ('Discourses on Love and the Art of Chess with 150 Problems') by Luis Ramírez de Lucena, was published during the reign of Isabella I of Castile. Even before that, the Valencian poem Scachs d'amor ("Chess of Love") depicted a chess game between Francesc de Castellví and Narcís de Vinyoles and commented on by Bernat Fenollar, which clearly had the modern moves of the queen and the bishop. Well before the queen's powers expanded, it was already being romantically described as essential to the king's survival, so that when the queen was lost, there was nothing more of value on the board.

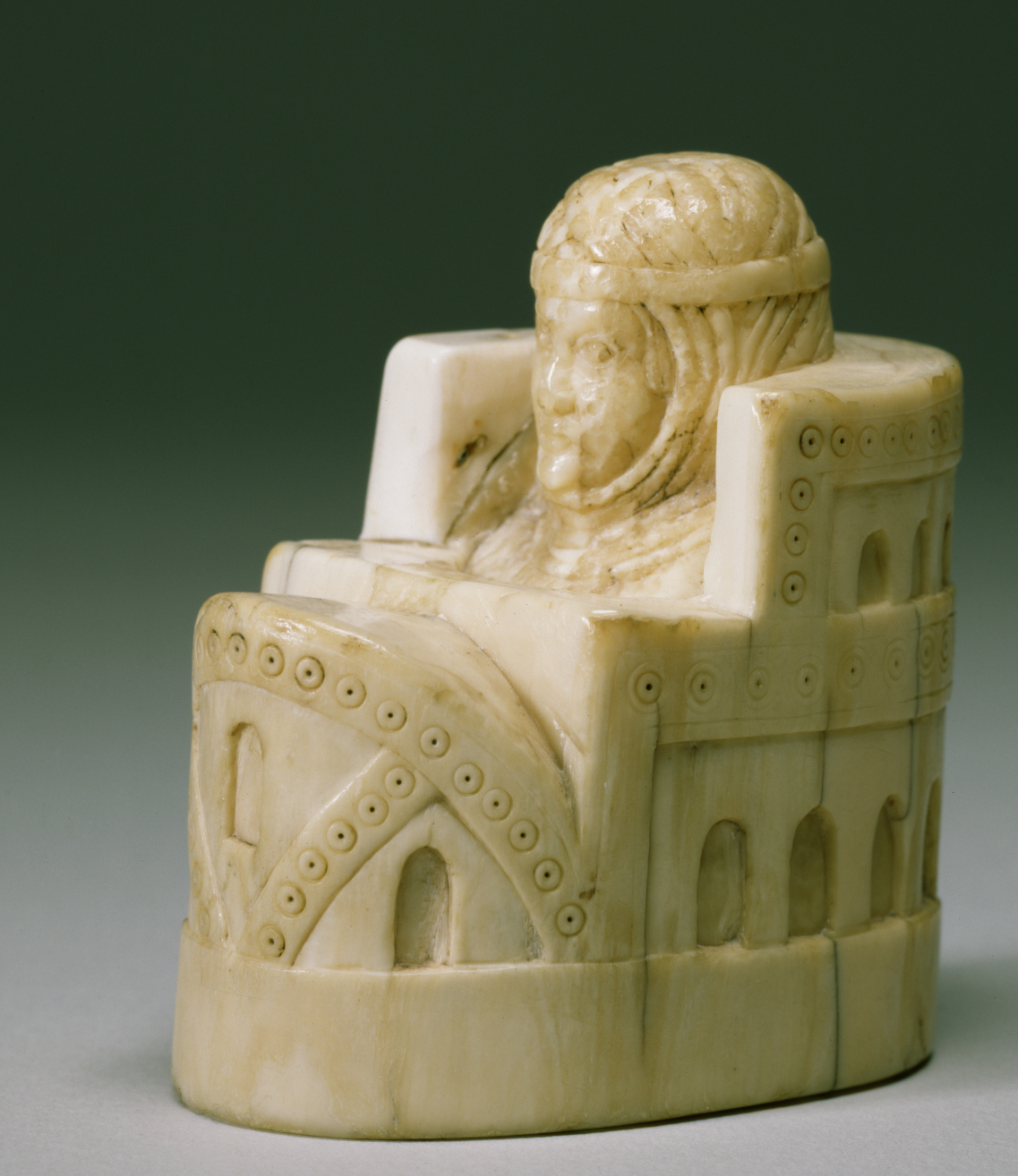
Queen from Spain, 12th century (walrus tusk)

Marilyn Yalom wrote that:

- The chess queen, rather than ferz or similar, is known of in what is now Spain and Portugal only from the 12th century, but started sooner elsewhere.
- The modern move of the queen started in Spain during Isabella I's reign, perhaps inspired by her great political power, and spread from there, perhaps being spread by the invention of printing and the 1492 Expulsion from Spain of the Jews who carried the new chess rule with them as they fled.

During the 15th century, the queen's move took its modern form as a combination of the move of the rook and the current move of the bishop. Starting from Spain, this new version – called 'queen's chess' (in Italian, scacchi della donna) or, pejoratively, 'madwoman's chess' (scacchi alla rabiosa) – spread throughout Europe rapidly, partly due to the advent of the printing press and the popularity of new books on chess. The new rules faced a backlash in some quarters, ranging from anxiety over a powerful female warrior figure to frank abuse against women in general.

At various times, the ability of pawns to be queened was restricted while the original queen was still on the board, so as not to cause scandal by providing the king with more than one queen. An early 12th-century Latin poem refers to a queened pawn as a ferzia, as opposed to the original queen or regina, to account for this.

When the queen was attacked, it was customary to warn the opponent by announcing "gardez la reine" or simply "gardez", similar to the announcement of "check". Some published rules even required this announcement before the queen could be legally captured. This custom was largely abandoned in the 19th century.

In Russia, for a long time, the queen could also move like a knight; some players disapproved of this ability to "gallop like the horse" (knight). The book A History of Chess by H.J.R. Murray, says that William Coxe, who was in Russia in 1772, saw chess played with the queen also moving like a knight. Such an augmented queen piece is now known as the fairy chess piece amazon.

Around 1230, the queen was also independently invented as a piece in Japan, where it formed part of the game of dai shogi. The piece was retained in the smaller and more popular chu shogi, but does not form a part of modern shogi.

=== Nomenclature ===
In most languages the piece is known as "queen" or "lady" (e.g. Italian regina or Spanish dama). Asian and Eastern European languages tend to refer to it as vizier, minister, or advisor (e.g. Arabic/Persian وزیر wazir (vazir), Russian/Persian ферзь/فرز ferz). In Polish it is known as the hetman, the name of a major historical military-political office, while in Estonian it is called lipp ('flag', 'standard').

Overview of chess piece names
Language	Queen	Translation
Adyghe	Г гуащэ / озир (gwashe / wezir)	lady / vizier
Afrikaans	D Dame	lady
Albanian	D Dama / Mbretëresha	lady / queen
Arabic	و وزير (wazïr)	vizier
Azerbaijani	V Vəzir	vizier
Armenian	Թ Թագուհի (T῾agowhi)	queen
Basque	D Dama	lady
Belarusian (Taraškievica)	Вз візыр	vizier
Bengali	M মন্ত্রী (montri)	Minister
Bulgarian	Д дама / царица	lady / queen
Catalan	D dama / reina	lady / queen
Chinese	Q 后 (hòu)	queen / 后
Czech	D dáma	lady
Danish	D dronning	queen
Dutch	D dame / koningin	lady / queen
English	Q queen	
Esperanto	D damo	lady
Estonian	L lipp	flag
Finnish	D daami / kuningatar	lady / queen
French	D dame / reine	lady / queen
Galician	D dama / raíña	lady / queen
Georgian	ლ ლაზიერი (lazieri)	queen
German	D Dame	lady / queen
Greek	Β βασίλισσα (vasílissa)	queen
Hindi	V वज़ीर / रानी (vazīr / rānī)	vizier / queen
Hebrew	מה מלכה (Malka)	queen
Hausa	Q sarauniya	queen
Hungarian	V vezér / királynő	leader / queen
Icelandic	D drottning	queen
Ido	D damo	lady
Indonesian	M menteri	minister / vizier
Interslavic	C carica / dama	empress / lady
Irish	B banríon	queen
Italian	D donna / regina	lady / queen
Japanese	Q クイーン (kuīn) / 奔 奔王 (hon'ō)	
Javanese	Q ratu / perdhana mentri	queen / prime minister
Kannada	ಮ ಮಂತ್ರಿ (mantri)	minister
Kabardian	Г гуащэ / уэзир (gwashe / wezir)	lady / vizier
Kazakh	У уәзір (uäzır)	vizier
Korean	Q 퀸 (kwin)	
Latin	D domina	queen
Latvian	D dāma	lady
Lithuanian	V valdovė	queen
Luxembourgish	D Damm	lady
Macedonian	D кралица / дама	queen / lady
Malayalam	Q മന്ത്രി (manthri)	minister
Marathi	V वजीर (vajīr)	vizier
Mongolian	Б бэрс (bers)	
Norwegian Bokmål	D dronning	queen
Norwegian Nynorsk	D dronning	queen
Odia	Q ରାଣୀ (raṇi)	queen
Oromo
Persian	و وزیر	vizier / minister
Polish	H hetman / królowa	general (hist.) / queen
Portuguese	D dama / rainha	lady / queen
Romanian	D damă / regină	lady / queen
Russian	Ф ферзь / королева (ferz' / koroleva)	vizier / queen
Scottish Gaelic	B bànrigh	queen
Serbo-Croatian	D kraljica / dama (Д краљицa / дама)	queen / lady
Northern Sotho	Kg Kgošigadi	
Sicilian	D riggina	queen
Slovak	D dáma	lady
Slovene	D dama	lady
Spanish	D dama / reina	lady / queen
Swedish	D dam / drottning	lady / queen
Tamil	Q அரசி (araci)	queen
Telugu	మంత్రి (maṃtri)	minister
Thai	ต เม็ด / ตรี / มนตรี (met / tri / montri)	counselor
Turkish	V vezir	vizier
Ukrainian	Ф ферзь (ferz)	vizier
Urdu	وزیر (vazīr)	
Uzbek	Fz farzin	
Vietnamese	H hậu	queen
Welsh	B brenhines	queen

== Unicode ==
Unicode defines three codepoints for a queen:

♕ U+2655 White Chess Queen

♛ U+265B Black Chess Queen

🨁 U+1FA01 Neutral Chess Queen

== See also ==
- Amazon – queen+knight compound piece
- Eight queens puzzle
- Queen versus pawn endgame
- Queen's graph
- Staunton chess set
