= Francesc de Castellví i de Vic =

Spanish poet, noble and politician

Francesc de Castellví i de Vic (also Franci or Francisco de Castellví y Vic, died September 6, 1506) was a poet, nobleman, and politician from Valencia, Spain. He was the baron and lord of Benimuslem Mulata, and was an advisor in the court of King Ferdinand II of Aragon.

== Chess of Love ==
He is one of the authors of Scachs d'amor or Chess of Love, a poem based on a chess game and written in Valencian, where he (as Mars) took the White (red in the poem) pieces and checkmated Narcís Vinyoles (as Venus, taking black, or the green in the poem). Bernat Fenollar (as Mercury) comments and establishes the rules. It is the first documented game played with the modern rules of chess, at least concerning the moves of the queen and bishop.
