= Versus de scachis =

10th-century Medieval Latin chess poem

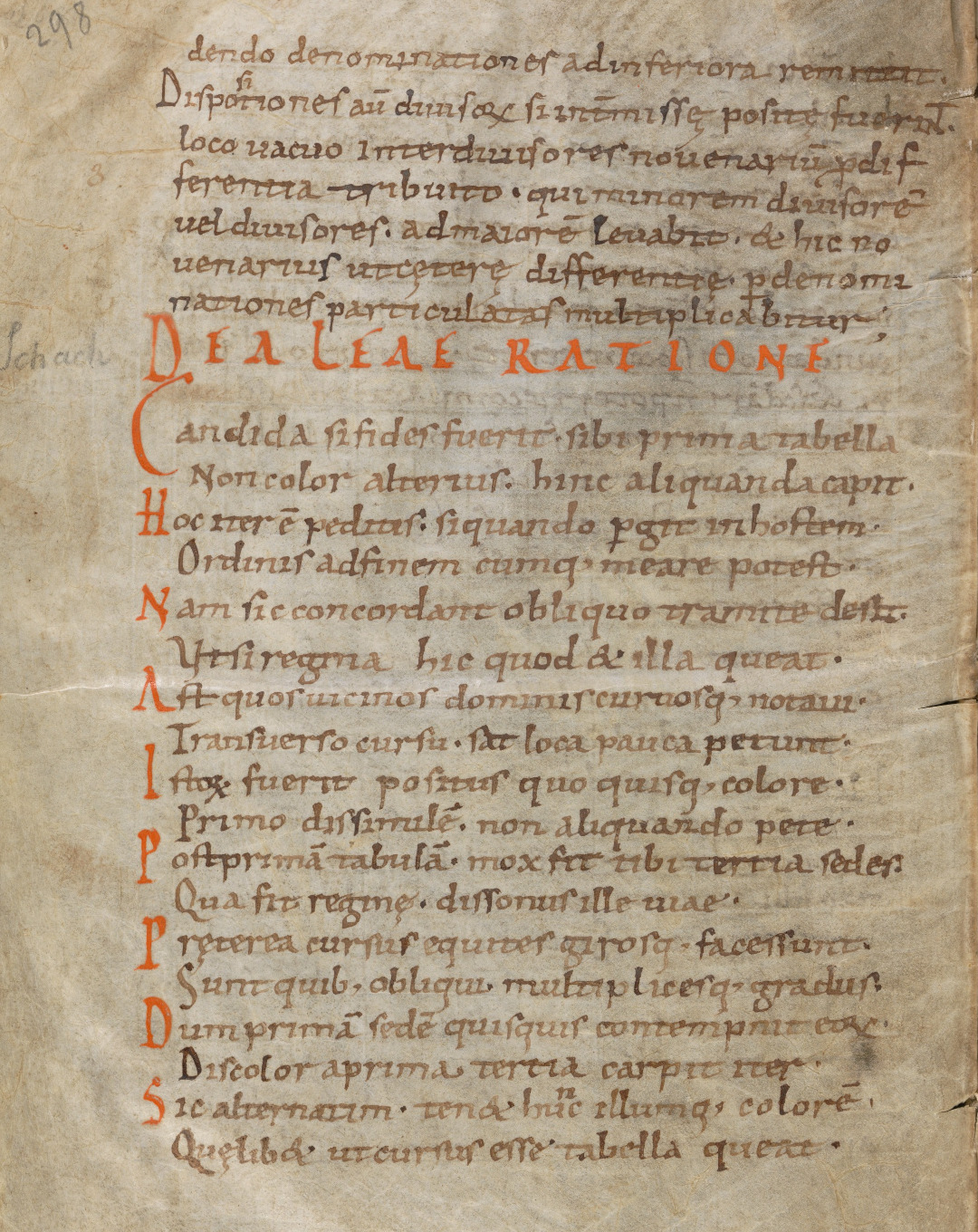
- Cod. Einsidlensis 319, p. 298
- Also known as: Einsiedeln Poem
- Author(s): Anonymous
- Compiled by: Gall Morel
- Language: Medieval Latin
- Date: 10th century
- Provenance: Einsiedeln Abbey, Switzerland
- Manuscript(s): Codex Einsidlensis 365 and Codex Einsiedeln 319
- Principal manuscript(s): Codex Einsidlensis 365
- Genre: Didactic poetry
- Verse form: Elegiac couplet
- Length: 98 lines
- Subject: Chess

Versus de scachis (Latin: "Verses on Chess"), also known as the Einsiedeln Poem in some literature, is the title given to a 10th-century Medieval Latin poem about chess. It is the first known European text to provide a technical description of chess for didactic purposes and it is considered a fundamental document to understand the development of chess in Europe.

== Background ==
It was found on two manuscripts (Codex Einsidlensis 365 and 319) from Einsiedeln Abbey Library (where they are also currently preserved) located in Einsiedeln, Canton of Schwyz, Switzerland and it was dated to about AD 1000. The dating of the document makes the poem the earliest known reference to chess in a European text, as well as the earliest known document to mention the chess queen (called regina in Latin), and the first reference to a bicolor board with dark and light colors (a pattern that was absent from boards in precursors such as Indian chaturanga and Perso-Arabic shatranj, both of which were single-color and were divided only by horizontal and vertical lines).

The poem occupies both written sides of a sheet, and was only extracted in 1839 by the then abbey archivist Gall Morel (1803–1872) who combined it together with other loose sheets to form a composite volume, catalogued in the abbey archives as "Einsiedeln 365". In 1877, professor and classical philologist Hermann Hagen (1844–1898) made the verses accessible to the general public in his medieval poetry compilation Carmina Medii Aevi Maximam Partem Inedita: Ex Bibliothecis Helveticis Collecta. In 1913, the English chess historian H. J. R. Murray (1868–1955) translated, printed, and interpreted the verses. However, it was not until 1954 that historian H.M. Gamer drew attention to their extraordinary historical importance. There exists, in addition, an early medieval copy (though not of the Codex Einsidlensis 365) of lines 65 to 98 with a somewhat more classical orthography, which is dated to 997 AD and is also preserved in the Einsiedeln Abbey Library.

The title of Versus de scachis is from Codex Einsidlensis 365. The poem most likely dates to the 10th century. Gamer (1954) argues that the text in Codex Einsidlensis 365 might date to shortly before AD 1000, and the one in Codex Einsidlensis 319 dates to about the same time, or possibly to a few years after AD 1000. The text in Codex Einsidlensis 319 is incomplete, and entitled De aleae ratione.

== Content ==
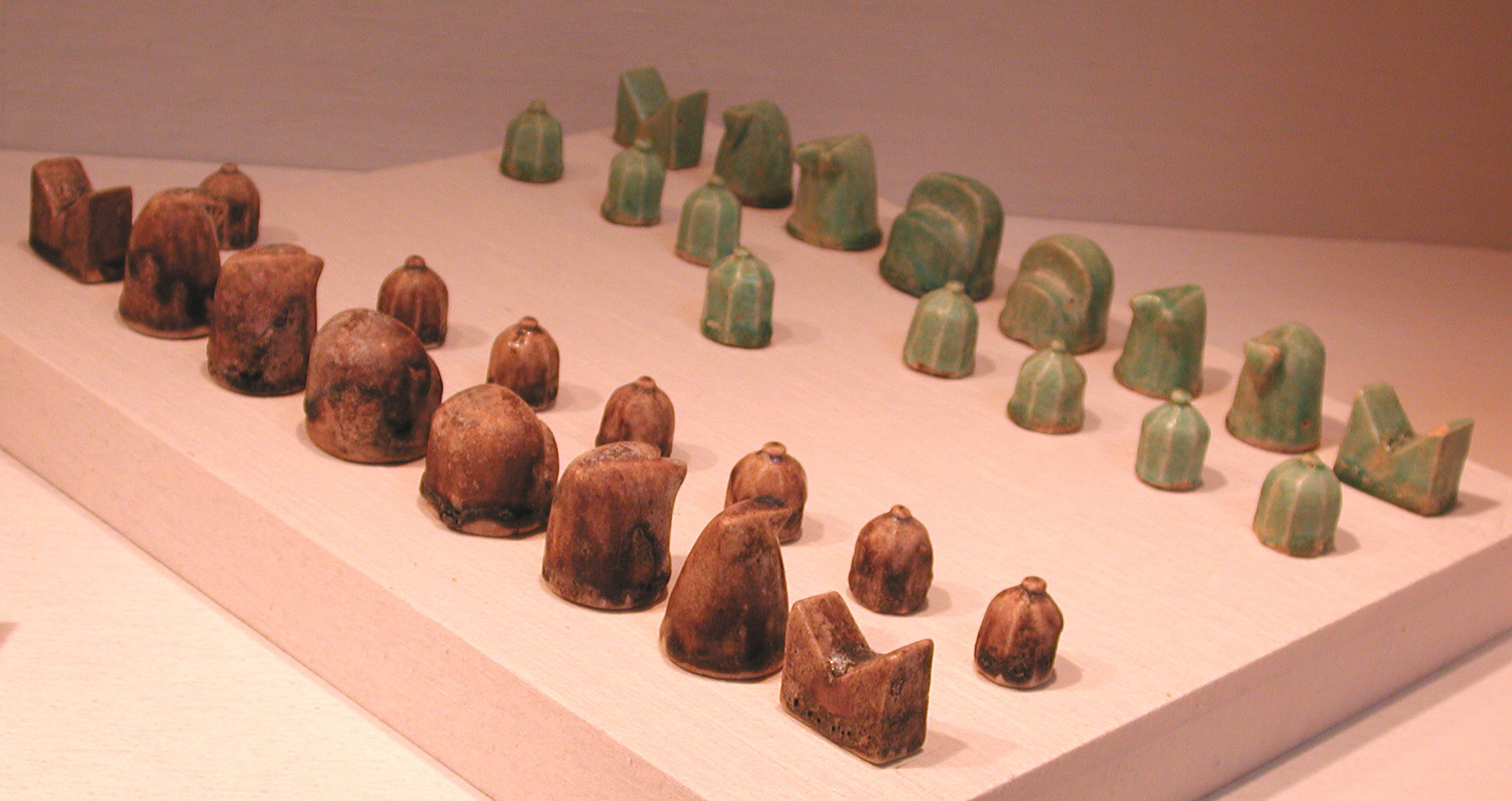
Iranian chess set of the 12th century, made of fritware.

The poem itself consists of 98 lines in elegiac couplets and written in Medieval Latin. The first ten verses justify the game as mental recreation, in which there is no malice (ne dollus ullus inest), no perjurious fraud, and no physical risk (non laceras corpus membra vel ulla tui), underlining also the advantage of playing without dice. Thus, the poem begins by expressing praise for the game of chess as a unique game that did not require gambling or dice. According to some chess historians, this initial statement was made in order to oppose common religious disapproval of games of chance that involved gambling.

In the next ten verses the alternative coloring of the squares on the board is mentioned for the first time, not yet in general use but used by some players (Sunt quibus has placuit duplici fucare colore) as a simple yet advantageous invention to better calculate the moves, besides giving players the ability to discover, more easily, mistakes or false moves. Between verses 21-44 the two sides, red and white (Pars hæc si candet, illa rubore nitet), are described, together with the pieces. The movement of the pieces as well as the main regulatory conditions of the game are near identical to shatranj (Perso-Arabic chess), except for the pawn-promotion rule. From the poetic descriptions of the pieces and their movements, it can be interpreted that the movements differ from modern chess and can be summarized as follows:

- Rex (king): Moves and captures on any adjacent square. Can never be captured, but when the King is under attack and surrounded so that he can not be defended or move to safety, the game is ended.
- Regina (queen): Moves and captures one square diagonally.
- Comes (meaning "count") or curvus: Moves and captures two squares diagonally. The name curvus means literally 'bent'; this may refer to its diagonal move, but it can also mean 'old man,' such as a king's adviser. The equivalent of the modern bishop.
- Æques (knight): Moves and captures via the 'knight's move', i.e. two steps in one direction and one to the side, so that it always ends on a different color.
- Rochus or marchio ("rook" or "marquess", respectively): Moves and captures vertically and horizontally as far as the player wishes. Mentioned as riding in chariots. Castling does not appear to exist.
- Pedes or pedites ("footsoldier", today's pawn): Can moves one square forward. He captures pieces that are one square diagonally in front. If he reaches the end of the board, the pawn can move like the Queen (i.e. move and capture diagonally one square in any direction), so long as the player's queen has been captured. There is no two-square first move and, thus, no en passant capture rule. Underpromotion also does not appear to exist.

According to chess historian H. J. R. Murray:

The most striking feature of this rather tedious poem is its freedom from Arabic terminology. The words check and mate are not used, and it is only the name of the game, scachi, in the title, and the word rochus that show that the writer is dealing with a game that is not of European invention. The nomenclature of the game is drawn from that of the state, and not from that of the army.

The terms Check, checkmate, chess and rook are all actually terms of Persian origin, but came into Europe via Arabic.

== See also ==
- History of chess
- Chess in early literature
- Scachs d'amor, a 15th-century Valencian poem containing the earliest documented chess game with the modern rules (i.e. queen and bishop movements)
