= Pedro Damiano =

Portuguese chess player (1480–1544)

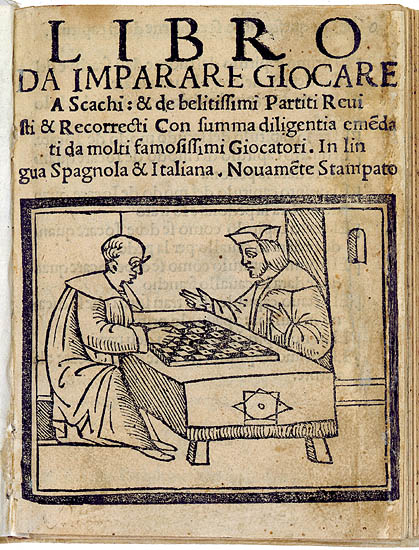

Personal information
- Born: Pedro Damião; 1480 Odemira, Portugal
- Died: 1544 (aged 63–64)

Chess career
- Country: Portugal

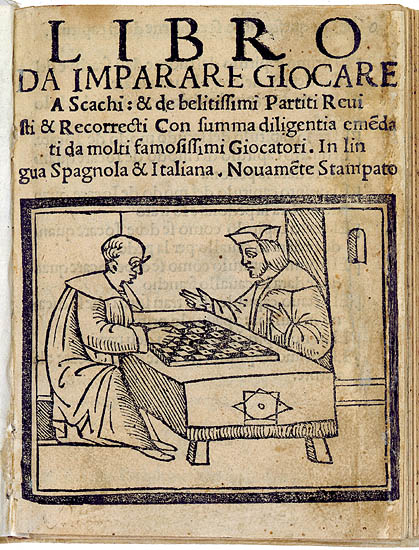
Front page of his book

Pedro Damiano (Portuguese: Pedro Damião; Damiano is the Italian form, much like the Latin Damianus; 1480–1544) was a Portuguese chess player. A native of Odemira, he was a pharmacist by profession. He wrote Questo libro e da imparare giocare a scachi et de li partiti, published in Rome, Italy, in 1512; it went through eight editions in the sixteenth century. Damiano describes the rules of the game, offers advice on strategy, presents a selection of chess problems (see diagrams), and provides analyses of a few openings. It is the oldest book that definitely states that the square on the right of the row closest to each player must be white. He also offers advice regarding blindfold chess, principally focused on the need to master notation based on numbering the squares 1–64 (Murray 1913, 788–89), a notation system which is common in the checkers family.

In this book Damiano suggested chess was invented by Xerxes, which would be why it was known in Portuguese as xadrez and in Spanish as ajedrez. In fact, these words come from Sanskrit chaturaṅga via Persian and Arabic šaṭranj.

The well-known chess aphorism "If you see a good move, try to find a better one", sometimes misattributed to Lasker and other writers, can be found in Damiano's book; similar sentiments were expressed by al-Suli regarding shatranj, the Persian precursor to chess.

According to the historian José Antonio Garzón, Damiano was a pseudonym, and his book was written by Francesc Vicent.

== Chess openings ==
In his opening analysis, Damiano suggested that after 1.e4 e5 2.Nf3 the reply 2...Nc6 is best and 2...d6 (now called the Philidor Defence) is not as good. He rightly condemned 2...f6 as clearly inferior, noting that White can play 3.Nxe5 with advantage; however, the opening later came to be known as the Damiano Defence. He stated that 1.e4 and 1.d4 are the only good first moves and that 1.e4 is better. He examined the Giuoco Piano, Petrov's Defence, and the Queen's Gambit Accepted.

== Chess problems ==
Position: a8 black king, b8 black rook, h8 black rook, a7 black pawn, e4 black queen, b2 white rook, f2 white queen, a1 white king, b1 white rook

White mates in three
Solution:
1.Qxa7+ Kxa7 2.Ra2+ Qa4 3.Rxa4#

Position: e8 black queen, f8 black rook, g8 black king, g7 black pawn, f6 black pawn, g6 white pawn, e2 white pawn, d1 white queen, f1 white rook, h1 white rook

White mates in five
Solution:
1.Rh8+ Kxh8 2.Rh1+ Kg8 3.Rh8+ Kxh8 4.Qh1+ Kg8 5.Qh7#

Position: d8 black rook, g8 black knight, h8 black king, g7 black pawn, h7 black pawn, g6 black queen, g5 white knight, h4 white queen

White mates in two
Solution:
1.Qxh7+ Qxh7 2.Nf7#
