= Narcís Vinyoles =

Spanish author, poet, politician and lawyer

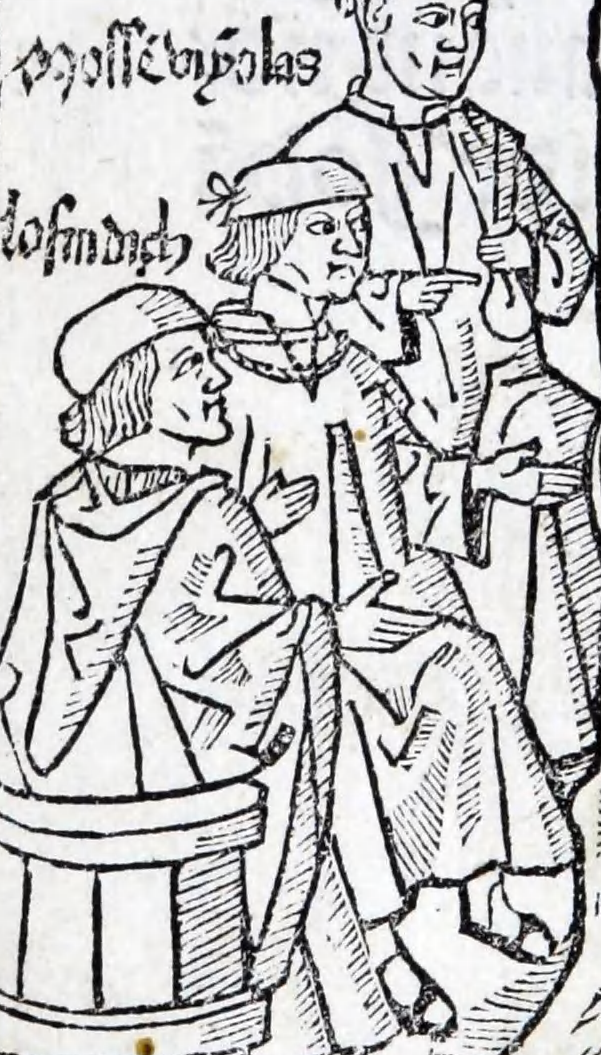
Vinyoles in a 1497 engraving

Narcís Vinyoles, also Narciso Viñoles (between 1442 and 1447 – 1517) was a poet, lawyer and politician from Valencia, Spain. He was twice appointed to the post of Justicia Civil, the supreme judge in civil cases, and in 1495, King Ferdinand II recommended him for Justicia Criminal. He was married to Brianda de Santángel, a niece of the banker Luis de Santángel who financed the voyage of Christopher Columbus.

Vinyoles was fluent in Catalan, Castilian Spanish, Latin, and Italian, even composing poems in Italian. Although he was a native Valencian/Catalan speaker, he praised the "clean, elegant, and graceful Castilian Spanish" and called his own native language "a barbaric tongue". For this, he has been reviled as "the first traitor to the Valencian country and language".

Vinyoles is one of the authors of Scachs d'amor or Chess of Love, a poem based on a chess game where he (as Venus) took the black (green in the poem) pieces and lost to Francesc de Castellví (as Mars, playing red, i.e. white), while Bernat Fenollar (as Mercury) comments and establishes the rules. It is the first documented game played with the modern rules of chess, at least concerning the moves of the queen and bishop.
