= Bożena Pytel =

Polish chess player

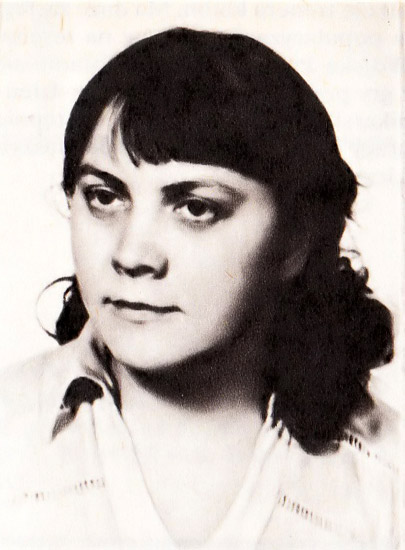

Personal information
- Born: 3 May 1945 (age 81) Lublin, Poland

Chess career
- Country: Poland / France
- Title: Woman International Master (1974)
- FIDE rating: 1854 (November 2018)
- Peak rating: 2115 (July 1993)

Bożena Pytel (née Ziemecka, born 3 May 1945) is a Polish chess player who won the Polish Women's Chess Championship in 1970. She received the FIDE title of Woman International Master (WIM) in 1974. Since 1989 she has played for France.

== Chess career ==
In the 1970s Bożena Pytel was one of the top Polish women's chess player. In 1966 she appeared for the first time in the Polish Women's Chess Championship's final. Bożena Pytel participated 10 times in the final tournaments and won three medals: gold (1970) and two bronze (1976, 1979). In the years 1970-1982 she won nine medals in Polish Team Chess Championships: two gold (1971, 1982), four silver (1970, 1974, 1979, 1980) and three bronze (1972, 1973, 1981). In 1973 Bożena Pytel played very successfully in an international women's chess tournament in Piotrków Trybunalski and shared first place.

Her husband Krzysztof Pytel, also a chess player, twice won the Polish Chess Championship (1972, 1973).
