= Chess in early literature =

One of the most common ways for chess historians to trace when the board game chess entered a country is to look at the literature of that country. Although due to the names associated with chess sometimes being used for more than one game (for instance Xiang-qi in China and Tables in England), the only certain reference to chess is often several hundred years later than uncertain earlier references. The following list contains the earliest references to chess or chess-like games.

== Byzantium ==
a. 923 – at-Tabari's Kitab akhbar ar-rusul wal-muluk (note the work is an Arabic work, no early Greek works are known)

== China ==
79 BC – 8 BC – lifetime of Liu Xiang 劉 向, who wrote Shuo yuan, a compilation of early Confucian anecdotes: "Do you still feel like playing xiangqi and dancing?". The rules of the game are not described in this text, so the ambiguity regarding which game it refers to is unresolved. "Xiangqi", apart from being the name of the chess variant played in China, has also been the name of two other unrelated games, and there is no scholarly consensus about it being a precursor to Chaturanga.

c. 900 AD – Huan Kwai Lu (Book of Marvels) Describes the rules of xiangqi.

== England ==
c. 1180 – Alexander Neckam's De Natura Rerum (note that it is thought that Neckam may have learnt of chess in Italy, not in England)

== France ==
a. 1127 – A song of Guilhem IX Count of Poitiers and Duke of Aquitaine.

== Germany ==
c. 1070 – Ruodlieb (IV 184–188) thought to be written by a monk near Tegernsee.

== India ==
c. 500 AD – Subandhu's Vasavadatta

The time of the rains played its game with frogs for chessmen which yellow and green in color, as if mottled by lac, leapt up on the black field squares.

c. 625 – Banabhatta's Harsha Charitha

Under this monarch, only the bees quarreled to collect the dew; the only feet cut off were those of measurements, and only from Ashtâpada one could learn how to draw up a Chaturanga, there were no cutting off the four limbs of condemned criminals...

c. 1030 – Al-Biruni's India describes the game of chaturaji.

1148 – Kalhana's Rajatarangini (translated by MA Stein, 1900)

The King, though he had taken two kings (Lothana and Vigraharaja) was helpless and perplexed about the attack on the remaining one, just as a player of chess (who has taken two Kings and is perplexed about taking a third).
(Note: This refers to the game of chaturaji.)

== Italy ==
c. 1061 or 1062 – Letter from Petrus Damiani (Cardinal Bishop of Ostia) to the Pope-elect Alexander II and the Archdeacon Hildebrand. This letter is dated by the reference to Alexander as "Pope-elect".

== Persia ==
c. 600 – Karnamak-i-Artakhshatr-i-Papakan

Artakhshir did this, and by God's help he became doughtier and more skilled than them all in ball-play, in horsemanship, in chess, in hunting and in all other accomplishments.

(It is fairly certain chess is meant due to the word shatranj being used).

== Russia ==
13th century – Kormchaya Kniga, a set of church laws.

== Spain ==
c. 1007 or 1008 – will of Ermengol I (Count of Urgell)

I order you, my executors, to give . . . these my chessmen to the convent of St. Giles, for the work of the church.

== Sumatra ==
c. 1620 – Sejarah Malayu

Now this Tan Bahra was a very skillful chessplayer, and one that was unequalled at the game in that age, and he played at chess with the men of Malacca.

== Switzerland ==
c. 997 – Versus de scachis in manuscript 319 at Stiftsbibliothek Einsiedeln: A didactic poem written in Medieval Latin where the first reference to chess in a European text can be found, as well as the first mention of a checkerboard and a queen.

== See also ==
- History of chess
- Timeline of chess
