= Bernat Fenollar =

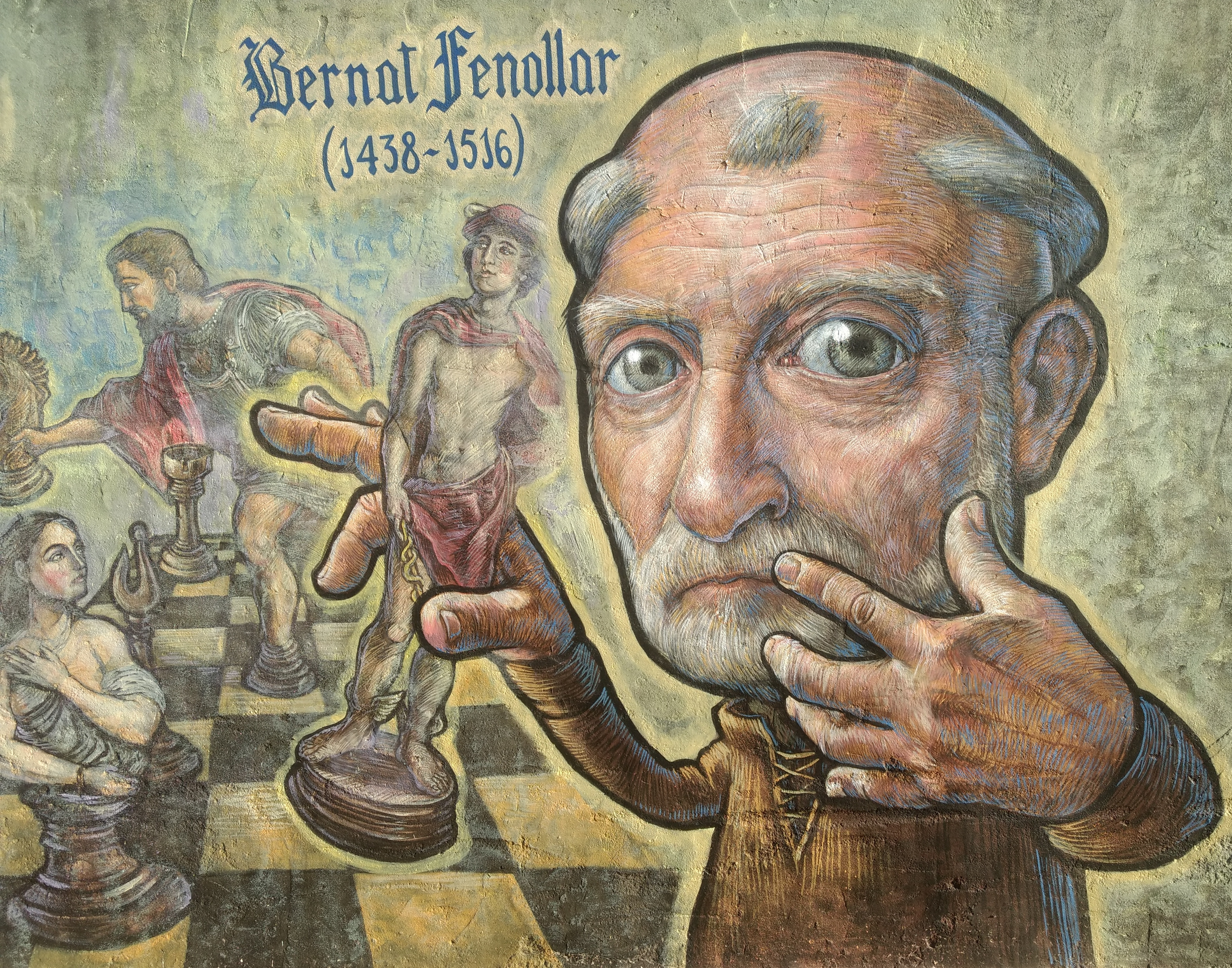
- Bernat Fenollar on the "Passeig de Batà de Muro" (summer 2017)
- Born: 1438; Penàguila, Kingdom of Valencia
- Died: February 28, 1516 (aged 77–78); Valencia, Kingdom of Valencia
- Other names: Mossèn (Bernat de) Fenollar
- Occupations: cleric, math professor, poet and chess player

Bernat Fenollar, also Mossèn (Bernat de) Fenollar (Penàguila, Valencian Community, 1438 – Valencia, 28 February 1516) was a poet, cleric and chess player from Valencia, Spain. He was an abbot (the title "Mossèn" was often given to clergymen), had a position both in Valencia Cathedral and the University of Valencia as a professor of mathematics.

== Works ==
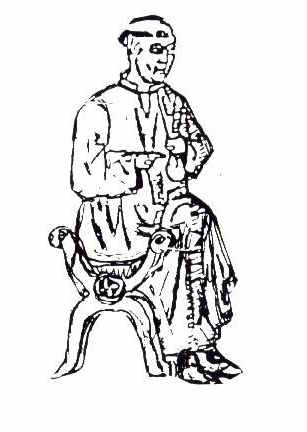
Xylography of Bernat Fenollar

=== Scachs d'amor ===
He is one of the authors of Scachs d'amor or Chess of Love, a poem based on a chess game between Francesc de Castellví and Narcís Vinyoles, while Bernat Fenollar comments and establishes the rules. It is the first documented game played with the modern rules of chess, at least concerning the moves of the queen and bishop.

=== Selected works ===
- Història de la passió de N.S. Jesu Christi en cobles, Valencia: 1493 (in Catalan)
- Lo procés de les olives, Valencia: 1497 (in Catalan)
- Les trobes en lahors de la Verge Maria, Valencia: 1974 (in English), ISBN 9788450065886
- The poem Scachs d'amor (1475), Murcia: 2015 (in English), ISBN 9781326374914
