= Krzysztof Pytel =

Polish chess player (1945–2019)

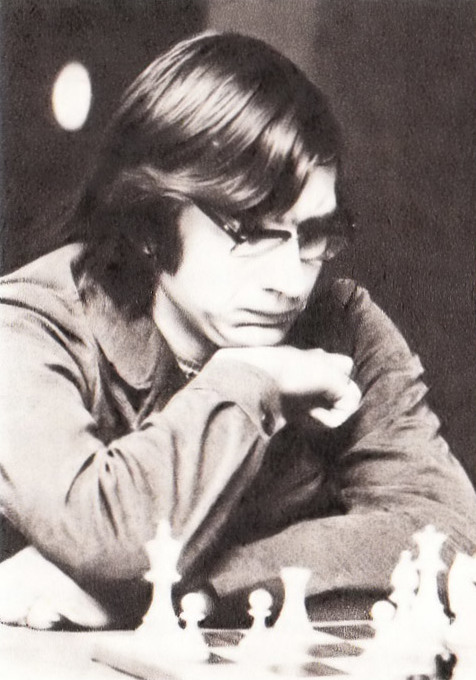
- Pytel in 1987

Personal information
- Born: 15 May 1945 Chełm, Poland
- Died: 30 June 2019 (aged 74)

Chess career
- Country: Poland; France
- Title: International Master (1975)
- Peak rating: 2500 (July 1994)

Krzysztof Pytel (15 May 1945 – 30 June 2019) was a Polish chess player who twice won the Polish Chess Championship (1972, 1973). He received the FIDE title on International Master (IM) in 1975. After 1989 he played for France.

== Chess career ==
He started playing chess at the age of ten. In 1964 and 1965 Pytel twice won Polish Junior Chess Championship. Pytel was a good correspondence chess player - in 1966 he won the Polish Championship in correspondence chess, and in 1968 won a silver medal in this tournament. From 1968 to 1985 Pytel played thirteen times in the Polish Chess Championship's finals, winning three medals: two gold (1972, 1973) and one silver (1979). In the years 1966-1982 he won ten medals in Polish Team Chess Championships, including two gold (1966, 1982).

In 1972 Pytel qualified for the World Chess Championship zonal tournament in Vrnjačka Banja, but his trip to the tournament was cancelled due to the ongoing smallpox epidemic in Yugoslavia. He was awarded the International Master title in 1976.

Krzysztof Pytel played for Poland in Chess Olympiads:

- In 1972, at third board in the 20th Chess Olympiad in Skopje (+2, =10, -3),
- In 1974, at third board in the 21st Chess Olympiad in Nice (+5, =11, -2),
- In 1978, at reserve board in the 23rd Chess Olympiad in Buenos Aires (+1, =4, -3),
- In 1984, at third board in the 26th Chess Olympiad in Thessaloniki (+0, =2, -2).

Krzysztof Pytel played for Poland in European Team Chess Championship:

- In 1973, at second board in the 5th European Team Chess Championship in Bath (+1, =6, -0).

Krzysztof Pytel was a chess trainer and journalist, and author of many books on chess. Since 1989 he has played for France, where he lived until his death, and where he trained children and young people. His wife Bożena Pytel was also a chess player: she won the Polish Women's Chess Championship in 1970.
