= Cubic chess =

Variant of chess

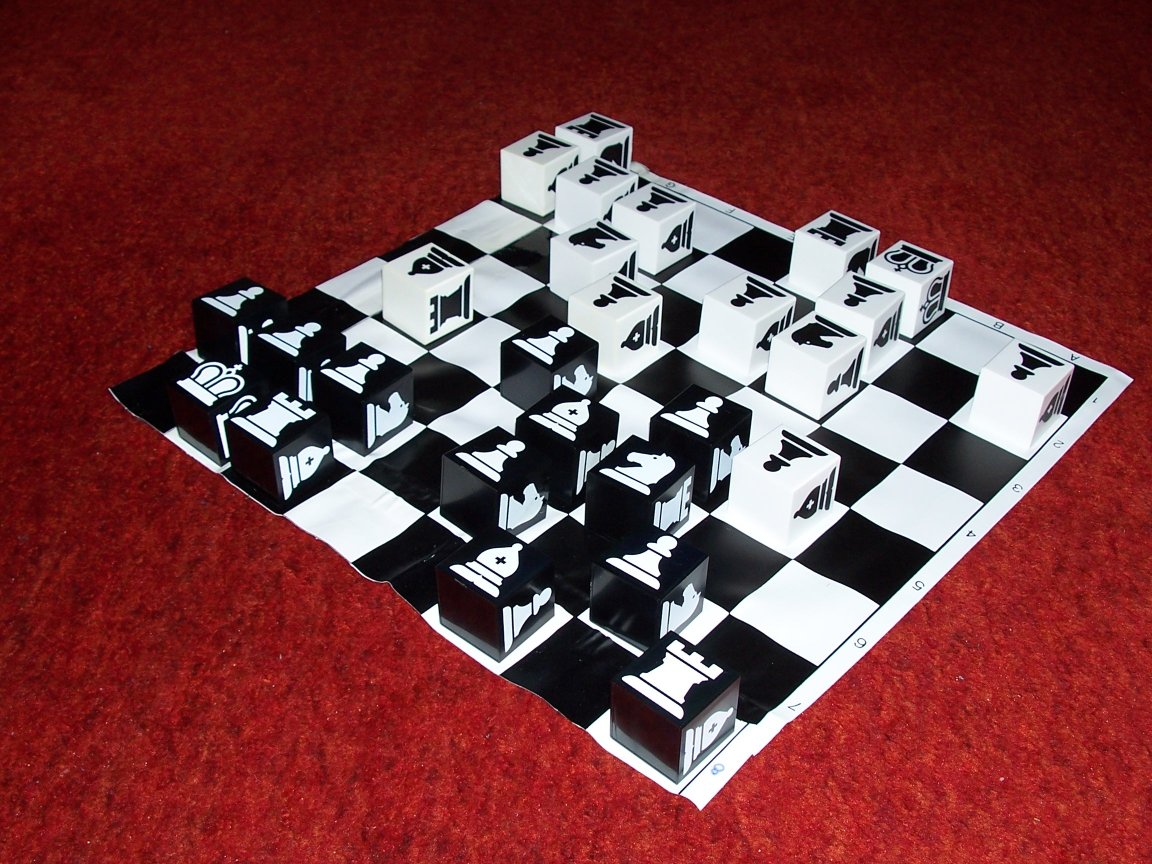
- A cubic chess game in progress
- Designers: Vladimír Pribylinec
- Years active: Current rules since 2008
- Genres: Abstract strategy game; Chess variant
- Players: 2
- Setup time: < 1 min.
- Playing time: Casual games usually 10–60 mins.
- Chance: None
- Skills: Strategy, tactics
- Synonyms: Echos

Cubic chess is a chess variant invented by Vladimír Pribylinec beginning with an early version (named Echos) in 1977. The game substitutes cubes for the chess pieces, where four of the faces of each cube display a different chess piece (pawn, knight, bishop and rook), the two other faces are blank and are oriented to the players. This provides an efficient means (rotating the cube on a square) to change a piece's type. Kings and queens have unique cubes containing only their symbol, effectively behaving as normal.

The game begins like standard chess, with a normal 8×8 chessboard, and cubes rotated so that uppermost faces reflect the standard chess starting position.

== Game rules ==
Cubic chess follows the normal rules of chess (including castling, check, checkmate, etc.), but with the following special differences:

- Non-pawn pieces that become captured, are retained by the capturer—unrotated—into off-board "stock".
- For their turn, a player may either:
  - make a normal chess move using one of the pieces already on the board; or
  - rotate any pawn such that uppermost on the player's cube is any piece type contained in the player's "stock". A corresponding piece in the stock is immediately removed from the game.

== Sample game ==
Note on notation: When a pawn is rotated to display a new piece type, the new piece is written in parentheses, for example: 6...h7(B).

1.e4 e5 2.f4 exf4 3.Nf3 d5 4.e5 Bg4 5.d4 Nc6 6.Bb5 Bxf3 7.Qxf3 a7(N) 8.Bxc6 Nxc6 9.c3 d5(B) 10.Qf2 Rxa2 11.Rxa2 Bxa2 12.Nd2 h7(R) 13.h3 Be7 14.0-0 f3 15.Qxf3 Bd5 16.Ne4 Rh4 17.Nd6+ Bxd6 18.Qxd5 Nf6 19.Qf3 Bxe5 20.Re1 Nxd4 21.Rxe5 Kf8 22.cxd4 f7(N) 23.Be3 Nxe5 24.dxe5 b7(R) 25.exf6 gxf6 26.Bf2 Ra4 27.g2(R) Ra1+ 28.Kh2 Rxb2 29.Qg4 Qd6+ 30.Bg3 Rxg2 31.Kxg2 Qd2+ 32.Kf3 Ra3+ 33.Ke4 Ra4+ 34.Kf5 Qd5+ 35.Kxf6 Rxg4 36.hxg4 Rh6++

== See also ==
- Crazyhouse
- Cubic Shogi – a shogi variant by Vladimír Pribylinec
