= Sho shogi =

Shō shōgi (小将棋 'small chess') is a 16th-century form of shogi (Japanese chess), and the immediate predecessor of the modern game. It is played on a 9×9 board with the same setup as in modern shogi, except that an extra piece is placed in front of the king: a 'drunk elephant' that promoted into a prince, which acts like a second king. According to the Sho Shōgi Zushiki, the drunk elephant was eliminated by the Emperor Go-Nara (reigned 1526–1557), and it is assumed that the drop rule was introduced at about the same time, giving rise to shogi as it is known today.

== Rules of the game ==
=== Objective ===
The objective of the game is to capture your opponent's king and crown prince (if present) or all other pieces.

=== Game equipment ===
Two players, Black and White (or 先手 sente and 後手 gote), play on a board ruled into a grid of 9 ranks (rows) by 9 files (columns). The squares are undifferentiated by marking or color.

Each player has a set of 21 wedge-shaped pieces, of slightly different sizes. From largest to smallest (most to least powerful) they are:

- 1 king
- 1 drunken elephant
- 1 rook
- 1 bishop
- 2 gold generals
- 2 silver generals
- 2 knights
- 2 lances
- 9 pawns

Most of the English names were chosen to correspond to rough equivalents in Western chess, rather than as translations of the Japanese names.

Each piece has its name in the form of two kanji written on its face. On the reverse side of some pieces are two other characters, often in a different color (commonly red instead of black); this reverse side is turned up to indicate that the piece has been promoted during play. The pieces of the two sides do not differ in color, but instead each piece is shaped like a wedge, and faces forward, toward the opposing side. This shows who controls the piece during play.

==== Table of pieces ====
Listed here are the pieces of the game with their Japanese representation:

| Piece | Kanji | Rōmaji | Abr. | Meaning |
|---|---|---|---|---|
| King (reigning) | 王将 | ōshō | 王 | royal general |
| King (challenging) | 玉将 | gyokushō | 玉 | jade general |
| Drunken elephant | 酔象 | suizō | 酔 | drunken elephant |
| Crown prince | 太子 | taishi | 太 | crown prince |
| Rook | 飛車 | hisha | 飛 | flying chariot |
| Promoted rook | 竜王 | ryūō | 竜 | dragon king |
| Bishop | 角行 | kakugyō | 角 | angle mover |
| Promoted bishop | 竜馬 | ryūma | 馬 | dragon horse |
| Gold general | 金将 | kinshō | 金 | gold general |
| Silver general | 銀将 | ginshō | 銀 | silver general |
| Promoted silver | 成銀 | narigin | 全 | promoted silver |
| Knight | 桂馬 | keima | 桂 | laureled horse |
| Promoted knight | 成桂 | narikei | 圭 | promoted laurel |
| Lance | 香車 | kyōsha | 香 | incense chariot |
| Promoted lance | 成香 | narikyō | 杏 | promoted incense |
| Pawn | 歩兵 | fuhyō | 歩 | foot soldier |
| Promoted pawn | と金 | tokin | と | reaches gold |

English speakers sometimes refer to promoted bishops as horses and promoted rooks as dragons, after their Japanese names, and generally use the Japanese name tokin for promoted pawns. Silver generals and gold generals are commonly referred to simply as silvers and golds.

The characters inscribed on the backs of the pieces to indicate promoted rank may be in red ink, and are usually cursive. The characters on the backs of the pieces that promote to gold generals are cursive versions of 金 'gold', becoming more cursive (more abbreviated) as the value of the original piece decreases. These abbreviated characters have these equivalents in print: 全 for promoted silver, 今 for promoted knight, 仝 for promoted lance, and 个 for promoted pawn (tokin). Another convention has abbreviated versions of the original characters, with a reduced number of strokes: 圭 for promoted knight, 杏 for promoted lance, with promoted silver the same 全 as above, and と for tokin.

=== Setup ===
| 9 | 8 | 7 | 6 | 5 | 4 | 3 | 2 | 1 |
|---|---|---|---|---|---|---|---|---|---|
| 香 車 | 桂 馬 | 銀 将 | 金 将 | 王 将 | 金 将 | 銀 将 | 桂 馬 | 香 車 | 一 |
| | 飛 車 | | | 酔 象 | | | 角 行 | | 二 |
| 歩 兵 | 歩 兵 | 歩 兵 | 歩 兵 | 歩 兵 | 歩 兵 | 歩 兵 | 歩 兵 | 歩 兵 | 三 |
| | | | | | | | | | 四 |
| | | | | | | | | | 五 |
| | | | | | | | | | 六 |
| 歩 兵 | 歩 兵 | 歩 兵 | 歩 兵 | 歩 兵 | 歩 兵 | 歩 兵 | 歩 兵 | 歩 兵 | 七 |
| | 角 行 | | | 酔 象 | | | 飛 車 | | 八 |
| 香 車 | 桂 馬 | 銀 将 | 金 将 | 玉 将 | 金 将 | 銀 将 | 桂 馬 | 香 車 | 九 |

| 9 | 8 | 7 | 6 | 5 | 4 | 3 | 2 | 1 |
|---|---|---|---|---|---|---|---|---|---|
| L | N | S | G | K | G | S | N | L | a |
| | R | | | DE | | | B | | b |
| P | P | P | P | P | P | P | P | P | c |
| | | | | | | | | | d |
| | | | | | | | | | e |
| | | | | | | | | | f |
| P | P | P | P | P | P | P | P | P | g |
| | B | | | DE | | | R | | h |
| L | N | S | G | K | G | S | N | L | i |

Each side places his pieces in the positions shown below, pointing toward the opponent.

- In the rank nearest the player:
  - The king is placed in the center file.
  - The two gold generals are placed in the adjacent files to the king.
  - The two silver generals are placed adjacent to each gold general.
  - The two knights are placed adjacent to each silver general.
  - The two lances are placed in the corners, adjacent to each knight.

That is, the first rank is |L|N|S|G|K|G|S|N|L|.

- In the second rank, each player places:
  - The bishop in the same file as the knight on the player's left.
  - The rook in the same file as the knight on the player's right.
  - The drunken elephant in the same file as the king.
- In the third rank, the nine pawns are placed one in each file.

=== Game play ===
The players alternate making a move, with Black moving first. (The traditional chess terms 'black' and 'white' are used to differentiate the sides during discussion of the game in English, but are not literally descriptive. In Japanese, the side moving first is referred to as 先手 sente, and the second player is referred to as 後手 gote.) A move consists of moving a single piece on the board and potentially promoting that piece or displacing (capturing) an opposing piece. Each of these options is detailed below.

=== Movement and capture ===
An opposing piece is captured by displacement: That is, if a piece moves to a square occupied by an opposing piece, the opposing piece is displaced and removed from the board. A piece cannot move to a square occupied by a friendly piece (meaning another piece controlled by the moving player).

Each piece on the game moves in a characteristic pattern. Pieces move either orthogonally (that is, forward, backward, left, or right, in the direction of one of the arms of a plus sign, +), or diagonally (in the direction of one of the arms of a multiplication sign, ×). The knight is an exception in that it does not move in a straight line.

If a lance or pawn, pieces that cannot retreat or move aside, advances across the board until it can no longer move, it must promote.

Some pieces are capable of several kinds of movement, with the type of movement most often depending on the direction in which they move. The movement categories are:

==== Step movers ====
Some pieces move only one square at a time. (If a friendly piece occupies an adjacent square, the moving piece may not move in that direction; if an opposing piece is there, it may be displaced and captured.)

The step movers are the king, drunken elephant, gold general, silver general and the 9 pawns on each side.

==== Jumping piece ====
The knight can jump; that is, it can pass over any intervening piece, whether friend or foe, with no effect on either.

==== Ranging piece ====
The bishop and rook can move any number of empty squares along a straight line, limited only by the edge of the board. If an opposing piece intervenes, it may be captured by moving to that square and removing it from the board. A ranging piece must stop where it captures, and cannot bypass a piece that is in its way. If a friendly piece intervenes, the moving piece is limited to a distance that stops short of the intervening piece; if the friendly piece is adjacent, it cannot move in that direction at all.

=== Promotion ===
A player's promotion zone consists of the three farthest ranks, at the original line of the opponent's pawns and beyond (that is, the opponent's territory at setup). If a piece crosses the board within the promotion zone, including moves into, out of, or wholly within the zone, then that player may choose to promote the piece at the end of the turn. Promotion is effected by turning the piece over after it moves, revealing the name of its promoted rank.

Promoting a piece has the effect of changing how that piece moves until it is removed from the board. Each piece promotes as follows:

- A king or a gold general cannot promote, nor can pieces which are already promoted.
- A silver general, knight, lance or pawn, when promoted, loses its normal movement and gains the movement of a gold general.
- A drunken elephant, bishop or rook, when promoted, keeps its normal movement and gains the ability to move one square in any direction (like a king). This means the bishop is now able to reach any square on the board, given enough moves.

If a pawn, knight or lance reaches the farthest rank, it must be promoted, since it would otherwise have no legal move on subsequent turns.

=== Individual pieces ===
Below are diagrams indicating each piece's movement. Pieces are paired with their promotion. Pieces with a grey heading start out in the game; those with a blue heading only appear on the board after promotion. Betza's funny notation has been included in brackets for easier reference.

Notation
| ○ | Steps to an adjacent square |
| ☆ | Jumps to a non-adjacent square, bypassing any intervening piece |
| │ | Ranges along a straight line, crossing any number of empty squares |
| ─ | Ranges along a straight line, crossing any number of empty squares |
| ╲ | Ranges along a straight line, crossing any number of empty squares |
| ╱ | Ranges along a straight line, crossing any number of empty squares |

King

Step: The king can step one square in any direction, orthogonal or diagonal. The challenger takes the jade general. (K)

| ○ | ○ | ○ |
| ○ | 王 | ○ |
| ○ | ○ | ○ |

The king does not promote.
Drunken Elephant
Crown Prince
Step: The drunken elephant can step one square in any direction, orthogonal or diagonal, except directly backward. (FfrlW)

| ○ | ○ | ○ |
| ○ | 酔 | ○ |
| ○ | | ○ |

Step: The crown prince can step one square in any direction, orthogonal or diagonal. (K)

The crown prince effectively doubles as a second king, and must also be captured to win if present.

| ○ | ○ | ○ |
| ○ | 太 | ○ |
| ○ | ○ | ○ |

Rook
Dragon King
Range: The rook can move any number of free squares along any of the four orthogonal directions. (R)

| | | │ | | |
| | | │ | | |
| ─ | ─ | 飛 | ─ | ─ |
| | | │ | | |
| | | │ | | |

Range: The dragon king can move any number of free squares along any of the four orthogonal directions.

Step: It can move one square in any diagonal direction. (FR)

| | | │ | | |
| | ○ | │ | ○ | |
| ─ | ─ | 龍 | ─ | ─ |
| | ○ | │ | ○ | |
| | | │ | | |

Bishop
Dragon Horse
Range: The bishop can move any number of free squares along any of the four diagonal directions. (B)

Because it cannot move orthogonally, an unpromoted bishop can only reach half the squares on the board.

| ╲ | | | | ╱ |
| | ╲ | | ╱ | |
| | | 角 | | |
| | ╱ | | ╲ | |
| ╱ | | | | ╲ |

Range: The dragon horse can move any number of free squares along any of the four diagonal directions.

Step: It can move one square in any orthogonal direction. (WB)

| ╲ | | | | ╱ |
| | ╲ | ○ | ╱ | |
| | ○ | 馬 | ○ | |
| | ╱ | ○ | ╲ | |
| ╱ | | | | ╲ |

Gold General

Step: The gold general can step one square in one of the four orthogonal directions; or, one square diagonally forward, giving it six possibilities. (WfF)

| ○ | ○ | ○ |
| ○ | 金 | ○ |
| | ○ | |

The gold general does not promote.
Silver General
Promoted Silver General
Step: The silver general can step one square in one of the four diagonal directions; or, one square straight forward, giving it five possibilities. (FfW)

| ○ | ○ | ○ |
| | 銀 | |
| ○ | | ○ |

Step: The promoted silver general can step one square in one of the four orthogonal directions; or, one square diagonally forward, giving it six possibilities. (WfF)

| ○ | ○ | ○ |
| ○ | 全 | ○ |
| | ○ | |

Knight
Promoted Knight
Jump: The knight jumps at an angle intermediate between orthogonal and diagonal, amounting to one square forward plus one square diagonally forward, in a single motion, ignoring any intervening piece. That is, it has a choice of two forward destinations. (ffN)

A knight that reaches the two farthest ranks must promote.

| ☆ | | ☆ |
| | 桂 | |

Step: The promoted knight can step one square in one of the four orthogonal directions; or, one square diagonally forward, giving it six possibilities. (WfF)

| ○ | ○ | ○ |
| ○ | 圭 | ○ |
| | ○ | |

Lance
Promoted Lance
Range: The lance can move any number of free squares straight forward. (fR)

A lance that reaches the farthest rank must promote.

| │ |
| │ |
| 香 |

Step: The promoted lance can step one square in one of the four orthogonal directions; or, one square diagonally forward, giving it six possibilities. (WfF)

| ○ | ○ | ○ |
| ○ | 杏 | ○ |
| | ○ | |

Pawn
Tokin
Step: The pawn can step one square forward. (fW)

A pawn that reaches the farthest rank must promote.

| ○ |
| 歩 |

Step: The tokin can step one square in one of the four orthogonal directions; or, one square diagonally forward, giving it six possibilities. (WfF)

| ○ | ○ | ○ |
| ○ | と | ○ |
| | ○ | |

=== Check and mate ===
When a player makes a move such that the opponent's king or crown prince could be captured on the following move, the move is said to give check to the king or crown prince; the king or crown prince is said to be in check. If a player's king or crown prince (sole one in play) is in check and no legal move by that player will get the king or crown prince out of check, the checking move is also mate, and can effectively win the game.

A player is not allowed to give perpetual check.

=== Game end ===
A player who captures the opponent's king and crown prince (if present) wins the game, as does a player who captures everything else, leaving a "bare" (or lone) king or crown prince. In practice this rarely happens, as a player will resign when checkmated, as otherwise when loss is inevitable.

A player who makes an illegal move loses immediately. (This rule may be relaxed in casual games.)

There is one other possible (but fairly uncommon) ways for a game to end: repetition (千日手 sennichite). If the same position occurs four times with the same player to play, then the game is no contest. (Recall, however, the prohibition against perpetual check.)

== Game notation ==
The method used in English-language texts to express shogi moves was established by George Hodges in 1976. It is derived from the algebraic notation used for chess, but differs in several respects.

A typical example is P-8f. The first letter represents the piece moved: P = pawn, L = lance, N = knight, S = silver, G = gold, B = bishop, R = rook, DE = drunken elephant, K = king. Promoted pieces have a + added in front of the letter. e.g., +P for a tokin (promoted pawn). The designation of the piece is followed by a symbol indicating the type of move: - for an ordinary move and x for a capture. Next is the designation for the square on which the piece lands. This consists of a number representing the file and a lowercase letter representing the rank, with 1a being the top right corner (as seen from Black's point of view) and 9i being the bottom left corner. (This method of designating squares is based on Japanese convention, which, however, uses Japanese numerals instead of letters. For example, the square 2c is denoted by 2三 in Japanese.)

If a move entitles the player to promote the piece, then a + is added to the end to signify that the promotion was taken, or an = to indicate that it was declined. For example, Nx7c= indicates a knight capturing on 7c without promoting.

In cases where the above notation would be ambiguous, the designation of the start square is added after the designation for the piece in order to make clear which piece is meant.

Moves are commonly numbered as in chess. For example, the start of a game might look like this:

    1. P-7f   P-3d
    2. P-2f   G-3b
    3. P-2e   Bx8h+
    4. Sx8h   S-2b

== See also ==
- Shogi variant
- Heian shogi
