= EuroShogi =

Shogi variant invented by Vladimír Pribylinec starting in 2000

Position: b8 black knight, c8 black bishop, d8 black queen, e8 black king, f8 black queen, g8 black knight, b7 black rook, g7 black bishop, a6 black pawn, b6 black pawn, c6 black pawn, d6 black pawn, e6 black pawn, f6 black pawn, g6 black pawn, h6 black pawn, a3 white pawn, b3 white pawn, c3 white pawn, d3 white pawn, e3 white pawn, f3 white pawn, g3 white pawn, h3 white pawn, b2 white bishop, g2 white rook, b1 white knight, c1 white queen, d1 white king, e1 white queen, f1 white bishop, g1 white knight
EuroShogi starting position. For this diagram, generals are represented by queens.
- Designers: Vladimír Pribylinec
- Genres: Abstract strategy game Shogi variant
- Players: 2
- Setup time: ~1 min.
- Playing time: Casual games usually 10–60 mins.
- Chance: None
- Skills: Strategy, tactics

EuroShogi is a shogi variant invented by Vladimír Pribylinec starting in 2000. The game developed from an early version of chess variant Echos in 1977, leading to Cubic Chess, then later to Cubic Shogi, and finally to EuroShogi. Instead of the classic figures, 18 black and 18 white cubes are used, which are on two opposing sides without symbols. The other two cubes on the opposite sides have one white and one black symbol. The other opposing sides are the same symbols of the opposite color - their promotion is indicated by a circle around symbol. Symbol on top of its mobility. The pieces are placed on the board so that they are oriented towards players without any symbolic surfaces. Plays on a board with 8x8 fields of the same color.

A major tenet of EuroShogi is simplification without radical changes, while maintaining good gameplay. The variant Heian shogi with playing board 8×8 or 9×8 is the only shogi variant somewhat similar to EuroShogi; other variants are larger or smaller, have new units, or lack drops.

== Game rules ==
On the board the furthest three ranks from each player is their promotion zone. The starting setup is as shown. Pieces capture the same as they move.

Composition of pieces per player: 1 king, 1 rook, 2 bishops, 2 generals, 2 knights, 8 pawns.

=== Movement ===
==== King ====
The king steps one square in any direction, orthogonal or diagonal. It does not promote.

a5	b5	c5	d5	e5
a4	b4 black circle	c4 black circle	d4 black circle	e4
a3	b3 black circle	c3 black king	d3 black circle	e3
a2	b2 black circle	c2 black circle	d2 black circle	e2
a1	b1	c1	d1	e1

==== Rook ====
The rook moves any number of unoccupied squares along any of the four orthogonal directions. When promoted, it gains the ability to move one square diagonally.

a5	b5	c5 up arrow	d5	e5
a4	b4	c4 up arrow	d4	e4
a3 left arrow	b3 left arrow	c3 black rook	d3 right arrow	e3 right arrow
a2	b2	c2 down arrow	d2	e2
a1	b1	c1 down arrow	d1	e1

Before promotion

a5	b5	c5 up arrow	d5	e5
a4	b4 black circle	c4 up arrow	d4 black circle	e4
a3 left arrow	b3 left arrow	c3 black rook	d3 right arrow	e3 right arrow
a2	b2 black circle	c2 down arrow	d2 black circle	e2
a1	b1	c1 down arrow	d1	e1

After promotion

==== Bishop ====
The bishop moves any number of unoccupied squares along any of the four diagonal directions. When promoted, it gains the ability to move one square orthogonally.

a5 up-left arrow	b5	c5	d5	e5 up-right arrow
a4	b4 up-left arrow	c4	d4 up-right arrow	e4
a3	b3	c3 black bishop	d3	e3
a2	b2 down-left arrow	c2	d2 down-right arrow	e2
a1 down-left arrow	b1	c1	d1	e1 down-right arrow

Before promotion

a5 up-left arrow	b5	c5	d5	e5 up-right arrow
a4	b4 up-left arrow	c4 black circle	d4 up-right arrow	e4
a3	b3 black circle	c3 black bishop	d3 black circle	e3
a2	b2 down-left arrow	c2 black circle	d2 down-right arrow	e2
a1 down-left arrow	b1	c1	d1	e1 down-right arrow

After promotion

==== General ====
The general moves one square in every direction except diagonally backwards. It does not promote.

a5	b5	c5	d5	e5
a4	b4 white circle	c4 white circle	d4 white circle	e4
a3	b3 white circle	c3 white queen	d3 white circle	e3
a2	b2	c2 white circle	d2	e2
a1	b1	c1	d1	e1

Light

a5	b5	c5	d5	e5
a4	b4	c4 black circle	d4	e4
a3	b3 black circle	c3 black queen	d3 black circle	e3
a2	b2 black circle	c2 black circle	d2 black circle	e2
a1	b1	c1	d1	e1

Dark

==== Knight ====
The knight jumps at an angle intermediate to orthogonal and diagonal, equivalent to: one square frontal forward, then one square diagonally forward, in a single move. The knight leaps over any intervening men. It can also move one square horizontally to the side. The promoted knight moves as a general.

- Before promotion:

a5	b5 white circle	c5	d5 white circle	e5
a4	b4	c4	d4	e4
a3	b3 white circle	c3 white knight	d3 white circle	e3
a2	b2	c2	d2	e2
a1	b1	c1	d1	e1

Light

a5	b5	c5	d5	e5
a4	b4	c4	d4	e4
a3	b3 black circle	c3 black knight	d3 black circle	e3
a2	b2	c2	d2	e2
a1	b1 black circle	c1	d1 black circle	e1

Dark

- After promotion:

a5	b5	c5	d5	e5
a4	b4 white circle	c4 white circle	d4 white circle	e4
a3	b3 white circle	c3 white knight	d3 white circle	e3
a2	b2	c2 white circle	d2	e2
a1	b1	c1	d1	e1

Light

a5	b5	c5	d5	e5
a4	b4	c4 black circle	d4	e4
a3	b3 black circle	c3 black knight	d3 black circle	e3
a2	b2 black circle	c2 black circle	d2 black circle	e2
a1	b1	c1	d1	e1

Dark

==== Pawn ====
The pawn steps one square forward. The promoted pawn moves as general.

a5	b5	c5	d5	e5
a4	b4	c4 white circle	d4	e4
a3	b3	c3 white pawn	d3	e3
a2	b2	c2	d2	e2
a1	b1	c1	d1	e1

Unpromoted pawn

a5	b5	c5	d5	e5
a4	b4 white circle	c4 white circle	d4 white circle	e4
a3	b3 white circle	c3 white pawn	d3 white circle	e3
a2	b2	c2 white circle	d2	e2
a1	b1	c1	d1	e1

Promoted pawn

=== Starting position ===
White: KD1 GC1 GE1 RG2 Bb2 BF1 NB1 NG1, pawns in the whole 3rd row
Black: KE8 GD8 Gf8 Rb7 BC8 BG7 NB8 NG8, pawns in the whole 6th row

=== Promotion ===
A player's promotion zone consists of the three farthest ranks. If a player's man crosses into its promotion zone, the player immediately promotes the man at the end of the turn. The king and general cannot promote. A pawn and the knight, after entering into the promotion zone instantly obtain a general movement by rotating its cube. After being dropped from the stack into the promotion zone they do not get promoted instantly, but they can be promoted when they move. A rook becomes a promoted rook, the bishop becomes a promoted bishop. A rook and a bishop dropped from the reservoir into the promotion zone are not promoted instantly, but they can be when they move (out of, or wholly within the zone).

=== Drops ===
Each player owns a stack for staging captured men, which are always stored not to promote. This is achieved by rotating a cube: captured unit changes a colour and loses a promotion. A player whose turn it is to move may either move a man on the chessboard, or drop any man from his stack on any vacant square, but a pawn may not be dropped on a file already containing a pawn of the same color. or on the last rank (there it can not move).

=== Check and checkmate ===
Check, checkmate, and draws follow the same conditions as in classical chess. However, it is not permitted to give perpetual check in EuroShogi.

1. Repetition: If the same position occurs three times with the same player to move, then the game is a draw. (Recall, however, the prohibition against giving perpetual check.)
2. Impasse: The game might reach an impasse if kings are advanced into their respective promotion zones and neither player has any hope of mating the other; or, if there is no chance of gaining any further material.

== See also ==
- Crazyhouse
