= Okisaki shogi =

Okisaki shogi (御妃将棋 okisaki shōgi "Queen shogi") is a modern variant of shogi (Japanese chess). It was developed by Masayuki Nakayachi c. 1996 from suggestions by German chess player Ralph Blockhaus.

Okisaki shogi is similar to standard shogi, but is played on a 10×10 board. There are ten pawns and a queen, which moves like a queen in Western chess. The knights also move as in Western chess.

== Rules of the game ==
=== Game equipment ===
Two players, Black and White (or 先手 sente and 後手 gote), play on a board ruled into a grid of 10 ranks (rows) by 10 files (columns). The squares are undifferentiated by marking or color.

Each player has a set of 22 wedge-shaped pieces, of slightly different sizes. From largest to smallest (most to least powerful) they are:

- 1 king
- 1 queen
- 1 rook
- 1 bishop
- 2 gold generals
- 2 silver generals
- 2 knights
- 2 lances
- 10 pawns

==== Table of pieces ====
Listed here are the pieces of the game with their Japanese representation:

Piece	Kanji	Rōmaji	Abr.	Meaning
King (reigning)	王将	ōshō	王	royal general
King (challenging)	玉将	gyokushō	玉	jade general
Queen	妃将	hishō or okisaki	妃	princess
Rook	飛車	hisha	飛	flying chariot
Promoted rook	竜王	ryūō	竜	dragon king
Bishop	角行	kakugyō	角	angle mover
Promoted bishop	竜馬	ryūma	馬	dragon horse
Gold general	金将	kinshō	金	gold general
Silver general	銀将	ginshō	銀	silver general
Promoted silver	成銀	narigin	全	promoted silver
Knight	跳馬	chōma	跳	jumping horse
Promoted knight	成跳	narichō	今	promoted jumper
Lance	香車	kyōsha	香	incense chariot
Promoted lance	成香	narikyō	仝	promoted incense
Pawn	歩兵	fuhyō	歩	foot soldier
Promoted pawn	と金	tokin	个	reaches gold

English speakers sometimes refer to promoted bishops as horses and promoted rooks as dragons, after their Japanese names, and generally use the Japanese name tokin for promoted pawns. Silver generals and gold generals are commonly referred to simply as silvers and golds.

The characters inscribed on the backs of the pieces to indicate promoted rank may be in red ink, and are usually cursive. The characters on the backs of the pieces that promote to gold generals are cursive versions of 金 'gold', becoming more cursive (more abbreviated) as the value of the original piece decreases. Another convention has abbreviated versions of the original characters, with a reduced number of strokes. The first version has been adopted for this article, as the abbreviated version of 跳 is not known (this piece not appearing in standard shogi).

=== Setup ===
10	9	8	7	6	5	4	3	2	1
香 車	跳 馬	銀 将	金 将	王 将	妃 将	金 将	銀 将	跳 馬	香 車	一
	飛 車							角 行		二
歩 兵	歩 兵	歩 兵	歩 兵	歩 兵	歩 兵	歩 兵	歩 兵	歩 兵	歩 兵	三
										四
										五
										六
										七
歩 兵	歩 兵	歩 兵	歩 兵	歩 兵	歩 兵	歩 兵	歩 兵	歩 兵	歩 兵	八
	角 行							飛 車		九
香 車	跳 馬	銀 将	金 将	妃 将	玉 将	金 将	銀 将	跳 馬	香 車	十

10	9	8	7	6	5	4	3	2	1
L	N	S	G	K	Q	G	S	N	L	a
	R							B		b
P	P	P	P	P	P	P	P	P	P	c
										d
										e
										f
										g
P	P	P	P	P	P	P	P	P	P	h
	B							R		i
L	N	S	G	Q	K	G	S	N	L	j

=== Movement and capture ===
Piece moves are as in standard shogi, apart from the queen (妃将 or 妃 hishō or okisaki "princess") and the knights (跳馬 or 跳 chōma), which move as in Western chess, and the lance, which can move directly forward or backwards (standard shogi knights and lances can only move forward.) An opposing piece is captured by displacement: That is, if a piece moves to a square occupied by an opposing piece, the opposing piece is displaced and removed from the board. A piece cannot move to a square occupied by a friendly piece (meaning another piece controlled by the moving player).

Each piece in the game moves in a characteristic pattern. Pieces move either orthogonally (that is, forward, backward, left, or right, in the direction of one of the arms of a plus sign, +), or diagonally (in the direction of one of the arms of a multiplication sign, ×). The knight is an exception in that it does not move in a straight line.

If a pawn, which cannot retreat or move aside, advances across the board until it can no longer move, it must promote.

Some pieces are capable of several kinds of movement, with the type of movement most often depending on the direction in which they move. The movement categories are:

==== Step movers ====
Some pieces move only one square at a time. (If a friendly piece occupies an adjacent square, the moving piece may not move in that direction; if an opposing piece is there, it may be displaced and captured.)

The step movers are the king, gold general, silver general and the ten pawns on each side.

==== Jumping piece ====
The knight can jump, that is, it can pass over any intervening piece, whether friend or foe, with no effect on either.

==== Ranging piece ====
The bishop, rook, and queen can move any number of empty squares along a straight line, limited only by the edge of the board. If an opposing piece intervenes, it may be captured by moving to that square and removing it from the board. A ranging piece must stop where it captures, and cannot bypass a piece that is in its way. If a friendly piece intervenes, the moving piece is limited to a distance that stops short of the intervening piece; if the friendly piece is adjacent, it cannot move in that direction at all.

=== Promotion ===
A player's promotion zone consists of the three farthest ranks, at the original line of the opponent's pawns and beyond (that is, the opponent's territory at setup). If a piece crosses the board within the promotion zone, including moves into, out of, or wholly within the zone, then that player may choose to promote the piece at the end of the turn. Promotion is effected by turning the piece over after it moves, revealing the name of its promoted rank.

Promoting a piece has the effect of changing how that piece moves until it is removed from the board. Each piece promotes as follows:

- A king, a queen, or a gold general cannot promote, nor can pieces which are already promoted.
- A silver general, knight, lance or pawn, when promoted, loses its normal movement and gains the movement of a gold general.
- A bishop or rook, when promoted, keeps its normal movement and gains the ability to move one square in any direction (like a king). This means the bishop is now able to reach any square on the board, given enough moves.

If a pawn reaches the farthest rank, it must be promoted, since it would otherwise have no legal move on subsequent turns. Because they can back out, the rules in standard shogi making it mandatory to promote knights and lances in the final ranks do not apply to okisaki shogi.

=== Drops ===
Captured pieces are retained in hand, and can be brought back into play under the capturing player's control. On any turn, instead of moving a piece on the board, a player may select a piece in hand and place it—unpromoted side up and facing the opposing side—on any empty square. The piece is then one of that player's active pieces on the board and can be moved accordingly. This is called dropping the piece, or simply, a drop. A drop counts as a complete move.

A drop cannot capture a piece, nor does dropping within the promotion zone result in immediate promotion. Capture and/or promotion may occur normally, however, on subsequent moves of the piece.

A pawn may not be dropped on the furthest rank, since it would have no legal moves on subsequent turns. Because they can back out, the restrictions in standard shogi on dropping knights on the last two ranks and lances on the final rank do not apply to okisaki shogi.

There are two additional restrictions when dropping pawns, as in standard shogi:

1. Nifu (Japanese: 二歩): A pawn cannot be dropped onto a file (column) containing another unpromoted pawn of the same player (promoted pawns do not count). A player with an unpromoted pawn on every file is therefore unable to drop a pawn anywhere. For this reason it is common to sacrifice a pawn in order to gain flexibility for drops.
2. Uchifuzume (Japanese: 打ち歩詰め): A pawn cannot be dropped to give an immediate checkmate. (Although other pieces may be dropped to give immediate checkmate.) A pawn may, however, be dropped to give immediate check.

The ability for drops in okisaki shogi give the game tactical richness and complexity, as no piece ever goes entirely out of play.

=== Individual pieces ===
Below are diagrams indicating each piece's movement. Pieces are paired with their promotion. Pieces with a grey heading start out in the game; those with a blue heading only appear on the board after promotion. Betza's funny notation has been included in brackets for easier reference.

Notation
○	Steps to an adjacent square
☆	Jumps to a non-adjacent square, bypassing any intervening piece
│	Ranges along a straight line, crossing any number of empty squares
─	Ranges along a straight line, crossing any number of empty squares
╲	Ranges along a straight line, crossing any number of empty squares
╱	Ranges along a straight line, crossing any number of empty squares

King

Step: The king can step one square in any direction, orthogonal or diagonal. The challenger moves first. (K)

○	○	○
○	王	○
○	○	○

The king does not promote.
Queen

Range: The queen can move any number of free squares along any one of the eight orthogonal or diagonal directions. (Q)

╲		│		╱
	╲	│	╱	
─	─	妃	─	─
	╱	│	╲	
╱		│		╲

The queen does not promote.
Rook
Dragon King
Range: The rook can move any number of free squares along any of the four orthogonal directions. (R)

		│		
		│		
─	─	飛	─	─
		│		
		│		

Range: The dragon king can move any number of free squares along any of the four orthogonal directions.

Step: It can move one square in any diagonal direction. (FR)

		│		
	○	│	○	
─	─	龍	─	─
	○	│	○	
		│		

Bishop
Dragon Horse
Range: The bishop can move any number of free squares along any of the four diagonal directions. (B)

Because it cannot move orthogonally, an unpromoted bishop can only reach half the squares on the board.

╲				╱
	╲		╱	
		角		
	╱		╲	
╱				╲

Range: The dragon horse can move any number of free squares along any of the four diagonal directions.

Step: It can move one square in any orthogonal direction. (WB)

╲				╱
	╲	○	╱	
	○	馬	○	
	╱	○	╲	
╱				╲

Gold General

Step: The gold general can step one square in one of the four orthogonal directions; or, one square diagonally forward, giving it six possibilities. (WfF)

○	○	○
○	金	○
	○	

The gold general does not promote.
Silver General
Promoted Silver General
Step: The silver general can step one square in one of the four diagonal directions; or, one square straight forward, giving it five possibilities. (FfW)

○	○	○
	銀	
○		○

Step: The promoted silver general can step one square in one of the four orthogonal directions; or, one square diagonally forward, giving it six possibilities. (WfF)

○	○	○
○	全	○
	○	

Knight
Promoted Knight
Jump: The knight jumps at an angle intermediate between orthogonal and diagonal, amounting to one intersection orthogonally plus one intersection diagonally, in a single motion, ignoring any intervening piece. That is, it has a choice of eight destinations. (N)

	☆		☆	
☆				☆
		跳		
☆				☆
	☆		☆	

Step: The promoted knight can step one square in one of the four orthogonal directions; or, one square diagonally forward, giving it six possibilities. (WfF)

○	○	○
○	今	○
	○	

Lance
Promoted Lance
Range: The lance can move any number of free squares straight forward or backward. (fbR)

This is the move of the reverse chariot in chu shogi.

│
│
香
│
│

Step: The promoted lance can step one square in one of the four orthogonal directions; or, one square diagonally forward, giving it six possibilities. (WfF)

○	○	○
○	仝	○
	○	

Pawn
Tokin
Step: The pawn can step one square forward. (fW)

A pawn that reaches the farthest rank must promote.

○
歩

Step: The tokin can step one square in one of the four orthogonal directions; or, one square diagonally forward, giving it six possibilities. (WfF)

○	○	○
○	个	○
	○	

=== Game end ===
A player who captures the opponent's king or all other pieces wins the game (unless the bared player immediately follows this baring by baring his own opponent, in which case it is a draw). In practice this rarely happens, as a player will resign when checkmated, or otherwise when loss is inevitable.

A player who makes an illegal move loses immediately. (This rule may be relaxed in casual games.)

There are two other possible (but fairly uncommon) ways for a game to end: repetition (千日手 sennichite) and impasse (持将棋 jishōgi).

If the same position occurs four times with the same player to play, then the game is no contest. However, if this is the result of perpetual check, the checking player loses. For the position to be considered the same, both the board position and the pieces in hand must be identical.

The game reaches an impasse if both kings have advanced into their respective promotion zones and neither player can hope to mate the other or to gain any further material.

== Game notation ==
The method used in English-language texts to express shogi moves was established by George Hodges in 1976. It is derived from the algebraic notation used for chess, but differs in several respects.

A typical example is P-8g. The first letter represents the piece moved: P = pawn, L = lance, N = knight, S = silver, G = gold, B = bishop, R = rook, Q = queen, K = king. Promoted pieces have a + added in front of the letter. e.g., +P for a tokin (promoted pawn). The designation of the piece is followed by a symbol indicating the type of move: - for an ordinary move and x for a capture. Next is the designation for the square on which the piece lands. This consists of a number representing the file and a lowercase letter representing the rank, with 1a being the top right corner (as seen from Black's point of view) and 10j being the bottom left corner. (This method of designating squares is based on Japanese convention, which, however, uses Japanese numerals instead of letters. For example, the square 2c is denoted by 2三 in Japanese.)

If a move entitles the player to promote the piece, then a + is added to the end to signify that the promotion was taken, or an = to indicate that it was declined. For example, Nx7c= indicates a knight capturing on 7c without promoting.

In cases where the above notation would be ambiguous, the designation of the start square is added after the designation for the piece in order to make clear which piece is meant.

Moves are commonly numbered as in chess.
