= Heian dai shogi =

Early large board variant of shogi

Heian dai shogi (Japanese: 平安大将棋 'Heian (Era) large chess') is an early large board variant of shogi (Japanese chess) as it was played in the Heian period. The same 12th century document which describes the Heian form of shogi also describes this variant, where it is simply known as dai shōgi (大将棊). This 13 × 13 variant is retrospectively named Heian dai shogi to distinguish it from the later dai shogi played on a 15 × 15 board.

== History ==
The Nichūreki (二中歴), an encyclopedia dating to the Kamakura era, gives the following description in the section titled Shōgi (将棊), following a description of Heian shogi:

又大將棊十三間云 玉將各住一方中 金將在脇 銀將在金之次 次有銀將 次有銅將 次有鐵將 次有香車 銅將不行四隅 鐵將不行後三方 又橫行在王之頂方 行前一步左右不云多少 又有猛虎在銀之頂 行四角一步 飛龍在桂馬之上 行四隅超越 奔車在香車之頂 行前後不云多少 注人在中心步兵之頂 行前後如是 一方如此行方准之	Also, dai (large) shogi has thirteen squares on each side. The king sits in the center of each side. The gold generals are on the sides (of the king). The silver generals are next to the gold generals. Following are the silver generals; Following are the copper generals; Following are the iron generals; Following are the lances. The copper general does not move to the four corners. The iron general does not move to the three rear directions. There is also the side mover on top of the king; It moves one step forward, and unlimitedly left or right. There are also fierce tigers on top of the silver generals; It moves one square diagonally. The flying dragons are above the knights; It moves on the four diagonals unlimitedly. The free chariots are on top of the lances; It moves forward and backwards unlimitedly. The go-between is in the center, above the pawn; It moves forward and backwards. One should follow these moves.

In the section describing the initial setup, the silver general is mentioned twice, while the knight is not mentioned.

This description first mentions the king as gyokushō (玉将, "jade general") and states that it sits in the center of each side (各住一方中), implying that, unlike modern shogi, both kings were undifferentiated at the time. However, later it refers to the king as ō (王, "king"), which also suggests that there had already been a distinction between ōshō (王将, "king general") and gyokushō (玉将, "jade general") as in modern shogi.

== Rules of the game ==
=== Objective ===
The objective of the game is to capture your opponent's king or to capture all the other pieces, leaving a bare king. Unlike standard shogi, pieces may not be dropped back into play after capture.

=== Game equipment ===
Two players, Black and White (or 先手 sente and 後手 gote), play on a board ruled into a grid of 13 ranks (rows) by 13 files (columns) for a total of 169 squares. The squares are undifferentiated by marking or color.

Each player has a set of 34 wedge-shaped pieces of 13 different types. In all, the players must remember 13 different moves. The pieces are of slightly different sizes. From largest to smallest (most to least powerful) they are:

- 1 king
- 2 flying dragons
- 2 gold generals
- 2 silver generals
- 1 side mover
- 2 copper generals
- 2 iron generals
- 2 fierce tigers
- 2 free chariots
- 1 go between
- 2 knights
- 2 lances
- 13 pawns

The name of the king, knight and pawn were chosen to correspond to pieces with similar move sets in western chess, rather than using a literal translation of the Japanese names.

Each piece has its name in the form of two kanji written on its face. On the reverse side of each piece (other than kings and gold generals) are one or two other characters, often in a different color (e.g., red instead of black); this reverse side is turned up to indicate that the piece has been promoted during play. The pieces of the two sides do not differ in color, but instead each piece is shaped like a wedge, and faces forward, toward the opposing side. This shows who controls the piece during play.

=== Setup ===
13	12	11	10	9	8	7	6	5	4	3	2	1
香 車	桂 馬	鉄 将	銅 将	銀 将	金 将	玉 将	金 将	銀 将	銅 将	鉄 将	桂 馬	香 車	一
奔 車	飛 龍			猛 虎		横 行		猛 虎			飛 龍	奔 車	二
歩 兵	歩 兵	歩 兵	歩 兵	歩 兵	歩 兵	歩 兵	歩 兵	歩 兵	歩 兵	歩 兵	歩 兵	歩 兵	三
						注 人							四
													五
													六
													七
													八
													九
						注 人							十
歩 兵	歩 兵	歩 兵	歩 兵	歩 兵	歩 兵	歩 兵	歩 兵	歩 兵	歩 兵	歩 兵	歩 兵	歩 兵	十 一
奔 車	飛 龍			猛 虎		横 行		猛 虎			飛 龍	奔 車	十 二
香 車	桂 馬	鉄 将	銅 将	銀 将	金 将	玉 将	金 将	銀 将	銅 将	鉄 将	桂 馬	香 車	十 三

13	12	11	10	9	8	7	6	5	4	3	2	1
L	N	I	C	S	G	K	G	S	C	I	N	L	a
FC	FD			FT		SM		FT			FD	FC	b
P	P	P	P	P	P	P	P	P	P	P	P	P	c
						GB							d
													e
													f
													g
													h
													i
						GB							j
P	P	P	P	P	P	P	P	P	P	P	P	P	k
FC	FD			FT		SM		FT			FD	FC	l
L	N	I	C	S	G	K	G	S	C	I	N	L	m

Each side places his pieces in the positions shown below, pointing toward the opponent.

- In the rank nearest the player:
  - The king is placed in the center file.
  - The two gold generals are placed in the adjacent files to the king.
  - The two silver generals are placed adjacent to each gold general.
  - The two copper generals are placed adjacent to each silver general.
  - The two iron generals are placed adjacent to each copper general.
  - The two knights are placed adjacent to each iron general.
  - The two lances are placed in the corners, adjacent to each knight.

That is, the first rank is

L	N	I	C	S	G	K	G	S	C	I	N	L

or

香	桂	鉄	銅	銀	金	玉	金	銀	銅	鉄	桂	香

- In the second rank, each player places:
  - The side mover in the same file as the king.
  - The fierce tigers in the same files as the silver generals.
  - The flying dragons in the same files as the knights
  - The free chariots in the same files as the lances.
- In the third rank, the thirteen pawns are placed one in each file.
- In the fourth rank, the go between is placed in the same file as the side mover.

=== Game play ===
Two players alternate in making a move, with Black moving first. (The pieces are not differentiated by color; the traditional chess terms "Black" and "White" are only used to indicate who plays first, and to differentiate the sides during discussions of the game.) A move consists of moving a piece either to an empty square on the board or to a square occupied by an opposing piece, thus displacing (capturing) that piece; and optionally of promoting the moving piece, if its move enters the promotion zone.

=== Movement and capture ===
An opposing piece is captured by displacement: That is, if a piece moves to a square occupied by an opposing piece, the opposing piece is displaced and removed from the board. A piece cannot move to a square occupied by a friendly piece, that is, by another piece controlled by the moving player.

Each piece on the game moves in a characteristic pattern. Pieces move either orthogonally (that is, forward, backward, left, or right, in the direction of one of the arms of a plus sign, +), or diagonally (in the direction of one of the arms of a multiplication sign, ×). The knight is an exception in that it does not move in a straight line.

If a piece that cannot retreat or move aside advances across the board until it can no longer move, it must promote. This applies to the pawn, lance and knight upon reaching the furthest rank.

Some pieces are capable of several kinds of movement, with the type of movement most often depending on the direction in which they move. The movement categories are:

==== Step movers ====
Some pieces move only one square at a time. (If a friendly piece occupies an adjacent square, the moving piece may not move in that direction; if an opposing piece is there, it may be displaced and captured.)

The step movers are the king, generals, fierce tiger, go between and the 13 pawns on each side.

==== Jumping piece ====
The knight can jump, that is, it can pass over any intervening piece, whether friend or foe, with no effect on either.

==== Ranging pieces ====
Many pieces can move any number of empty squares along a straight orthogonal or diagonal line, limited only by the edge of the board. If an opposing piece intervenes, it may be captured by moving to that square and removing it from the board. A ranging piece must stop where it captures, and cannot bypass a piece that is in its way. If a friendly piece intervenes, the moving piece is limited to a distance that stops short of the intervening piece; if the friendly piece is adjacent, it cannot move in that direction at all.

The ranging pieces are the flying dragon, side mover, free chariot and lance.

=== Promotion ===
The promotion zone is the 'enemy camp', the farthest three ranks of the board, which are mostly occupied by the opposing player's pieces when the board is first set up. When a promotable piece enters the promotion zone, it has the option of "promoting" to a more powerful rank. Promotion is effected by turning the piece over after it moves, revealing the name of its promoted rank. The characters inscribed on the backs of the pieces to indicate promoted rank may be in red ink. Promotion is not mandatory if the unpromoted piece could move further on a later turn, and in some cases it may be beneficial to leave the piece unpromoted; however, there may be restrictions on whether the piece can promote again later. (The rule in the later chu shogi would always allow promotion on captures that touch the promotion zone, but would only allow promotion on a non-capture if the piece exited the promotion zone and then reentered.) Promotion is permanent and promoted pieces may not revert to their original rank. All pieces in Heian dai shogi promote to a gold general.

If a pawn, knight or lance reaches the furthest rank without promoting, it can no longer promote and has no legal move on subsequent turns.

=== Individual pieces ===
Following are diagrams that indicate the movement of each piece. Pieces are listed roughly in order, from nearest to furthest rows. Betza's funny notation has been included in brackets for easier reference.

It should be noted to players of chu shogi and dai shogi that the copper general and iron general move differently in this game from how they move in the other two games. Here they have the move of the angry boar (wazir) and evil wolf respectively. The side mover and flying dragon are also different (the latter has the move of the bishop, and its promoted version has the move of the dragon horse).

Notation
○	Steps to an adjacent square
☆	Jumps to a non-adjacent square, bypassing any intervening piece
│	Ranges along a straight line, crossing any number of empty squares
─	Ranges along a straight line, crossing any number of empty squares
╲	Ranges along a straight line, crossing any number of empty squares
╱	Ranges along a straight line, crossing any number of empty squares

Piece Kanji Rōmaji
King 玉将 gyokushō
Text description of piece movement.

Image description of piece movement.

Step: The king can step one square in any direction, orthogonal or diagonal. (K)

○	○	○
○	玉	○
○	○	○

Gold General 金将 kinshō
Silver General 銀将 ginshō
Step: The gold general can step one square in one of the four orthogonal directions; or, one square diagonally forward, giving it six possibilities. (WfF)

○	○	○
○	金	○
	○	

Step: The silver general can take one step diagonally, or else directly forward, giving it five possibilities. (FfW)

○	○	○
	銀	
○		○

Copper General 銅将 dōshō
Iron General 鉄将 tesshō
Step: The copper general can take one step in any of the four orthogonal directions. (W)

	○	
○	銅	○
	○	

Step: The iron general can step one square in one of the three forward directions; or, one square sideways, giving it five possibilities. (frlK)

○	○	○
○	鉄	○

Knight 桂馬 keima
Lance 香車 kyōsha
Jump: The knight jumps at an angle intermediate between orthogonal and diagonal, amounting to one square forward plus one square diagonally forward, in a single motion, ignoring any intervening piece. That is, it has a choice of two forward destinations. (ffN)

If an unpromoted knight reaches the farthest rank without capturing a piece, it can no longer promote.

☆		☆
	桂	

Range: The lance can move any number of free squares directly forward. (fR)

If an unpromoted lance reaches the farthest rank without capturing a piece, it can no longer promote.

│
│
香

Side Mover 横行 ōgyō
Fierce Tiger 猛虎 mōko
Range: The side mover can move any number of free squares orthogonally sideways.

Step: It can step one square directly forward. (fWrlR)

		○		
─	─	横	─	─

Step: The fierce tiger can step one square along any of the four diagonal directions. (F)

○		○
	虎	
○		○

Flying Dragon 飛龍 hiryū
Free Chariot 奔車 hansha
Range: The flying dragon can move any number of free squares along any one of the four diagonals. (B)

Because it cannot move orthogonally, it can only reach half the squares on the board.

╲				╱
	╲		╱	
		龍		
	╱		╲	
╱				╲

Range: The free chariot can move any number of free squares directly forward or backward. (fbR)

│
│
車
│
│

Pawn 歩兵 fuhyō
Go Between 注人 chūnin
Step: The pawn can only step one square directly forward. (fW)

If an unpromoted pawn reaches the farthest rank without capturing a piece, it can no longer promote.

○
歩

Step: The go between steps one square directly forward or backward. (fbW)

○
注
○

=== Check and mate ===
When a player makes a move such that the opponent's king could be captured on the following move, the move is said to give check to the king; the king is said to be in check. If a player's king is in check and no legal move by that player will get it out of check, the checking move is also mate, and effectively wins the game.

A player is not allowed to give perpetual check.

=== Game end ===
A player who captures the opponent's king or all the other pieces (bare king) wins the game unless the opponent’s bare king can bare the player’s king on the next move, in which case the game is a draw. In practice this winning condition rarely happens, as a player will resign when checkmated, as otherwise when loss is inevitable.

A player who makes an illegal move loses immediately. (This rule may be relaxed in casual games.)

There is one other possible (but fairly uncommon) ways for a game to end: repetition (千日手 sennichite). If the same position occurs four times with the same player to play, then the game is no contest. (Recall, however, the prohibition against perpetual check.)

== Game notation ==
The method used in English-language texts to express shogi moves was established by George Hodges in 1976. It is derived from the algebraic notation used for chess, but modifications have been made for heian dai shogi.

A typical example is P-8f. The first letter represents the piece moved: P = pawn, L = lance, N = knight, GB = go between, FC = free chariot, FT = fierce tiger, I = iron, C = copper, SM = side mover, S = silver, G = gold, FD = flying dragon, K = king. Promoted pieces have a + added in front of the letter, for example +P for a promoted pawn. The designation of the piece is followed by a symbol indicating the type of move: - for an ordinary move or x for a capture. Next is the designation for the square on which the piece lands. This consists of a number representing the file and a lowercase letter representing the rank, with 1a being the top right corner (as seen from Black's point of view) and 13m being the bottom left corner. (This method of designating squares is based on Japanese convention, which, however, uses Japanese numerals instead of letters. For example, the square 2c is denoted by 2三 in Japanese.)

If a move entitles the player to promote the piece, then a + is added to the end to signify that the promotion was taken, or an = to indicate that it was declined. For example, Nx7c= indicates a knight capturing on 7c without promoting.

In cases where the above notation would be ambiguous, the designation of the start square is added after the designation for the piece in order to make clear which piece is meant.

Moves are commonly numbered as in chess.

== See also ==
- Shogi variant
- Heian shogi
- Wa shogi
- Chu shogi
- Dai shogi
- Tenjiku shogi
- Dai dai shogi
- Maka dai dai shogi
- Tai shogi
- Taikyoku shogi
