= Dai dai shogi =

Large board variant of shogi

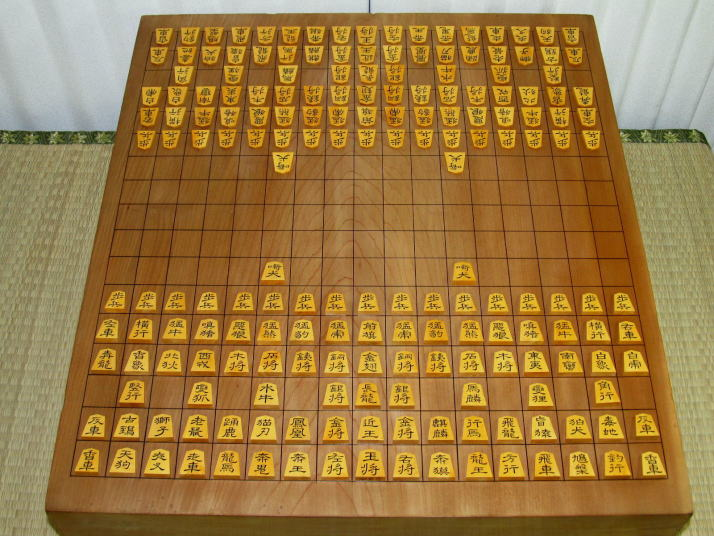
Dai dai shogi set

Dai dai shōgi (大大将棋 'huge chess') is a large board variant of shogi (Japanese chess). The game dates back to the 15th century and is based on the earlier dai shogi. Apart from its size, the major difference is in the range of the pieces and the "promotion by capture" rule. It is the smallest board variant to use this rule.

Because of the terse and often incomplete wording of the historical sources for the large shogi variants, except for chu shogi and to a lesser extent dai shogi (which were at some points of time the most prestigious forms of shogi being played), the historical rules of dai dai shogi are not clear. Different sources often differ significantly in the moves attributed to the pieces, and the degree of contradiction (summarised below with the listing of most known alternative moves) is such that it is likely impossible to reconstruct the "true historical rules" with any degree of certainty, if there ever was such a thing. It is not clear if the game was ever played much historically, as the few sets that were made seem to have been intended only for display.

== Rules of the game ==
=== Objective ===
The objective is to capture the opponent's king. Unlike standard shogi, pieces may not be dropped back into play after being captured.

=== Game equipment ===
Two players, Black and White (or sente and gote), play on a board composed of squares in a grid of 17 ranks (rows) by 17 files (columns) with a total of 289 squares. The squares are undifferentiated by marking or color.

Each player has a set of 96 wedge-shaped pieces of 64 different types. In all, the players must remember 68 different moves. The pieces are of slightly different sizes, from largest to smallest (or roughly most to least powerful) they are:

- 1 King (King general/Jeweled general)
- 1 Queen
- 1 Rushing bird
- 1 Free demon
- 1 Free dream-eater
- 1 Water buffalo
- 1 Dragon king
- 1 Dragon horse
- 1 Square mover
- 1 Racing chariot
- 1 Rook
- 1 Bishop
- 1 Golden bird
- 1 Great dragon
- 1 Standard bearer
- 1 Fragrant elephant
- 1 White elephant
- 1 Lion
- 1 Lion dog
- 1 Dove
- 1 She-devil
- 1 Blue dragon
- 1 White tiger
- 1 Right chariot
- 1 Left chariot
- 1 Phoenix
- 1 Kirin
- 1 Poisonous snake
- 1 Old kite
- 2 Violent oxen
- 1 Flying dragon
- 1 Enchanted fox
- 1 Old rat
- 1 Enchanted badger
- 1 Flying horse
- 1 Prancing stag
- 2 Savage tigers
- 1 Hook mover
- 1 Long-nosed goblin
- 1 Northern barbarian
- 1 Southern barbarian
- 1 Eastern barbarian
- 1 Western barbarian
- 1 Neighboring king
- 1 Blind monkey
- 2 Ferocious leopards
- 2 Evil Wolves
- 2 Violent bears
- 1 Right general
- 1 Left general
- 2 Gold generals
- 2 Silver generals
- 2 Copper generals
- 2 Iron generals
- 2 Wood generals
- 2 Stone generals
- 2 Angry boars
- 1 Cat sword
- 2 Reverse chariots
- 2 Lances
- 2 Side movers
- 1 Vertical mover
- 2 Howling Dogs
- 17 Pawns

Many of the English-language names are chosen to correspond to their rough equivalents in Western chess, not necessarily as translations of the Japanese names. (Sometimes the queen is called the "free king", a direct translation of its Japanese name. The kirin's name is sometimes anglicised as kylin.)

Each piece has its name in the form of two Japanese characters marked on its face. On the reverse side of some pieces are one or two other characters, often in a different color (e.g., red instead of black); this reverse side is used to indicate that the piece has been promoted during play. The pieces of the two sides do not differ in color, but instead each piece is shaped like a wedge, and faces forward, toward the opposing side. This shows who controls the piece during play.

Listed below are the pieces of the game and, if they promote, which pieces they promote to.

==== Table of pieces ====
Relatively few pieces promote (or demote) in dai dai shogi. A few pieces (*asterisked) only appear upon promotion.

Piece	Kanji	Rōmaji	Abbrev.		Promotes to
Jeweled general	玉将	gyokushō	K	玉	—
King general	王将	ōshō	K	王	—
Angry boar	嗔猪	shincho	AB	猪	—
Bishop	角行	kakugyō	B	角	—
Blind monkey	盲猿	mōen	BM	猿	mountain witch
Blue dragon	青龍	seiryū	BD	青	—
Cat sword	猫刄	myōjin	CS	猫	dragon horse
Copper general	銅将	dōshō	C	銅	—
Dove	鳩槃	kyūhan	Do	鳩	—
Dragon horse	龍馬	ryūme	DH	馬	—
Dragon king	龍王	ryūō	DK	竜	—
Eastern barbarian	東夷	tōi	Ea	東	lion
Enchanted badger	変狸	henri	EB	狸	dove
Enchanted fox	変狐	henko	EF	狐	she-devil
Evil wolf	悪狼	akurō	EW	狼	—
Ferocious leopard	猛豹	mōhyō	FL	豹	—
Flying dragon	飛龍	hiryū	FD	龍	dragon king
Flying horse	馬麟	barin	FH	麟	queen
Fragrant elephant	香象	kōzō	FE	象	—
Free demon	奔鬼	honki	Fr	鬼	—
Free dream-eater	奔獏	honbaku	FT	獏	—
*Furious fiend	奮迅	funjin	FF	迅	—
Gold general	金将	kinshō	G	金	—
Golden bird	金翅	kinshi	GB	翅	—
Great dragon	大龍	dairyū	GD	大	—
*Great elephant ‡	大象	taizō	GE	–	—
Hook mover	鉤行	kōgyō	HM	行	—
Howling dog	𠵇犬 †	kiken	HD	𠵇	—
Iron general	鉄将	tesshō	I	鐵	—
Kirin	麒麟	kirin	Kr	麒	great dragon
Lance	香車	kyōsha	L	香	—
Left chariot	左車	sasha	LC	–	—
Left general	左将	sashō	LG	–	—
Lion	獅子	shishi	Ln	獅	furious fiend
Lion dog	狛犬	komainu	LD	狛	great elephant ‡
Long-nosed goblin	天狗	tengu	Lo	天	—
*Mountain witch	山母	sambo	MW	母	—
Neighboring king	近王	kinnō	NK	近	standard bearer
Northern barbarian	北狄	hokuteki	No	北	fragrant elephant
Old kite	古鵄	kotetsu	OK	古	long-nosed goblin
Old rat	老鼠	rōso	OR	鼠	wizard stork
Pawn	歩兵	fuhyō	p	歩	—
Phoenix	鳳凰	hōō	Ph	鳳	golden bird
Poisonous snake	毒蛇	dokuja	Po	蛇	hook mover
Prancing stag	踊鹿	yōroku	PS	鹿	square mover
Queen	奔王	honnō	Q	奔	—
Racing chariot	走車	sōsha	Ra	走	—
Reverse chariot	反車	hensha	Rv	反	—
Right chariot	右車	usha	RC	–	—
Right general	右将	ushō	RG	–	—
Rook	飛車	hisha	R	飛	—
Rushing bird	行鳥	gyōchō	RB	鳥	free demon
Savage tiger	猛虎	mōko	ST	虎	—
She-devil	夜叉	yasha	SD	叉	—
Side mover	横行	ōgyō	SM	横	—
Silver general	銀将	ginshō	S	銀	—
Southern barbarian	南蛮	namban	So	南	white elephant
Square mover	方行	hōgyō	Sq	方	—
Standard bearer	前旗	zenki	SB	前	—
Stone general	石将	sekishō	St	石	—
Vertical mover	竪行	shugyō	VM	竪	—
Violent bear	猛熊	mōyū	VB	熊	—
Violent ox	猛牛	mōgyū	VO	牛	—
Water buffalo	水牛	suigyū	WB	水	free dream-eater
Western barbarian	西戎	seijū	We	西	lion dog
White elephant	白象	hakuzō	WE	–	—
White tiger	白虎	byakko	WT	–	—
*Wizard stork	仙鶴 ††	senkaku	WS	仙	—
Wood general	木将	mokushō	W	木	—

† The first kanji of Howling Dog may not appear in some fonts. It is a combined 口 and 奇.
‡ The great elephant is mentioned as the promoted lion dog in the Shōgi Rokushu no Zushiki, but not in the other two Edo-era sources, when the lion dog does not promote.
†† The second character in 'wizard stork' is not present in most fonts: it should be 而 atop 鷦.

The queen could also be abbreviated FK (for free king) and the kirin as Ky (for kylin).

=== Setup ===
Below is a diagram showing the setup of one player's pieces. The way one player sees their own pieces is the same way the opposing player will see their pieces.

Board layout
8																	
7						HD						HD					
6	p	p	p	p	p	p	p	p	p	p	p	p	p	p	p	p	p
5	LC	SM	VO	AB	EW	VB	FL	ST	SB	ST	FL	VB	EW	AB	VO	SM	RC
4	BD	FE	No	We	W	St	I	C	GB	C	I	St	W	Ea	So	WE	WT
3		VM		EF		WB		S	GD	S		FH		EB		B	
2	Rv	OK	Ln	OR	PS	CS	Ph	G	NK	G	Kr	RB	FD	BM	LD	Po	Rv
1	L	Lo	SD	Ra	DH	Fr	Q	LG	K	RG	FT	DK	Sq	R	Dv	HM	L
	A	B	C	D	E	F	G	H	I	J	K	L	M	N	O	P	Q

AB = Angry Boar	B = Bishop	BM = Blind Monkey	BD = Blue Dragon
CS = Cat Sword	C = Copper General	Dv = Dove	DH = Dragon Horse
DK = Dragon King	Ea = Eastern Barbarian	EB = Enchanted Badger	EF = Enchanted Fox
EW = Evil Wolf	FL = Ferocious Leopard	FD = Flying Dragon	FH = Flying Horse
FE = Fragrant Elephant	Fr = Free Demon	FT = Free Dream-Eater	G = Gold General
GB = Golden Bird	GD = Great Dragon	HM = Hook Mover	HD = Howling Dog
I = Iron General	K = King	Kr = Kirin	L = Lance
LC = Left Chariot	LG = Left General	Ln = Lion	LD = Lion Dog
Lo = Long-nosed Goblin	NK = Neighboring King	No = Northern Barbarian	OK = Old Kite
OR = Old Rat	P = Pawn	Ph = Phoenix	Po = Poison Snake
PS = Prancing Stag	Q = Queen	Ra = Racing Chariot	Rv = Reverse Chariot
RC = Right Chariot	RG = Right General	R = Rook	RB = Rushing Bird
ST = Savage Tiger	SD = She-Devil	SM = Side Mover	S = Silver General
So = Southern Barbarian	Sq = Square Mover	SB = Standard Bearer	St = Stone General
VM = Vertical Mover	VB = Violent Bear	VO = Violent Ox	WB = Water Buffalo
We = Western Barbarian	WE = White Elephant	WT = White Tiger	W = Wood General

=== Game play ===
The players alternate making a move, with Black moving first. (The traditional terms 'black' and 'white' are used to differentiate the sides during discussion of the game, but are not literally correct.) A move consists of moving a piece on the board and potentially promoting the piece. Each of these options is detailed below.

=== Promotion ===
Unusually for a large-board shogi variant, only a minority of pieces (21 of 64) are able to promote. The rule for promotion in these larger games is different from smaller board variants.

A piece promotes at the end of its first capturing move. Promotion has the effect of changing how the piece moves (see the table above for what each piece promotes to), and is effected by turning the piece over after it moves, revealing the name of its promoted rank. Promotion for pieces able to do so is both compulsory and permanent.

This is very different from smaller shogi variants, where pieces promote when they cross a promotion zone (the enemy camp), and where promotion is optional. The dots on the dai dai shogi board that would represent promotion zones in other games only function as placement guides for the initial setup of the two camps.

Most promoting pieces promote to a piece that exists in the initial setup of the board. However, such a promoted piece cannot then promote a second time as its namesake does. For example, a lion promotes to a furious fiend. However, while an eastern barbarian promotes to a lion on its first capturing move, it does not further promote to a furious fiend on its second. Rather, it remains a lion for the rest of the game. This should be obvious from the game pieces, which only have two sides.

If a piece which is only able to move forward (a pawn, lance, stone general, wood general, or iron general) reaches the far rank without promoting, it is unable to move further and must remain there until captured.

The promoting pieces appear on the 2nd, 3rd, and 4th ranks of the initial setup. Pieces on the middle three files or the edge file do not promote. Most promoting pieces stand close to their promoted versions in the initial setup.

=== Movement and capture ===
An opposing piece is captured by displacement: That is, if a piece moves to a square occupied by an opposing piece, the opposing piece is displaced and removed from the board. A piece cannot move to a square occupied by a friendly piece (meaning another piece controlled by the moving player).

Each piece on the game moves in a characteristic pattern. Pieces move either orthogonally (that is, forward, backward, left, or right, in the direction of one of the arms of a plus sign, +), or diagonally (in the direction of one of the arms of a multiplication sign, ×). The lion, lion dog, and furious fiend are exceptions, in that they do not move, or are not required to move, in a straight line.

If a piece that cannot retreat or move aside advances across the board until it can no longer move, it must remain there until captured. This applies to the pawn, lance, stone general, wood general, and iron general.

Many pieces are capable of several kinds of movement, with the type of movement most often depending on the direction in which they move. The movement categories are:

==== Step movers ====
Some pieces move only one square at a time. (If a friendly piece occupies an adjacent square, the moving piece may not move in that direction; if an opposing piece is there, it may be displaced and captured.)

==== Limited ranging pieces ====
Some pieces can move along a limited number (2, 3, or 5) of free (empty) squares along a straight line in certain directions. Other than the limited distance, they move like ranging pieces (see below).

==== Jumping pieces ====
Several pieces can jump, that is, they can pass over any intervening piece, whether friend or foe, with no effect on either. These are the lion, lion dog, kirin, phoenix, and poisonous snake.

==== Ranging pieces ====
Many pieces can move any number of empty squares along a straight line, limited only by the edge of the board. If an opposing piece intervenes, it may be captured by moving to that square and removing it from the board. A ranging piece must stop where it captures, and cannot bypass a piece that is in its way. If a friendly piece intervenes, the moving piece is limited to a distance that stops short of the intervening piece; if the friendly piece is adjacent, it cannot move in that direction at all.

==== Hook moves (changing tack) ====
The hook mover and long-nosed goblin (tengu) can move any number of squares along a straight line, as a normal ranging piece, but may also abruptly change tack left or right by 90° at any one place along the route, and then continue as a ranging piece. Turning a corner like this is optional.

The range covered by a hook move is the equivalent of two moves by a rook, or two moves by a bishop, depending the piece. However, a hook move is functionally a single move: The piece cannot capture twice in one move, nor may it capture and then move on. It must stop before an intervening piece (unless it first changes direction to avoid it), and must stop when it captures, just like any other ranging piece. It can only change direction once per move.

==== Lion moves (multiple captures) ====
The lion, lion dog, and furious fiend have sequential multiple-capture abilities, called "lion moves". The details of these powerful moves are described for the lion and lion dog, below.

=== Individual pieces ===
In the diagrams below, the different types of moves are coded by symbol and by color: Blue for step moves, yellow for jumps, green for multiple capture, and gray for range moves, as follows:

Notation
○	Steps a limited number of squares along a straight line.
☆	Jumps to this square, bypassing any intervening piece.
!	Igui (capture without moving). Counts as two steps.
☆	May jump directly to this square, or reach it through a multiple-step move.
│	Ranges along a straight line, crossing any number of empty squares
─	Ranges along a straight line, crossing any number of empty squares
╲	Ranges along a straight line, crossing any number of empty squares
╱	Ranges along a straight line, crossing any number of empty squares
╳	May turn 90° at this square.
┼	May turn 90° at this square.

Piece names with a grey background are present at the start of the game; the four with a blue background only appear with promotion. Betza's funny notation has been included in brackets for easier reference, with the extension that the notation xxxayyyK stands for an xxxK move possibly followed by an yyyK move, not necessarily in the same direction. By default continuation legs can go into all directions, but can be restricted to a single line by a modifier 'v' ("vertical", interpreted relative to the piece's current position on its path). The default modality of all legs is the ability to move and capture: other possibilities are specified explicitly. Thus while aK moves twice as a king and can capture on both its moves, mKaK moves twice as a king but must stop when it captures.

There are many divergent descriptions in the Edo-era sources; mostly, the rules from The Chess Variant Pages are followed below, with the exception of the great elephant. Some divergent moves are detailed in the footnotes.

King (challenging) 玉将 gyokushō	King (reigning) 王将 ōshō
○ / ○ / ○; ○ / 玉 / ○; ○ / ○ / ○; Step: The king can step one square in any direction, orthogonal or diagonal. (K)	○ / ○ / ○; ○ / 王 / ○; ○ / ○ / ○; Step: The king can step one square in any direction, orthogonal or diagonal. (K)
Promoting pieces
Long-nosed goblin 天狗 tengu	Hook mover 鉤行 kōgyō
╳ / / ╱ / / ╲ / / ╳; / ╳ / / / / ╳; ╱ / / ╳ / ○ / ╳ / / ╲; / / ○ / 天 / ○; ╲ / / ╳ / ○ / ╳ / / ╱; / ╳ / / / / ╳; ╳ / / ╲ / / ╱ / / ╳; Hook move: The tengu can move any number of free squares along one of the four diagonal directions, then (optionally) make a 90° turn and move any number of free squares in a perpendicular diagonal direction.; It may only change directions once per move.: Step: It can step one square in one of the four orthogonal directions. (WmBaB)	/ ─ / ─ / ┼ / ─ / ─; │ / / ─ / ┼ / ─ / / │; │ / │ / / ┼ / / │ / │; ┼ / ┼ / ┼ / 行 / ┼ / ┼ / ┼; │ / │ / / ┼ / / │ / │; │ / / ─ / ┼ / ─ / / │; / ─ / ─ / ┼ / ─ / ─; Hook move: The hook mover can move any number of free squares along one of the four orthogonal directions, then (optionally) make a 90° turn and move any number of free squares in a perpendicular orthogonal direction. (RmaR); It may only change directions once per move.
Old kite 古鵄 kotetsu	Poisonous snake 毒蛇 dokuja
/ / ○; / ○ / ○ / ○; ○ / ○ / 古 / ○ / ○; / / ○; / / ○; Limited range: The old kite can step one or two squares in one of the four orthogonals.; Step: It can step one square diagonally forward. (R2fF); The old kite promotes to a tengu (above).	/ / ☆; / ○ / 蛇 / ○; ☆ / / / / ☆; Jump: The poisonous snake can jump to the second square directly forward or diagonally backward.; Step: It can step one square to either side. (rlWfDbA); The poisonous snake promotes to a hook mover (above).
Great elephant 大象 taizō	Furious fiend 奮迅 funjin
/ / / / │; / / / / ☆; / / ○ / / ☆ / / ○; / / / ○ / ! / ○; ─ / ☆ / ☆ / ! / 大象 / ! / ☆ / ☆ / ─; / / / ! / ! / !; / / ☆ / / ☆ / / ☆; / ☆ / / / ☆ / / / ☆; ╱ / / / / │ / / / / ╲; Range: The great elephant, should it exist in this game (there is some dispute on this point among the Edo-era sources), can move any number of free squares along one of the four orthogonal directions, or diagonally backward.; Limited range: It can move up to two free squares along either of the forward diagonals.; Lion move/triple capture: It has the three-step lion move of the lion dog, but only along the orthogonals and backward diagonals.; The great elephant does not exist except as a promoted lion dog (below).	☆ / / / ☆ / / / ☆; / ☆ / ☆ / ☆ / ☆ / ☆; / ☆ / ! / ! / ! / ☆; ☆ / ☆ / ! / 迅 / ! / ☆ / ☆; / ☆ / ! / ! / ! / ☆; / ☆ / ☆ / ☆ / ☆ / ☆; ☆ / / / ☆ / / / ☆; The furious fiend can move as a lion or as a lion dog. (NADaKafavK); The furious fiend does not exist except as a promoted lion (below).
Lion dog 狛犬 komainu	Lion 獅子 shishi
☆ / / / ☆ / / / ☆; / ☆ / / ☆ / / ☆; / / ! / ! / !; ☆ / ☆ / ! / 狛 / ! / ☆ / ☆; / / ! / ! / !; / ☆ / / ☆ / / ☆; ☆ / / / ☆ / / / ☆; Lion move/triple capture: The lion dog can make a three-step lion move along any one of the eight orthogonal or diagonal directions. That is, unlike the lion itself, but like the soaring eagle and horned falcon, it is restricted to moving along a straight line and cannot move to the in-between squares. This lion power includes jumping, igui, and skipping a turn.; A piece may be captured on all three steps.; The lion dog may capture a piece on the first and second square, and then retreat to the first square. Or it may snatch a piece off the first square as in normal igui. (Note however that it may not then continue in the opposite direction: it is restricted to one orthogonal or diagonal.); It may jump to the second square, and then continue to the third square, capturing up to two pieces. Or it may jump directly to the third square.; It is not required to take all three steps. (KavKafavK); As it finishes a capturing move, the lion dog promotes to a great elephant (above). In rules that do not use the great elephant, the lion dog cannot promote.	☆ / ☆ / ☆ / ☆ / ☆; ☆ / ! / ! / ! / ☆; ☆ / ! / 獅 / ! / ☆; ☆ / ! / ! / ! / ☆; ☆ / ☆ / ☆ / ☆ / ☆; Double move: The lion can step in any direction, and capture, up to twice a turn. The two steps do not need to be in the same direction, so this move is equivalent to two turns of a king. As a piece does not promote until its turn ends, an unpromoted lion has a chance for a double capture.; By moving back to its starting square, it can effectively capture a piece on an adjacent square without moving. This is called 居喰い igui "stationary feeding".; It can also do the same to an empty square, without capturing anything. This is traditionally indicated by tapping the lion and leaving it in place.; Jump: A lion can jump anywhere within a distance of two squares: That is, anywhere it could reach in two step-moves on an empty board, though of course it cannot land on a square occupied by a friendly piece. This is equivalent to jumping in any of the eight diagonal or orthogonal directions, or making any of the jumps of a knight in Western chess. (NADaK); As it finishes a capturing move, the lion promotes to a furious fiend (above).
Western barbarian 西戎 seijū	Eastern barbarian 東夷 tōi
/ ○ / ○ / ○; ○ / ○ / 西 / ○ / ○; / / ○; Limited range: The western barbarian can move one or two squares orthogonally sideways.; Step: It can step one square directly forward or backward, or diagonally forward. (rlR2fbWfF); The western barbarian promotes to a lion dog (above).	/ ○; ○ / ○ / ○; ○ / 東 / ○; / ○; / ○; Limited range: The eastern barbarian can move one or two squares directly forward or backward.; Step: It can step one square orthogonally sideways or diagonally forward. (fbR2rlWfF); The eastern barbarian promotes to a lion (above).
Fragrant elephant 香象 kōzō	White elephant 白象 hakuzō
╲ / / / / / / ╱; / ╲ / / ○ / / ╱; / / ╲ / ○ / ╱; / ○ / ○ / 象 / ○ / ○; / / ○ / ○ / ○; / ○ / / ○ / / ○; Range: The fragrant elephant can move any number of free squares along either of the forward diagonals.; Limited range: It can move one or two squares along any of the other directions (orthogonally, or diagonally backwards). (fBR2bB2)	/ ○ / / ○ / / ○; / / ○ / ○ / ○; / ○ / ○ / 白象 / ○ / ○; / / ╱ / ○ / ╲; / ╱ / / ○ / / ╲; ╱ / / / / / / ╲; Range: The white elephant can move any number of free squares diagonally backward.; Limited range: It can move one or two square in one of the other six diagonal or orthogonal directions. (bBR2fB2)
Northern barbarian 北狄 hokuteki	Southern barbarian 南蛮 namban
○ / / / / ○; / ○ / / ○; / ○ / 北 / ○; / ○ / / ○; Limited range: The northern barbarian can move one or two squares diagonally forward.; Step: It can step one square orthogonally sideways or diagonally backward. (fB2rlWF); The northern barbarian promotes to a fragrant elephant (above).	/ ○ / / ○; / ○ / 南 / ○; / ○ / / ○; ○ / / / / ○; Limited range: The southern barbarian can move one or two squares diagonally backward.; Step: It can step one square orthogonally sideways or diagonally forward. (bB2rlWF); The southern barbarian promotes to a white elephant (above).
Free dream-eater 奔獏 honbaku	Free demon 奔鬼 honki
╲ / / / / / │ / / / / / ╱; / ╲ / / / / │ / / / / ╱; / / ╲ / / / │ / / / ╱; / / / ╲ / / │ / / ╱; / / / / ╲ / │ / ╱; ○ / ○ / ○ / ○ / ○ / 獏 / ○ / ○ / ○ / ○ / ○; / / / / ╱ / │ / ╲; / / / ╱ / / │ / / ╲; / / ╱ / / / │ / / / ╲; / ╱ / / / / │ / / / / ╲; ╱ / / / / / │ / / / / / ╲; Range: The free dream-eater can move any number of free squares diagonally.; Limited range: It can move one to five squares orthogonally sideways. (fbRBrlR5)	╲ / / / / / ○ / / / / / ╱; / ╲ / / / / ○ / / / / ╱; / / ╲ / / / ○ / / / ╱; / / / ╲ / / ○ / / ╱; / / / / ╲ / ○ / ╱; ─ / ─ / ─ / ─ / ─ / 鬼 / ─ / ─ / ─ / ─ / ─; / / / / ╱ / ○ / ╲; / / / ╱ / / ○ / / ╲; / / ╱ / / / ○ / / / ╲; / ╱ / / / / ○ / / / / ╲; ╱ / / / / / ○ / / / / / ╲; Range: The free demon can move any number of free squares in the diagonal directions, or directly sideways.; Limited range: It can move one to five squares directly forward or backward. (rlRBfbR5)
Water buffalo 水牛 suigyū	Rushing bird 行鳥 gyōchō
╲ / / / / / / ╱; / ╲ / / ○ / / ╱; / / ╲ / ○ / ╱; ─ / ─ / ─ / 水 / ─ / ─ / ─; / / ╱ / ○ / ╲; / ╱ / / ○ / / ╲; ╱ / / / / / / ╲; Range: The water buffalo can move any number of free squares in the four diagonal directions, or orthogonally sideways.; Limited range: It can move one or two squares directly forward or backward. (rlRBfbR2); The water buffalo promotes to a free dream-eater (above).	╲ / / / │ / / / ╱; / ╲ / / │ / / ╱; / / ╲ / │ / ╱; ─ / ─ / ─ / 鳥 / ─ / ─ / ─; / / ╱ / / ╲; / ╱ / / / / ╲; ╱ / / / / / / ╲; Range: The rushing bird can move any number of free squares in any direction, orthogonal or diagonal, except directly backwards. (BfrlR); The rushing bird promotes to a free demon (above).
Queen 奔王 honnō	Standard bearer 前旗 zenki
╲ / / / │ / / / ╱; / ╲ / / │ / / ╱; / / ╲ / │ / ╱; ─ / ─ / ─ / 奔 / ─ / ─ / ─; / / ╱ / │ / ╲; / ╱ / / │ / / ╲; ╱ / / / │ / / / ╲; Range: The queen can move any number of free squares in any of the eight directions, orthogonal or diagonal. (Q)	╲ / / / │ / / / ╱; / ╲ / / │ / / ╱; / / ╲ / │ / ╱; / ○ / ○ / 前 / ○ / ○; / / ○ / ○ / ○; / ○ / / ○ / / ○; Range: The standard bearer can move any number of free squares along any of the three forward directions (diagonal or orthogonal).; Limited range: It can step one or two squares along any of the other directions (orthogonally sideways, diagonally backwards, or directly backwards). (Q2fQ)
Flying horse 馬麟 barin	Neighboring king 近王 kinnō
○ / / / / ○; / ○ / ○ / ○; / ○ / 麟 / ○; / / ○; Limited range: The flying horse can step one or two squares diagonally forward.; Step: It can step one square in one of the four orthogonal directions. (fB2W); The flying horse promotes to a queen (above).	○ / ○ / ○; ○ / 近 / ○; ○ / ○ / ○; Step: The neighbor king can step one square in any direction, orthogonal or diagonal. (K); The neighboring king promotes to a standard bearer (above).
Mountain witch 山母 sambo	Wizard stork 仙鶴 senkaku
╲ / / / / / / ╱; / ╲ / / / / ╱; / / ╲ / ○ / ╱; / / / 母; / / ╱ / │ / ╲; / ╱ / / │ / / ╲; ╱ / / / │ / / / ╲; Range: The mountain witch can move any number of free squares along one of the four diagonal directions, or directly backward; or, Step: It can step one square directly forward. (BbRfW); The mountain witch does not exist except as a promoted blind monkey (below).	╲ / / / │ / / / ╱; / ╲ / / │ / / ╱; / / ╲ / │ / ╱; / / / 仙; / / ╱ / ○ / ╲; / ╱ / / / / ╲; ╱ / / / / / / ╲; Range: The wizard stork can move any number of free squares along one of the four diagonal directions, or directly forward; or, Step: It can step one square directly backward. (BfRbW); The wizard stork does not exist except as a promoted old rat (below).
Blind monkey 盲猿 mōen	Old rat 老鼠 rōso
○ / / ○; ○ / 猿 / ○; ○ / / ○; Step: The blind monkey can step one square in one of the four diagonal directions or either orthogonal sideways. (FrlW); The blind monkey promotes to a mountain witch (above).	○ / / / / ○; / ○ / / ○; / / 鼠; / / ○; / / ○; Limited range: The old rat can move one or two squares along a forward diagonal or the rear orthogonal, giving it three directions of movement. (fB2bR2); The old rat has the same move as the enchanted fox (see below), but the old rat promotes to a wizard stork (above).
Dove 鳩槃 kyūhan	She-devil 夜叉 yasha
○ / / / / / / / / / / ○; / ○ / / / / / / / / ○; / / ○ / / / / / / ○; / / / ○ / / ○ / / ○; / / / / ○ / ○ / ○; / / / ○ / ○ / 鳩 / ○ / ○; / / / / ○ / ○ / ○; / / / ○ / / ○ / / ○; / / ○ / / / / / / ○; / ○ / / / / / / / / ○; ○ / / / / / / / / / / ○; First limited range: The dove can move one to five squares in one of the four diagonal directions.; Second limited range: It can step one or two squares in one of the four orthogonal directions. (R2B5)	/ / / / / ○; / / / / / ○; / / / / / ○; / / / ○ / / ○ / / ○; / / / / ○ / ○ / ○; ○ / ○ / ○ / ○ / ○ / 叉 / ○ / ○ / ○ / ○ / ○; / / / / ○ / ○ / ○; / / / ○ / / ○ / / ○; / / / / / ○; / / / / / ○; / / / / / ○; First limited range: The she-devil can move one to five squares along one of the four orthogonal directions.; Second limited range: It can step one or two squares along one of the four diagonal directions. (R5B2)
Enchanted badger 変狸 henri	Enchanted fox 変狐 henko
/ / ○; / / ○; ○ / ○ / 狸 / ○ / ○; Limited range: The enchanted badger can move one or two squares orthogonally forward or sideways. (frlR2); The enchanted badger promotes to a dove (above).	○ / / / / ○; / ○ / / ○; / / 狐; / / ○; / / ○; Limited range: The enchanted fox can move one or two squares along a forward diagonal or the rear orthogonal, giving it three directions of movement. (fB2bR2); This is the same move as the old rat (see above), but the enchanted fox promotes to a she-devil (above).
Dragon horse 龍馬 ryūme	Dragon king 龍王 ryūō
The dragon horse moves as either a bishop or a king.: ╲ / / / / / / ╱; / ╲ / / / / ╱; / / ╲ / ○ / ╱; / / ○ / 馬 / ○; / / ╱ / ○ / ╲; / ╱ / / / / ╲; ╱ / / / / / / ╲; Range: The dragon horse can move any number of free squares along any of the four diagonal directions.; Step: It can step one square in any orthogonal direction. (WB)	The dragon king moves as either a rook or a king.: / / / │; / / / │; / / ○ / │ / ○; ─ / ─ / ─ / 竜 / ─ / ─ / ─; / / ○ / │ / ○; / / / │; / / / │; Range: The dragon king can move any number of free squares along any of the four orthogonal directions.; Step: It can step one square in any diagonal direction. (FR)
Cat sword 猫刄 myōjin	Flying dragon 飛龍 hiryū
○ / / ○; / 猫; ○ / / ○; Step: The cat sword can move one square in one of the four diagonal directions. (F); Because it cannot move orthogonally, an unpromoted cat sword can only reach half the squares on the board. The cat sword promotes to a dragon horse (above).	○ / / / / ○; / ○ / / ○; / / 龍; / ○ / / ○; ○ / / / / ○; Step: The flying dragon can move one or two squares along one of the four diagonal directions. (B2); Because it cannot move orthogonally, an unpromoted flying dragon can only reach half the squares on the board. The flying dragon promotes to a dragon king (above).
Racing chariot 走車 sōsha	Square mover 方行 hōgyō
/ / / │; / / / │; / / / │; ─ / ─ / ─ / 走 / ─ / ─ / ─; / / ○ / │ / ○; / / / │; / / / │; Range: The racing chariot can move any number of free squares along one of the four orthogonal directions.; Step: It can step one square diagonally behind. (RbF); Nothing promotes into a racing chariot, but it was included here due to the symmetry of its move with that of the square mover (right). In several English sources the name of this piece is mistranslated as "side chariot".	/ / / │; / / / │; / / ○ / │ / ○; ─ / ─ / ─ / 方 / ─ / ─ / ─; / / / │; / / / │; / / / │; Range: The square mover can move any number of free squares along one of the four orthogonal directions.; Step: It can step one square on either forward diagonal. (RfF)
	Prancing stag 踊鹿 yōroku
	/ ○ / ○ / ○; ○ / ○ / 鹿 / ○ / ○; / ○ / / ○; Limited range: The prancing stag can move one or two squares directly sideways.; Step: It can step one square in one of the four diagonal directions, or directly forward. (rlR2FfW); It cannot move directly backwards. The prancing stag promotes to a square mover (above).
Golden bird 金翅 kinshi	Great dragon 大龍 dairyū
○ / / / │ / / / ○; / ○ / / │ / / ○; / / ○ / │ / ○; / ○ / ○ / 翅 / ○ / ○; / / ○ / │ / ○; / ○ / / │ / / ○; ○ / / / │ / / / ○; Range: The golden bird can move any number of free squares directly forward or backward.; 1st limited range: It can move one to three squares along any one of the four diagonals.; 2nd limited range: It can move one or two squares directly sideways. (fbRB3rlR2)	○ / / / / / / ○; / ○ / / ○ / / ○; / / ○ / ○ / ○; ─ / ─ / ─ / 大 / ─ / ─ / ─; / / ○ / ○ / ○; / ○ / / ○ / / ○; ○ / / / / / / ○; Range: The great dragon can move any number of free squares directly to the side.; 1st limited range: It can move one to three squares along any one of the four diagonals.; 2nd limited range: It can move one or two squares directly forward or backward. (rlRB3fbR2)
Phoenix 鳳凰 hōō	Kirin 麒麟 kirin
☆ / / / / ☆; / / ○; / ○ / 鳳 / ○; / / ○; ☆ / / / / ☆; Step: The phoenix can step one square in one of the four orthogonal directions.; Jump: It can jump to the second square in one of the four diagonal directions. (WA); The phoenix promotes to a golden bird (above).	/ / ☆; / ○ / / ○; ☆ / / 麒 / / ☆; / ○ / / ○; / / ☆; Step: The kirin can step one square in one of the four diagonal directions.; Jump: It can jump to the second square in one of the four orthogonal directions. (FD); Because of its unusual movement, an unpromoted kirin can only reach half the squares on the board. The kirin promotes to a great dragon (above).
Non-promoting pieces
Bishop 角行 kakugyō	Rook 飛車 hisha
╲ / / / / / / ╱; / ╲ / / / / ╱; / / ╲ / / ╱; / / / 角; / / ╱ / / ╲; / ╱ / / / / ╲; ╱ / / / / / / ╲; Range: The bishop can move any number of free squares along any of the four diagonal directions. (B); Because it cannot move orthogonally or promote, a bishop can only reach half the squares on the board.	/ / / │; / / / │; / / / │; ─ / ─ / ─ / 飛 / ─ / ─ / ─; / / / │; / / / │; / / / │; Range: The rook can move any number of free squares along any of the four orthogonal directions. (R)
Left chariot 左車 sasha	Right chariot 右車 usha
╲ / / / │; / ╲ / / │; / / ╲ / │; / / / 左車; / / / ○ / ╲; / / / / / ╲; / / / / / / ╲; Range: The left chariot can move any number of free squares straight forward, or along the forward left or rear right diagonals. (fR[fl][br]BbW); Step: It can step one square directly backward.	/ / / │ / / / ╱; / / / │ / / ╱; / / / │ / ╱; / / / 右車; / / ╱ / ○; / ╱; ╱; Range: The right chariot can move any number of free squares straight forward, or along the forward right or rear left diagonals.; Step: It can step one square directly backward. (fR[fr][bl]BbW)
White tiger 白虎 byakko	Blue dragon 青龍 seiryū
╲ / / / │; / ╲ / / │; / / ╲ / │ / ○; / ○ / ○ / 白虎 / ○ / ○; / / / │; / / / │; / / / │; Range: The white tiger can move any number of free squares directly forward or backward, or along the forward left diagonal.; Limited range: It can step one or two squares directly sideways. (fbR[fl]BrlR2fF); Step: It can step one square diagonally forward to the right.	/ / / / / / ╱; / / / ○ / / ╱; / / ○ / ○ / ╱; ─ / ─ / ─ / 青 / ─ / ─ / ─; / / / ○; / / / ○; Range: The blue dragon can move any number of free squares directly to either side, or along the forward right diagonal.; Limited range: It can step one or two squares directly forward or backward. (rlR[fr]BfbR2fF); Step: It can step one square diagonally forward to the left.
Side mover 横行 ōgyō	Vertical mover 竪行 shugyō
/ / / ○; ─ / ─ / ─ / 横 / ─ / ─ / ─; / / / ○; Range: The side mover can move any number of free squares directly sideways.; Step: It can move one square directly forward or backward. (rlRW)	/ │; / │; / │; ○ / 竪 / ○; / │; / │; / │; Range: The vertical mover can move any number of free squares directly forward or backward.; Step: It can move one square directly sideways. (fbRW)
Howling Dog 𠵇犬 kiken	Reverse chariot 反車 hensha
│; │; │; 𠵇; ○; Range: The howling dog can move any number of free squares directly forward.; Step: It can step one square directly backwards. (fRbW)	│; │; │; 反; │; │; │; Range: The reverse chariot can move any number of free squares directly forward or backward, giving it two directions of movement. (fbR)
Violent ox 猛牛 mōgyū	Lance 香車 kyōsha
/ / ○; / / ○; ○ / ○ / 牛 / ○ / ○; / / ○; / / ○; Limited range: The violent ox can move one or two squares in one of the four orthogonal directions. (R2)	│; │; │; 香; Range: The lance can move any number of free squares directly forward, giving it only one direction of movement. (fR); A lance that reaches the far rank is trapped.
Angry boar 嗔猪 shincho	Violent bear 猛熊 mōyū
/ ○; ○ / 猪 / ○; / ○; Step: The angry boar can step one square in one of the four orthogonal directions. (W)	○ / / / / ○; / ○ / / ○; / ○ / 熊 / ○; Limited range: The violent bear can move one or two squares diagonally forward, or, Step: It can step one square orthogonally sideways. (fB2rlW)
Left general 左将 sashō	Right general 右将 ushō
○ / ○ / ○; / 左将 / ○; ○ / ○ / ○; Step: The left general can move one square in any direction except directly left. It is called the left general because it guards the left side of the board. (FfrbW)	○ / ○ / ○; ○ / 右将; ○ / ○ / ○; Step: The right general can step one square in any direction except directly right. It is called the right general because it guards the right side of the board. (FflbW)
Gold general 金将 kinshō	Ferocious leopard 猛豹 mōhyō
○ / ○ / ○; ○ / 金 / ○; / ○; Step: The gold general can step one square in the four orthogonal directions, or diagonally forward, giving it six directions of movement. (WfF); It cannot move diagonally backward.	○ / ○ / ○; / 豹; ○ / ○ / ○; Step: The leopard can step one square in the four diagonal directions, or directly forward or backward, giving it six directions of movement. (FfbW); That is, it can move to any of the six adjacent squares ahead or behind it.
Silver general 銀将 ginshō	Evil wolf 悪狼 akurō
○ / ○ / ○; / 銀; ○ / / ○; Step: The silver general can move one square in the four diagonal directions, or directly forward, giving it five directions of movement. (FfW)	○ / ○ / ○; ○ / 狼 / ○; Step: The evil wolf can step one square orthogonally sideways or forward, or diagonally forward. (frlK)
Copper general 銅将 dōshō	Savage tiger 猛虎 mōko
○ / ○ / ○; / 銅; / ○; Step: The copper general can move one square directly forward or backward, or one square diagonally forward, giving it four directions of movement. (fFfbW)	/ ○; ○ / ○ / ○; / 虎; / ○; / ○; Limited range: The savage tiger can move one or two squares orthogonally forward or backward; Step: It can step one square diagonally forward. (fbR2fF)
Iron general 鉄将 tesshō	Wood general 木将 mokushō
○ / ○ / ○; / 鐵; Step: The iron general can move one square forward, either orthogonally or diagonally, giving it three directions of movement. (fK); An iron general that reaches the far rank is trapped.	○ / / / / ○; / ○ / / ○; / / 木; Limited range: The wood general can move one or two squares along a forward diagonal. (fB2); A wood general that reaches the far rank is trapped.
Stone general 石将 sekishō	Pawn 歩兵 fuhyō
○ / / ○; / 石; Step: The stone general can step one square diagonally forward, giving it two possibilities. (fF); A stone general that reaches the far rank is trapped.	○; 歩; Step: A pawn can step one square directly forward. (fW); A pawn that reaches the far rank is trapped.

=== Repetition ===
A player may not make a move if the resulting position is one that has previously occurred in the game with the same player to move. This is called repetition (千日手 sennichite). Note that certain pieces have the ability to pass in certain situations (lions, lion dogs, and furious fiends). Such a pass move leaves the position unchanged, but it does not violate the repetition rule, as it will now be the turn of the other player to move. Of course, two consecutive passes are not possible, as the first player will see the same position as before.

However, evidence from chu shogi problems suggests that this at least does not apply to a player who is in check or whose pieces are attacked, as otherwise one could win via perpetual check or perpetual pursuit. The modern chu shogi rule as applied by the Japanese Chu Shogi Association (JCSA) is as follows, and presumably dai dai shogi should be similar. If one side is making attacks on other pieces (however futile) with his moves in the repeat cycle, and the other is not, the attacking side must deviate, while in case of checking the checker must deviate regardless of whether the checked side attacks other pieces. In the case of consecutive passes, the side passing first must deviate, making turn passing to avoid zugzwang pointless if the opponent is in a position where he can pass his turn too. Only the fourth repetition is forbidden by these rules. If none of these are applicable, repetition is a draw.

=== Check and mate ===
When a player makes a move such that the opponent's king could be captured on the following move, the move is said to give check to the king; the king is said to be in check. If a player's king is in check and no legal move by that player will get the king out of check, the checking move is also a mate, and effectively wins the game.

=== Game end ===
A player who captures the opponent's king wins the game. Thus a player who is checkmated or stalemated will lose. In practice this rarely happens; a player will resign when loss is inevitable and the king will be taken on the opponent's next move (as in International Chess) because of the tradition that it is seen as an embarrassment to lose. The very artificial situation of a smothered stalemate, where no moves are possible (even those that would expose the king), is not covered in the historical sources. On their pages for chu shogi and dai shogi, The Chess Variant Pages rule this as a loss for the stalemated player, for definiteness.

A player who makes an illegal move loses immediately. (This rule may be relaxed in casual games.)

== Game notation ==
The method used in English-language texts to express shogi moves was established by George Hodges in 1976. It is derived from the algebraic notation used for chess, but differs in several respects. Modifications have been made for dai dai shogi.

A typical example is P-8g. The first letter represents the piece moved (see above). Promoted pieces have a + added in front of the letter. (e.g., +BM for a mountain witch, or promoted blind monkey). The designation of the piece is followed by a symbol indicating the type of move: - for an ordinary move or x for a capture. Next is the designation for the square on which the piece lands. This consists of a number representing the file and a lowercase letter representing the rank, with 1a being the top right corner (as seen from Black's point of view) and 17q being the bottom left corner. (This method of designating squares is based on Japanese convention, which, however, uses Japanese numerals instead of letters. For example, the square 2c is denoted by 2三 in Japanese.)

If a lion captures by 'igūi’, the square of the piece being captured is used instead of the destination square, and this is preceded by the symbol '!'. If a double capture is made, than it is added after the first capture.

If a capture mandates the player to promote the piece, then a + is added to the end to signify that the promotion was taken. For example, CSx7c+ indicates a cat sword capturing on 7c and promoting.

In cases where the above notation would be ambiguous, the designation of the start square is added after the designation for the piece in order to make clear which piece is meant.

Moves are commonly numbered as in chess.

== Strategy ==
=== Piece values ===
According to the German Chu Shogi Association, the average values of the pieces are (using the interpretations of The Shogi Association, e.g. the lion dog as only a three-square range mover with no lion power):

Average piece values
Piece name	Approximate value	Promotion	Approximate value
King	4	—	—
Hook Mover	114	—	—
Long-Nosed Goblin	46	—	—
Lion	22	Furious Fiend	23
Queen	15	—	—
Rushing Bird	14	Free Demon	14
Free Dream-Eater	14	—	—
Free Demon	14	—	—
Water Buffalo	13	Free Dream-Eater	14
Standard Bearer	12	—	—
Golden Bird	10	—	—
Fragrant Elephant	10	—	—
Great Dragon	9	—	—
Dove	9	—	—
White Tiger	9	—	—
She-Devil	9	—	—
Lion Dog	8	Great Elephant	9
White Elephant	7	—	—
Dragon King	10	—	—
Dragon Horse	10	—	—
Square Mover	9	—	—
Blue Dragon	8	—	—
Rook	8	—	—
Bishop	7	—	—
Left Chariot	7	—	—
Right Chariot	7	—	—
Racing Chariot	9	—	—
Vertical Mover	5	—	—
Side Mover	5	—	—
Old Kite	4	Long-Nosed Goblin	46
Poisonous Snake	1	Hook Mover	114
Eastern Barbarian	4	Lion	22
Prancing Stag	4	Square Mover	9
Flying Horse	4	Queen	15
Neighbouring King	3	Standard Bearer	12
Northern Barbarian	3	Fragrant Elephant	10
Western Barbarian	3	Lion Dog	8
Southern Barbarian	3	White Elephant	7
Kirin	3	Great Dragon	9
Phoenix	3	Golden Bird	10
Old Rat	2	Wizard Stork	11
Blind Monkey	2	Mountain Witch	9
Enchanted Badger	2	Dove	9
Enchanted Fox	2	She-Devil	9
Flying Dragon	3	Dragon King	10
Cat Sword	2	Dragon Horse	10
Reverse Chariot	4	—	—
Lance	3	—	—
Howling Dog	3	—	—
Left General	3	—	—
Right General	3	—	—
Gold General	3	—	—
Violent Ox	3	—	—
Ferocious Leopard	3	—	—
Savage Tiger	3	—	—
Violent Bear	3	—	—
Evil Wolf	3	—	—
Silver General	2	—	—
Copper General	2	—	—
Wood General	2	—	—
Iron General	2	—	—
Angry Boar	2	—	—
Stone General	1	—	—
Pawn	1	—	—

These average values do not take into account the special status of the king as a royal piece. They have also been normalized so that the pawn is worth 1 point to avoid fractions. Additionally, pieces gain in value if they have a good chance of promotion. This is particularly significant for the old kite and poisonous snake, which promote to the two most powerful pieces in the game.

== See also ==
- Shogi variant
  - Wa shogi
  - Chu shogi
  - Heian dai shogi
  - Dai shogi
  - Tenjiku shogi
  - Maka dai dai shogi
  - Tai shogi
  - Taikyoku shogi

== Notes on pieces with conflicting descriptions ==
These descriptions are taken from Japanese Wikipedia, which references the Edo-era publications 象戯図式 Shōgi Zushiki (SZ), 諸象戯図式 Sho Shōgi Zushiki (SSZ), and 象棋六種之図式 Shōgi Rokushu no Zushiki (SRZ). The first two are generally though not always in agreement, but the third differs in the case of most pieces which are not found in smaller shogi variants.
