= Shōgi Zushiki =

The Shōgi Zushiki (象戯図式), Sho Shōgi Zushiki (諸象戯図式), and Shōgi Rokushu no Zushiki (象棋六種之図式) are Edo period publications describing various variants of Japanese chess, otherwise known as shōgi.

The Shōgi Zushiki covers the setup and moves of standard shōgi, chū shōgi, dai shōgi, tenjiku shōgi, dai dai shōgi, maka dai dai shōgi, and tai shōgi. It also mentions wa shōgi, Tang shōgi (which is seven-person Chinese chess), kō shōgi, and taikyoku shōgi.

The Sho Shōgi Zushiki (published 1694) covers the setup and moves of sho shōgi, standard shōgi, wa shōgi, chū shōgi, dai shōgi, tenjiku shōgi, dai dai shōgi, maka dai dai shōgi, and tai shōgi.

The Shōgi Rokushu no Zushiki (written 1443, published 1811) covers the setup and moves of sho shōgi, chū shōgi, dai shōgi, dai dai shōgi, maka dai dai shōgi, and tai shōgi.

The Shōgi Zushiki and Sho Shōgi Zushiki are generally though not always in agreement on the powers of the various pieces, but the Shōgi Rokushu no Zushiki differs in the descriptions of most pieces which are found only in the larger shogi variants, or which have distinctive moves in the larger variants.

== Bibliography ==
Shōgi Zushiki

- "Cultural History of Things and Humans 23 Shogi" Koichi Masukawa, Hosei University Press 1977 ISBN 4-588-20231-6
- "Elephant illustration ceremony" Dairoku Matsuura's brushwork 1909

Sho Shōgi Zushiki

- ?

Shōgi Rokushu no Zushiki

- "Cultural History of Things and Humans 23 Shogi" Koichi Masukawa, Hosei University Press 1977 ISBN 4-588-20231-6
- "Miscellaneous Art Series" National Book Publication Association 1915
