= Shogi variant =

Games based on, or similar to, shogi

A shogi variant is a game related to or derived from shogi (Japanese chess). Many shogi variants have been developed over the centuries, ranging from some of the largest chess-type games ever played to some of the smallest. A few of these variants are still regularly played, though none are as popular as shogi itself.

The drop rule, often considered the most notable feature of shogi, is absent from most shogi variants, which therefore play more like other forms of chess, with the board becoming less crowded as pieces are exchanged. This is especially true for variants larger than shogi itself. In fact, the largest well-known variant that features the drop rule is the 11×11 game wa shogi.

== Predecessors of modern shogi ==
Some form of chess had almost certainly reached Japan by the 9th century, if not earlier, but the earliest surviving Japanese description of the rules of chess dates from the early 12th century, during the Heian period. Unfortunately, this description does not give enough information to play the game, but this has not stopped people from trying to reconstruct this early form of shogi, which is usually referred to as Heian shogi (平安将棋). Piece movements were as in modern shogi, but there was no rook or bishop. The board appears to have been either 9×8 or 8×8. The setup is unknown, but can reasonably be assumed to have been the same as in modern shogi (minus the rook and bishop, and minus a gold general in the 8×8 case), but possibly the pawns started on the second rank rather than the third. It can safely be assumed that the game was played without drops, since the weak pieces promote strictly to gold, instead of just moving like gold.

By the 16th century the game had taken a form closer to the modern game: it was played on a 9×9 board with the same setup as in modern shogi except that an extra piece (an elephant) stood in front of the king. This form of the game is known as sho shogi (小将棋), which means "small shogi". (While 9×9 may not seem small, despite the name, it was smaller than the other shogi variants prevalent at the time.) The elephant was eliminated by the Emperor Go-Nara (reign 1526–1557), and it is assumed that the drop rule was introduced at about the same time, giving rise to shogi as we know it today.

=== Historical variants ===
There are a number of shogi variants played on boards larger than 9×9. These variants are all quite old, and were possibly all played without drops. Michael C. Vanier says, "It is thought that the really huge games (dai dai and up) were never really played to any significant extent [...] and were devised merely so that the creators could have the fun of inventing enormous games, amazing their friends and confounding their enemies. However, the games up to tenjiku shogi at least appear to be quite playable, assuming one has the time."

The same 12th-century document which describes the Heian form of shogi also describes a variant played on a 13×13 board, which is now called Heian dai shogi (平安大将棋). As with the smaller Heian shogi, the rules for this game have not been completely preserved.

The most popular large-board variant is chu shogi (中将棋), played on a 12×12 board. The name means medium shogi, and the game is sometimes so called (or called middle shogi) in English. Chu shogi has existed since at least the 14th century; there are earlier references, but it is not clear that they refer to the game as we now know it. Chu shogi is best known for a piece called the lion, which moves like a king but up to twice per turn. The game was still commonly played in Japan in the early 20th century, but has now largely died out. It has, however, gained some adherents in the West. The main reference work in English is the Middle Shogi Manual by George Hodges.

Other large medieval shogi variants were wa shogi (11×11, sometimes played with drops), dai shogi (大将棋, "great shogi", 15×15), tenjiku shogi (天竺将棋, literally "Indian shogi", but meant "exotic shogi", 16×16), dai dai shogi (大大将棋, "great great shogi", 17×17), maka dai dai shogi (摩訶大大将棋, "ultra great great shogi", 19×19) and tai shogi (泰将棋, "grand shogi", 25×25). These variants date back at least to the 17th century. Tai shogi was thought to be the world's largest chess variant, but recently records of an even larger variant, taikyoku shogi (大局将棋, "ultimate shogi", 36×36), was discovered. However, there is no evidence that any of them were commonly played apart from dai shogi. While a few sets for dai dai shogi, maka dai dai shogi, and tai shogi are known to have been made, they appear to have been intended as display pieces and not for actual playing. Furthermore, the sources for the rules of almost all the larger variants tend to disagree with each other on many particular issues, even including the very moves of the pieces, such that only for chu shogi and dai shogi is it well-known what the historical rules were, and some small lacunae still arise in the latter with rare situations.

Name	Board size	Pieces each	Piece types	Different moves	When invented	First mentioned	Notes
Sho shogi	9×9	21	10	10	Kamakura period		Ancestor of modern shogi.
Shogi	9×9	20	9	9	16th century		Introduced piece drops
Heian shogi	8×8 or 9×8 or 9x9	16 or 18	6	6	~1120 or before; Heian period		An early form of shogi.
Wa shogi	11×11	27	17	22	17th century; Edo period	1694; Shōgi Zushiki	All pieces are named after animals. Occasionally played.
Chu shogi	12×12	46	21	28	Early 14th century?; Muromachi period	1350; Yūgaku ōrai	Smaller version of dai shogi with fewer pieces (eliminating the least powerful ones) and different start setup. The most popular of the large variants.
Heian dai shogi	13×13	34	13	14	Heian period	1230; Nichūreki	
Dai shogi	15×15	65	29	36	~1230; Kamakura period	1300; Futsū Shōdōshū	
Tenjiku shogi	16×16	76	36	43	15th or 16th century; Muromachi period	1694; Shōgi Zushiki	Enlarged version of chu shogi with more pieces (adding even more powerful ones) and different start setup. One of the relatively more popular large variants.
Dai dai shogi	17×17	96	64	68	15th century; Muromachi period	1443; Shōgi Rokushu no Zushiki	
Maka dai dai shogi	19×19	96	50	76	15th century; Muromachi period	1443; Shōgi Rokushu no Zushiki	Occasionally played, though with altered rules.
Tai shogi	25×25	177	93	101	15th century; Muromachi period	1443; Shōgi Rokushu no Zushiki	
Taikyoku shogi	36×36	402	208	300	Edo period	1694; Shōgi Zushiki	

Of the historical large-board variants, only wa (11×11), chu (12×12), tenjiku (16×16), and maka dai dai shogi (19×19) have gained a limited following today. There is a society for chu shogi in Japan, as well as some efforts to revive maka dai dai shogi, though both efforts have changed the rules slightly from the historical ones – more significantly for maka dai dai shogi, unlike for chu shogi whose former popularity still lies within living memory. Tenjiku shogi gained some Western following around the turn of the millennium, although not with the historical rules.

Development of Shogi Variants

Heian shogi 平安将棋
Heian dai shogi 平安大将棋
Dai Shogi 大将棋
Chu Shogi 中将棋	Dai dai shogi 大大将棋	Tenjiku shogi 天竺大将棋	Wa Shogi 和将棋
Sho shogi 小将棋	Maka dai dai shogi 摩訶大大将棋
Shogi 将棋	Tai Shogi 泰将棋
Taikyoku Shogi 大局将棋

== Modern variants ==
These are some of the new and old shogi variants which have been invented. Time will show which if any of the many recently invented variants stand the test of usage and competition from other games, and stay in use.

=== Small variants ===
Name	Board size	Pieces each	When invented	Invented by	Notes
9 grid shogi	3×3	Various	2016	Teruichi Aono	Uses 40 different piece combinations and start positions. The first and last rank are the promotion zones. All other rules are the same as the traditional shogi. Designed to teach shogi. Its name in Japanese is 9マス将棋 kyu-masu shogi.
Dobutsu shogi	3×4	4		Madoka Kitao	Children's game. Also sold as "Let's Catch the Lion!"
Micro shogi	4×5	5	Modern, but before 1982	Ōyama Yasuharu?	Pieces alternate between promoted and demoted state after each capturing move.
Mini shogi	5×5	6	~1970	Shigenobu Kusumoto	He may have rediscovered it instead of inventing it. Comparatively popular.
Kyoto shogi	5×5	5	~1976	Tamiya Katsuya	Pieces alternate between promoted and demoted state after each time they are moved.
Goro goro shogi	5×6	8			Each player's promotion zone consists of the two farthest ranks from the player. There are also no long-range pieces such as rooks and bishops, although there is a variant where each player has a knight and a lance.
Judkins shogi	6×6	7	Before April 1998	Paul Judkins of Norwich, England	
Whale shogi	6×6	12	1981	R. Wayne Schmittberger of USA	All pieces named after cetaceans.
Tori shogi	7×7	16	Late 18th century	Toyota Genryu	All pieces named after birds. Uses the drop rule. One of the more popular shogi variants.
Yari shogi	7×9	14	1981	Christian Freeling, Netherlands	Except for the general (king) and the pawn, all pieces have a strong emphasis on their vertical movement, like that of the shogi lance.
EuroShogi	8×8	16	After 2000	Vladimír Pribylinec	Pieces are two colored cubes with chess symbols. A rotation of the man promotes the unit or changes its colour.
Ogi	8×8	18	After 2000	Cyril Veltin	This version introduces the princess piece.

=== Standard-size variants ===
Name	Board Size	Pieces each	When invented	Invented by	Notes
Eight-directional knight shogi	9×9	20	Early 20th century	Unknown	Shogi with knight that can jump in all eight directions (八方桂). When it promotes, it gains additional power of gold general.
Cannon shogi	9×9	20	February 1998	Peter Michaelsen	Shogi plus xiangqi-type and Janggi-type cannons.
Hasami shogi	9×9	9 or 18			Like ludus latrunculorum. Not much like shogi.
Hand shogi	9×9	19 pieces	Early 1997	John William Brown, Lewisville, Arizona	Starts with 10 pieces each side in hand.
Annan shogi	9×9	20			A Korean variation of standard shogi where pieces gain the powers of the pieces behind them. Popular in Japan.
Unashogi	9×9	20	1994	Edward Jackman	Starts with all pieces in hand.
Masonic shogi	9×9	20	1987	George R. Dekle, Sr.	Ranks indented like brickwork, adapted moves; otherwise like shogi.
Hexshogi	85 cells	20	1986	George R. Dekle, Sr.	Hexagonal cells, adapted moves; otherwise like shogi.
Trishogi	9×10	20	1987	George R. Dekle, Sr.	Triangular cells, adapted moves; otherwise same as shogi.

=== Large variants ===
Name	Board size	Pieces each	Piece types	Different moves	When invented	Invented by
Okisaki shogi	10×10	22	9	11	~1996	Masayuki Nakayachi
Great whale shogi	11×11	28	17 (Note: 27 when including calves that move identically but promote differently)	28	1981	R. Wayne Schmittberger
Ko shogi	19×19	90	34	53	Late 17th century; Edo period	Ogyū Sorai (attributed) Based partly on xiangqi and projectile weapons.

The most recent traditional large board variant is ko shogi (廣将棋 or 廣象棋 "wide shogi", 19×19), which is played on a go board and incorporates elements of Chinese chess. Ko shogi is unusual for the interdependence of its pieces and the complex rules of promotion, but likewise there is no evidence that it was ever played.

=== Multiplayer variants ===
Name	Board size	Pieces each	When invented	Invented by	Notes
Sannin shogi	7×7×7 hexagonal	18	~1930	Tanigasaki Jisuke	For three players
Yonin shogi	9×9	9	1993	Ota Mitsuyasu	For four players

=== One-dimensional variants ===
Name	Board size	Pieces each	When invented	Invented by	Notes
Ito shogi	1×31	7	2007, updated 2022	Jonathan Rutherford	Two-dimensional moves translated to a one-dimensional board

=== Three-dimensional variants ===
Name	Board size	Pieces each	When invented	Invented by	Notes
Space shogi	9×9×9	20	1987	George R. Dekle, Sr.	Orthodox shogi in a 3D gamespace
