= Wa shogi =

Wa shogi (和将棋, wa shōgi, harmony chess) is a large board variant of shogi (Japanese chess) in which all of the pieces are named for animals. It is played either with or without drops.

Because of the terse and often incomplete wording of the historical sources for the large shogi variants, except for chu shogi and to a lesser extent dai shogi (which were at some points of time the most prestigious forms of shogi being played), the historical rules of wa shogi are not clear. Different sources differ significantly in the moves attributed to the pieces. Presented here are the piece movements that are somewhat standard among modern players of wa shogi, among which the game is played with drops.

== Rules of the game ==
=== Objective ===
The objective of the game is to capture your opponent's crane king.

=== Game equipment ===
Two players, Black and White (or 先手 sente and 後手 gote), play on a board ruled into a grid of 11 ranks (rows) by 11 files (columns). The squares are undifferentiated by marking or color.

Each player has a set of 27 wedge-shaped pieces, of slightly different sizes. From largest to smallest (most to least powerful) they are:

- 1 crane king
- 1 cloud eagle
- 1 flying falcon
- 1 swallow's wings
- 1 treacherous fox
- 1 running rabbit
- 1 violent wolf
- 1 violent stag
- 1 flying goose
- 1 flying cock
- 1 strutting crow
- 1 swooping owl
- 1 blind dog
- 1 climbing monkey
- 1 liberated horse
- 1 oxcart
- 11 sparrow pawns

Each piece has its name in the form of two kanji marked on its face. On the reverse side of each piece (other than crane kings, cloud eagles and treacherous foxes) are two other characters, often in a different color (e.g., red instead of black); this reverse side is turned up to indicate that the piece has been promoted during play. The pieces of the two sides do not differ in color, but instead each piece is shaped like a wedge, and faces forward, toward the opposing side. This shows who controls the piece during play.

=== Setup ===
11	10	9	8	7	6	5	4	3	2	1
風 馬	登 猿	鴟 行	鶏 飛	猛 鹿	靏 玉	猛 狼	鳫 飛	烏 行	盲 犬	牛 車	一
	雲 鷲				燕 羽				飛 鷹		二
萑 歩	萑 歩	萑 歩	走 兎	萑 歩	萑 歩	萑 歩	隠 狐	萑 歩	萑 歩	萑 歩	三
			萑 歩				萑 歩				四
											五
											六
											七
			萑 歩				萑 歩				八
萑 歩	萑 歩	萑 歩	隠 狐	萑 歩	萑 歩	萑 歩	走 兎	萑 歩	萑 歩	萑 歩	九
	飛 鷹				燕 羽				雲 鷲		十
牛 車	盲 犬	烏 行	鳫 飛	猛 狼	靏 玉	猛 鹿	鶏 飛	鴟 行	登 猿	風 馬	十 一

11	10	9	8	7	6	5	4	3	2	1
LH	CM	SO	FC	VS	CK	VW	FG	SC	BD	OC	a
	CE				SW				FF		b
SP	SP	SP	RR	SP	SP	SP	TF	SP	SP	SP	c
			SP				SP				d
											e
											f
											g
			SP				SP				h
SP	SP	SP	TF	SP	SP	SP	RR	SP	SP	SP	i
	FF				SW				CE		j
OC	BD	SC	FG	VW	CK	VS	FC	SO	CM	LH	k

Each side places his pieces in the positions shown below, pointing toward the opponent.

- In the rank nearest the player:
  - The crane king is placed in the center file.
  - The violent wolf is placed in the adjacent file to the left of the crane king.
  - The violent stag is placed in the file to the right of the crane king.
  - The flying goose is placed in the file to the left of the violent wolf.
  - The flying cock is placed in the file to the right of the violent stag.
  - The strutting crow is placed in the file to the left of the flying goose.
  - The swooping owl is placed in the file to the right of the flying cock.
  - The blind dog is placed in the file to the left of the strutting crow.
  - The climbing monkey is placed in the file to the right of the swooping owl.
  - The oxcart is placed in the corner file to the left of the blind dog.
  - The liberated horse is placed in the corner file to the right of the climbing monkey.

That is, the first rank is:

OC	BD	SC	FG	VW	CK	VS	FC	SO	CM	LH

- In the second rank, each player places:
  - The swallow's wings in the same file as the crane king.
  - The flying falcon in the same file as the blind dog.
  - The cloud eagle in the same file as the climbing monkey.
- In the third rank, each player places:
  - The treacherous fox in the same file as the flying goose.
  - The running rabbit in the same file as the flying cock.
  - Nine sparrow pawns are placed in the remaining files.
- In the fourth rank, each player places:
  - A sparrow pawn in the same file as the treacherous fox.
  - A sparrow pawn in the same file as the running rabbit.

=== Game play ===
The players alternate making a move, with Black moving first. (The traditional terms 'black' and 'white' are used to differentiate the sides during discussion of the game, but are no longer literally descriptive.) A move consists of moving a single piece on the board and potentially promoting that piece or displacing (capturing) an opposing piece. Each of these options is detailed below.

=== Movement and capture ===
An opposing piece is captured by displacement: That is, if a piece moves to a square occupied by an opposing piece, the opposing piece is displaced and removed from the board. A piece cannot move to a square occupied by a friendly piece (meaning another piece controlled by the moving player).

Each piece on the game moves in a characteristic pattern. Pieces move either orthogonally (that is, forward, backward, left, or right, in the direction of one of the arms of a plus sign, +), or diagonally (in the direction of one of the arms of a multiplication sign, ×).

If an oxcart or sparrow pawn, which cannot retreat or move aside, advances across the board until it can no longer move, it must promote.

Many pieces are capable of several kinds of movement, with the type of movement most often depending on the direction in which they move. The movement categories are:

==== Step movers ====
Some pieces move only one square at a time. (If a friendly piece occupies an adjacent square, the moving piece may not move in that direction; if an opposing piece is there, it may be displaced and captured.)

The step movers are the crane king, violent wolf, violent stag, blind dog, climbing monkey, flying goose, flying cock, strutting crow, swooping owl and the 9 sparrow pawns on each side.

==== Limited ranging piece ====
The liberated horse and cloud eagle can move along a limited number (2 or 3) of free (empty) squares along a straight line in a certain directions. Other than the limited distance, they move like ranging pieces (see below).

==== Jumping piece ====
The treacherous fox can jump, that is, it can pass over any intervening piece, whether friend or foe, with no effect on either.

==== Ranging pieces ====
Many pieces can move any number of empty squares along a straight line, limited only by the edge of the board. If an opposing piece intervenes, it may be captured by moving to that square and removing it from the board. A ranging piece must stop where it captures, and cannot bypass a piece that is in its way. If a friendly piece intervenes, the moving piece is limited to a distance that stops short of the intervening piece; if the friendly piece is adjacent, it cannot move in that direction at all.

The ranging pieces are the cloud eagle, flying falcon, running rabbit, swallow's wings, liberated horse and oxcart.

=== Promotion ===
A player's promotion zone consists of the three farthest ranks, at the original line of the opponent's treacherous fox, running rabbit and beyond. If a piece crosses the board within the promotion zone, including moves into, out of, or wholly within the zone then that player may choose to promote the piece at the end of the turn. Promotion is effected by turning the piece over after it moves, revealing the name of its promoted rank.

Promoting a piece has the effect of changing how that piece moves.

=== Individual pieces ===
Below are diagrams indicating each piece's movement. Pieces are paired with their promotion, except for the crane king and cloud eagle which do not promote. Pieces with a grey heading start out in the game; those with a blue heading only appear on the board after promotion. Pieces with an asterisk ("*") only appear as promoted pieces. Betza's funny notation has been included in brackets for easier reference.

Notation
○	Steps a limited number of squares
☆	Jumps to a non-adjacent square, bypassing any intervening piece
│	Ranges along a straight line, crossing any number of empty squares
─	Ranges along a straight line, crossing any number of empty squares
╲	Ranges along a straight line, crossing any number of empty squares
╱	Ranges along a straight line, crossing any number of empty squares

Crane King 靏玉 kakugyoku	Cloud Eagle 雲鷲 unjū
Step: The crane king can step one square in any direction, orthogonal or diagonal. (K): ○ / ○ / ○; ○ / 靏 / ○; ○ / ○ / ○	Ranging: The cloud eagle can move any number of free squares directly forward or backward. Limited range: It can move one, two or three squares diagonally forward. Step: It can step one square orthogonally sideways or diagonally backward. (fbRfB3K): ○ / / / │ / / / ○; / ○ / / │ / / ○; / / ○ / │ / ○; / / ○ / 鷲 / ○; / / ○ / │ / ○; / / / │
Treacherous Fox 隠狐 inko, onko	
Step: The treacherous fox can move one square in the four diagonal directions; or, it can move one square orthogonally forward or backward. Jump: It can jump to the second square in those directions. (fbWFfbDA): ☆ / / ☆ / / ☆; / ○ / ○ / ○; / / 狐; / ○ / ○ / ○; ☆ / / ☆ / / ☆	The treacherous fox does not promote.
Flying Falcon 飛鷹 hiyō	*Tenacious Falcon 鶏鷹 keiyō
Range: The flying falcon can move any number of free squares along any of the four diagonal directions. Step: It can step one square forward. (fWB): ╲ / / / / ╱; / ╲ / ○ / ╱; / / 鷹; / ╱ / / ╲; ╱ / / / / ╲	Range: The tenacious falcon can move any number of free squares in all four diagonal directions; or, it can move any number of free squares directly forward or backward. Step: It can move one square orthogonally sideways. (fbRBW): ╲ / / │ / / ╱; / ╲ / │ / ╱; / ○ / / ○; / ╱ / │ / ╲; ╱ / / │ / / ╲
Running Rabbit 走兎 sōto	Treacherous fox 隠狐 inko, onko
Range: The running rabbit can move any number of free squares straight forward. Step: It can step one square in one of the four diagonal directions; or, one square straight backward. (fRFbW): / │; ○ / │ / ○; / 兎; ○ / ○ / ○	Step: The treacherous fox can move one square in the four diagonal directions; or, it can move one square orthogonally forward or backward. Jump: It can jump to the second square in those directions. (fbWFfbDA): ☆ / / ☆ / / ☆; / ○ / ○ / ○; / / 狐; / ○ / ○ / ○; ☆ / / ☆ / / ☆
Violent Wolf 猛狼 mōrō	*Bear's Eyes 熊眼 yūgan
Step: The violent wolf can step one square in one of the four orthogonal directions; or, one square diagonally forward, giving it six possibilities. (WfF): ○ / ○ / ○; ○ / 狼 / ○; / ○	Step: The bear's eyes can step one square in any direction, orthogonal or diagonal. (K): ○ / ○ / ○; ○ / 熊 / ○; ○ / ○ / ○
Violent Stag 猛鹿 mōroku	*Roaming Boar 行猪 gyōcho
Step: The violent stag can step one square in one of the four diagonal directions; or, one square straight forward, giving it five possibilities. (FfW): ○ / ○ / ○; / 鹿; ○ / / ○	Step: The roaming boar can step one square in any direction, orthogonal or diagonal, except directly backward. (FfrlW): ○ / ○ / ○; ○ / 猪 / ○; ○ / / ○
Blind Dog 盲犬 mōken	Violent Wolf 猛狼 mōrō
Step: The blind dog can step one square orthogonally sideways, directly backward, or diagonally forward. (fFrlbW): ○ / / ○; ○ / 犬 / ○; / ○	Step: The violent wolf can step one square in one of the four orthogonal directions; or, one square diagonally forward, giving it six possibilities. (WfF): ○ / ○ / ○; ○ / 狼 / ○; / ○
Climbing Monkey 登猿 tōen	Violent Stag 猛鹿 mōroku
Step: The climbing monkey can step one square directly forward or backward, or one square diagonally forward, giving it four possibilities. (fFfbW): ○ / ○ / ○; / 猿; / ○	Step: The violent stag can step one square in one of the four diagonal directions; or, one square straight forward, giving it five possibilities. (FfW): ○ / ○ / ○; / 鹿; ○ / / ○
Flying Goose 鳫飛 ganhi	Swallow's Wings 燕羽 en'u
Step: The flying goose can step one square directly forward or backward, or one square diagonally forward, giving it four possibilities. (fFfbW): ○ / ○ / ○; / 鳫; / ○	Range: The swallow's wings can move any number of free squares orthogonally sideways. Step: It can move one square orthogonally forward or backward. (WrlR): / / ○; ─ / ─ / 燕 / ─ / ─; / / ○
Flying Cock 鶏飛 keihi	*Raiding Falcon 延鷹 en’yō
Step: The flying cock can step one square orthogonally sideways or diagonally forward. (fFrlW): ○ / / ○; ○ / 鶏 / ○	Range: The raiding falcon can move any number of free squares orthogonally forward or backward. Step: It can step one square orthogonally sideways or diagonally forward. (fbRWfF): / │; ○ / │ / ○; ○ / 延 / ○; / │; / │
Swallow's Wings 燕羽 en'u	*Gliding Swallow 燕行 engyō
Range: The swallow's wings can move any number of free squares orthogonally sideways. Step: It can move one square orthogonally forward or backward. (WrlR): / / ○; ─ / ─ / 燕 / ─ / ─; / / ○	Range: The gliding swallow can move any number of free squares along any of the four orthogonal directions. (R): / / │; / / │; ─ / ─ / 行 / ─ / ─; / / │; / / │
Strutting Crow 烏行 ukō	Flying Falcon 飛鷹 hiyō
Step: The strutting crow can step one square directly forward or diagonally backward, giving it three possibilities. (fWbF): / ○; / 烏; ○ / / ○	Range: The flying falcon can move any number of free squares along any of the four diagonal directions. Step: It can step one square forward. (fWB): ╲ / / / / ╱; / ╲ / ○ / ╱; / / 鷹; / ╱ / / ╲; ╱ / / / / ╲
Swooping Owl 鴟行 shigyō	Cloud Eagle 雲鷲 unjū
Step: The swooping owl can step one square directly forward or diagonally backward, giving it three possibilities. (fWbF): / ○; / 鴟; ○ / / ○	Ranging: The cloud eagle can move any number of free squares directly forward or backward. Limited range: It can move one, two or three squares diagonally forward. (fbRfB3K) Step: It can step one square orthogonally sideways or diagonally backward.: ○ / / / │ / / / ○; / ○ / / │ / / ○; / / ○ / │ / ○; / / ○ / 鷲 / ○; / / ○ / │ / ○; / / / │
Liberated Horse 風馬 fūma	*Heavenly Horse 天馬 temma
Range: The liberated horse can move any number of free squares along the forward orthogonal. Limited range: It can step one or two squares directly backward. (fRbR2): │; │; 風; ○; ○	Jump: The heavenly horse jumps at an angle intermediate between orthogonal and diagonal, amounting to one square forward plus one square diagonally forward; or, one square backward plus one square diagonally backward in a single motion, ignoring any intervening piece. (fbN): ☆ / / ☆; / 天; ☆ / / ☆
Oxcart 牛車 gissha	*Plodding Ox 歬牛 sengyū
Range: The oxcart can move any number of free squares straight forward. An oxcart that reaches the furthest rank must promote. (fR): │; │; 車	Step: The plodding ox can step one square in any direction, orthogonal or diagonal. (K): ○ / ○ / ○; ○ / 牛 / ○; ○ / ○ / ○
Sparrow Pawn 萑歩 jakufu	*Golden Bird 金鳥 kinchō
Step: The sparrow pawn can step one square forward. (fW) A sparrow pawn that reaches the furthest rank must promote.: ○; 歩	Step: The golden bird can step one square in one of the four orthogonal directions; or, one square diagonally forward, giving it six possibilities. (WfF): ○ / ○ / ○; ○ / 金 / ○; / ○

=== Drops ===
Descriptions of wa shogi from historical texts make no mention that drops were ever used; however, many people in modern times enjoy playing this game with drops. Promoted pieces with the same move (VW/GB and BE/PO) have different names, which suggests the game used drops after demotion on capture, as otherwise these pieces would be fully equivalent, and there would be no need to distinguish them. The rules pertaining to drops are usually based on modern shogi.

=== Check and mate ===
When a player makes a move such that the opponent's crane king could be captured on the following move, the move is said to give check to the crane king; the crane king is said to be in check. If a player's crane king is in check and no legal move by that player will get the crane king out of check, the checking move is also mate, and effectively wins the game.

A player is not allowed to give perpetual check, and loses if he does so.

=== Game end ===
A player who captures the opponent's crane king wins the game. In practice this rarely happens, as a player will resign when checkmated, as otherwise when loss is inevitable.

A player who makes an illegal move loses immediately. (This rule may be relaxed in casual games.)

There are two other possible (but fairly uncommon) ways for a game to end: repetition (千日手 sennichite) and impasse (持将棋 jishōgi).

If the same position occurs four times with the same player to play, then the game is no contest. (Recall, however, the prohibition against perpetual check.) For two positions to be considered the same, the pieces in hand must be the same, as well as the position on the board.

The game reaches an impasse if both crane kings stand well fortified in their respective promotion zones (when played with drops) or when players run out of material (without drops), so that neither player can hope to mate the other or to gain any further material.

== Game notation ==
The method used in English-language texts to express shogi moves was established by George Hodges in 1976. It is derived from the algebraic notation used for chess, but differs in several respects. Modifications have been made for wa shogi.

A typical example is SP-8f. The first letter represents the piece moved: SP = sparrow pawn, OC = oxcart, LH = liberated horse, CM = climbing monkey, BD = blind dog, SO = swooping owl, SC = strutting crow, FC = flying cock, FG = flying goose, VS = violent stag, VW = violent wolf, RR = running rabbit, TF = treacherous fox, SW = swallow's wings, FF = flying falcon, CE = cloud eagle and, CK = crane king.

Promoted pieces have a + added in front of the letter e.g., +SP for a golden bird (promoted sparrow pawn).

The designation of the piece is followed by a symbol indicating the type of move: - for an ordinary move or x for a capture.

Next is the designation for the square on which the piece lands. This consists of a number representing the file and a lowercase letter representing the rank, with 1a being the top right corner (as seen from Black's point of view) and 11k being the bottom left corner. (This method of designating squares is based on Japanese convention, which, however, uses Japanese numerals instead of letters. For example, the square 2c is denoted by 2三 in Japanese.)

If a move entitles the player to promote the piece, then a + is added to the end to signify that the promotion was taken, or an = to indicate that it was declined. For example, FFx7c= indicates a flying falcon capturing on 7c without promoting.

In cases where the above notation would be ambiguous, the designation of the start square is added after the designation for the piece in order to make clear which piece is meant. This can only apply to golden birds.

Moves are commonly numbered as in chess.

== Postal Wa Shogi World Championship ==
In 1994, the American poet and variant chess player Victor Contoski organised a first World Wa Shogi Championship by correspondence, which brought together 12 players from France, the USA, Great Britain, Ireland, Italy and Belgium. The outcome is uncertain. Title could have been disputed between Francis Fahys and the game inventor Wayne Schmittberger in the early 2000s. A few games from this tournament can be viewed on the heterochess.net website.

== See also ==
- Shogi variant
- Tori shogi
- Chu shogi
- Heian dai shogi
- Dai shogi
- Tenjiku shogi
- Dai dai shogi
- Maka dai dai shogi
- Tai shogi
- Taikyoku shogi
