= History of shogi =

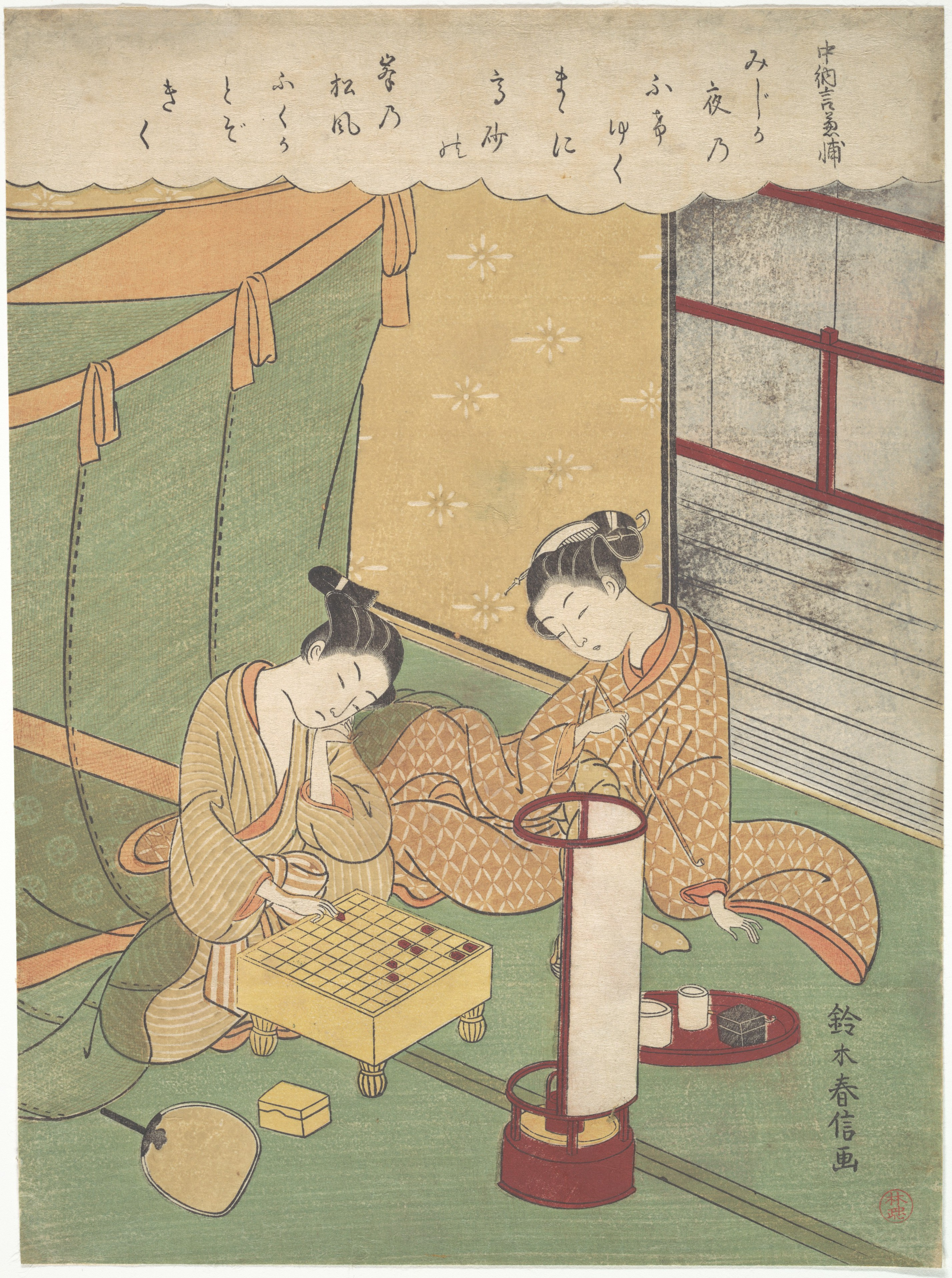
A Young Woman and Man Playing Shōgi (Japanese Chess), print by Chūnagon Kanesuke.

Shogi (将棋, “general’s game”) is a Japanese two-player strategy board game which is the most popular chess game in Japan. Like other members of the chess family, shogi shares a common ancestry with Indian chaturanga and Chinese xiangqi.

The origins of shogi are traced to the transmission of early chess forms to East Asia by the first millennium, with evidence for distinct Japanese variants emerging by the Heian period (794–1185). Several large-board and experimental forms were played in medieval Japan, including chu shogi and dai shogi and other expanded variants. The classic rules and strategies of modern shogi were standardized during the Muromachi period (1336–1573) by the four shogi houses, which were officially supported by the shogunate. Over subsequent centuries the game became institutionalized, and in the modern era professional organizations, title systems, and formal ranking structures were established. Today shogi is played by millions in Japan, supported by a developed professional circuit and a substantial body of recorded games and theoretical literature.

== Arrival in Japan ==
It is not clear when the ancestral chess-type game that later developed into shogi was brought to Japan. This is in contrast to the game of go, which was almost certainly brought to Japan in or around the Nara period, since a go board is stored in the treasury of Shōsōin (正倉院). There are tales that relate that it was invented by Yuwen Yong of Northern Zhou, and that Kibi Makibi (吉備真備) brought it back after visiting the country of Tang, but both these tales are likely to have been invented at the start of the Edo period by those keen to make a name for themselves as authorities on shogi.

There are several theories about when shogi spread to Japan, but the earliest plausible date is around the 6th century. It is thought that the pieces used in the shogi of the time were not the current five-sided pieces, but three-dimensional figures, as were used in chaturanga. This parallels the changes in chess pieces, which are more representational and less abstract than those made earlier. However, a large problem with this theory is that as pieces in this form have never been found, let alone stored in the treasury of Shōsōin, there is little physical evidence supporting it.

Another theory gives a later date, stating that shogi was brought to Japan after the start of the Nara period.

The central position of the king (with nine columns), flat pieces with characters on them, and a pawn capturing straight forward resemble Chinese chess (xiangqi), but many other elements of shogi differ from xiangqi. For instance, in shogi pieces play on squares rather than intersections, there is a complete pawn line on the third rank, they promote to the piece beside the king (i.e. the gold general) and do so by entering the enemy camp, and the knight can jump. All this differs from Chinese chess, but resembles the games of makruk from Thailand and Cambodia and sittuyin from Myanmar; these also have an elephant which moves in the same way as the silver general. From the Song dynasty through the Ming dynasty, China sent great trade convoys through the southern islands and all around the Indian Ocean and also traded with Japan, so elements of South Asian chess could have reached Japan. Shogi might thus combine strands from Chinese and Southeast Asian chess.

See also the history of chess.

== Heian period shogi ==
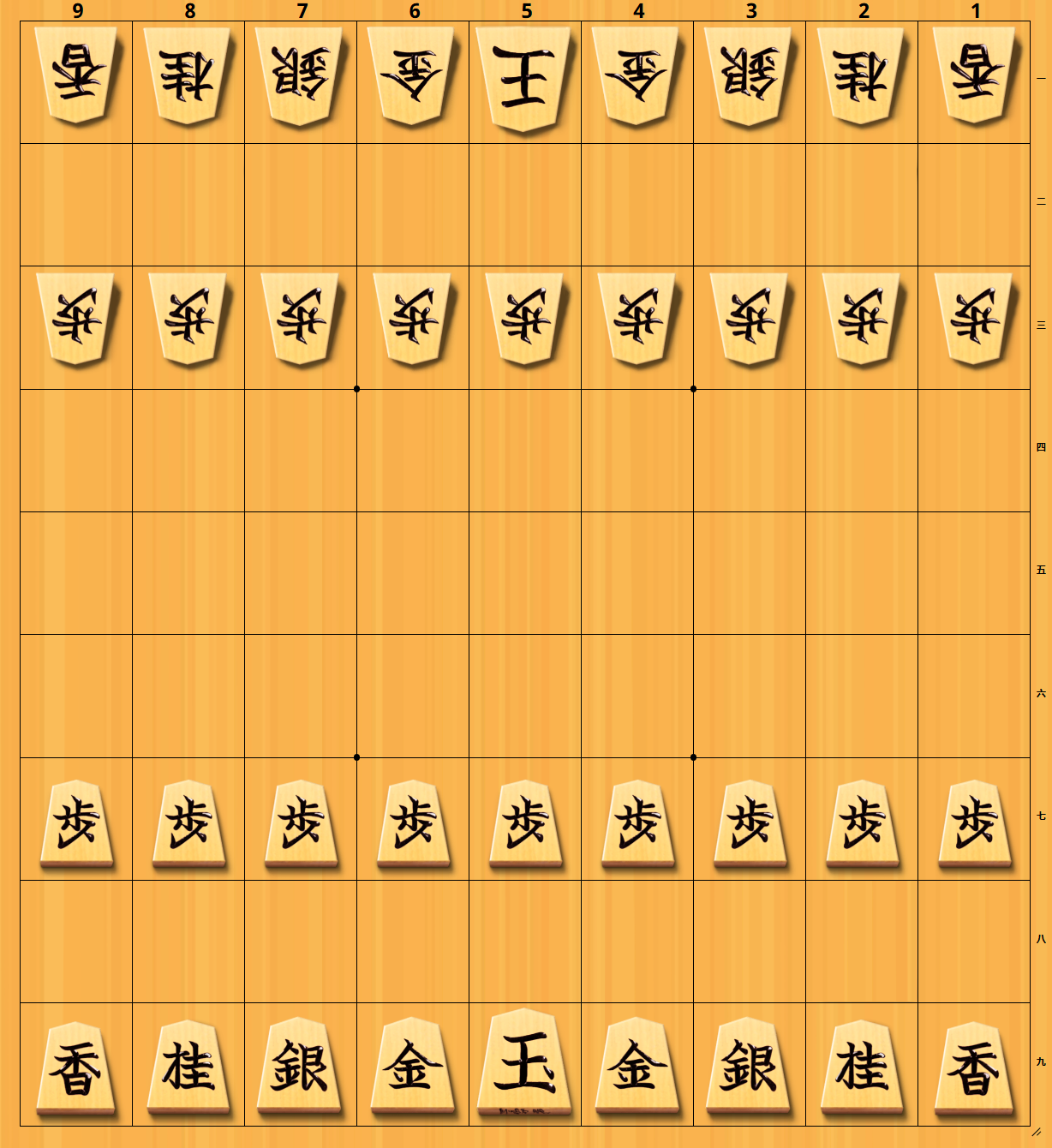
Starting position of the 9x9 Heian shogi. The game was played without drops and did not use bishops or rooks.

One of the oldest documents indicating the existence of shogi is Kirinshō (麒麟抄), written by Fujiwara Yukinari (藤原行成) (972 - 1027), a seven-volume work which contains a description of how to write the characters used for shogi pieces, but the most generally accepted opinion is that this section was added by a writer from a later generation. Nonetheless, it gives a revealing detail that the pieces had two characters inscribed on them, rather than one character as in xiangqi. Shin Saru Gakuki (新猿楽記) (1058–1064), written by Fujiwara Akihira also has passages relating to shogi, and is regarded as the earliest document on the subject.

The oldest archaeological evidence is a group of 16 shogi pieces excavated from the grounds of Kōfuku-ji in Nara Prefecture, and as a wooden writing plaque written on in the sixth year of Tengi (1058) was found at the same time, the pieces are thought to be of the same period. The pieces of the time appear to have been simple ones made by cutting a writing plaque and writing directly on the surface, but they have the same five-sided shape as modern pieces. The pieces found were three kings, four golds, one silver, one knight, and five pawns. As "Shin Saru Gakuki", mentioned above, is of the same period, this find is backed up by documentary evidence. Four more were found in 2013, a few feet away from the original sixteen, and of the same period: they were another knight, another pawn, an unreadable piece, and interestingly a drunk elephant (blank on the other side, so that it did not promote).

The dictionary of common folk culture, Nichūreki (二中歴), which it is estimated was created between 1210 and 1221, a collection based on the two works Shōchūreki (掌中歴) and Kaichūreki (懐中歴), thought to have been written by Miyoshi Tameyasu (三善為康), describes two forms of shogi, large (dai) shogi and small (shō) shogi. So as not to confuse these with later types of shogi, in modern times these are called Heian shogi (or Heian small shogi) and Heian dai shogi. Heian shogi is the version on which modern shogi is based, but it is written that one wins if one's opponent is reduced to a single king, apparently indicating that at the time there was no concept of pieces in the hand. However, the board size and number of pieces was not stated, so it is unknown if Heian shogi was already played on the modern 9×9 board or not. Heian great shogi was played on a 13×13 board.

The pieces used in these variants of shogi consist of those used in Heian shogi: the king, gold general, silver general, knight, lance, and pawn, and those used only in Heian great shogi: the copper general, iron general, side mover, tiger, flying dragon, free chariot and go between. The pieces of Heian shogi have their modern moves, promoting to gold when they reach the enemy three lines. According to Kōji Shimizu, chief researcher at the Archaeological Institute of Kashihara, Nara Prefecture, the names of the Heian shogi pieces keep those of chaturanga (general, elephant, horse, chariot and soldier), and add to them the five treasures of Buddhism (jewel, gold, silver, katsura tree, and incense). There is also a theory by Yoshinori Kimura that while chaturanga was from the start a game simulating war, and thus pieces were discarded once captured, Heian shogi involved pieces kept in the hand.

== Medieval shogi ==
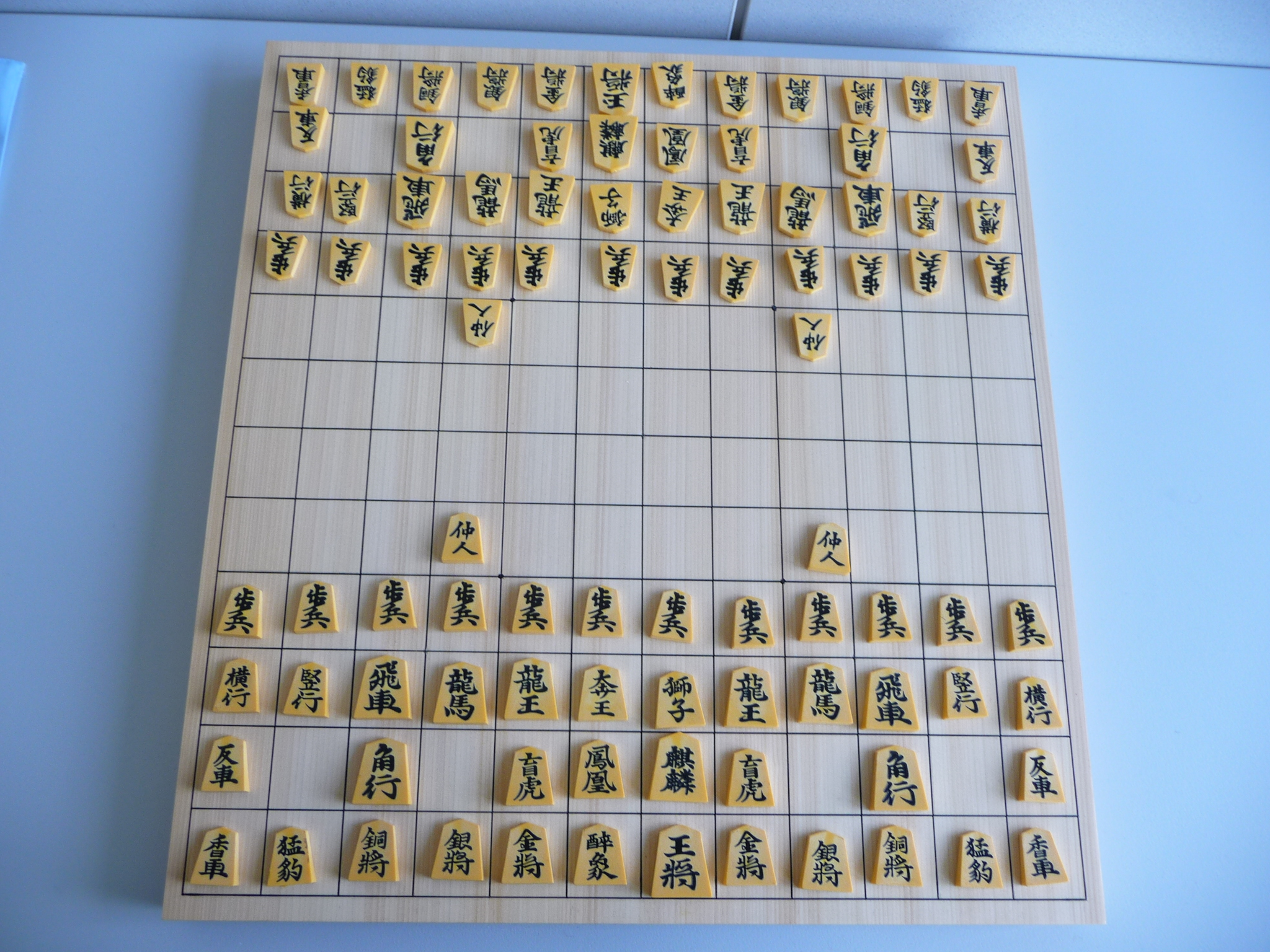
Chu Shogi Set

Earliest shogi record (1587)
☖ pieces in hand: –

9	8	7	6	5	4	3	2	1
香	桂			飛			桂	香	1
	金	王				金	銀		2
	歩	歩	歩		歩		歩		3
歩			銀		角	歩		歩	4
				歩			歩		5
歩		歩				銀		歩	6
	歩	角	歩	歩	歩	歩			7
	銀	金		玉		金	飛		8
香	桂						桂	香	9

☗ pieces in hand: –
The earliest record of a sho shogi (small shogi) game is a single position mentioned in the 家忠日記 Ietada Nikki (diary) of the Matsudaira clan dated 1587 February. The players are not known. Black appears to be playing a Static Rook position while White a Central Rook (Ranging Rook) position.

In the 14th century, the Fustu Shodoshu (a compilation by the monk Ryoki) mentions a sho shogi (small shogi) and a dai shogi (large shogi). However, only a few pieces are mentioned. For the first time, the rook is mentioned, but only in dai shogi – so that this dai shogi is not the same as the one detailed in the Nichureki. Also mentioned are the lance, reverse chariot, go-between, angry boar, and knight, which agrees with later descriptions. The game of dai shogi appears to have been much played and enjoyed in the 14th century, when it probably reached a form similar to that described in the 1443 Shogi Shushu no Zu: 65 pieces per side on a 15×15 board. (The 1443 Shogi Shushu no Zu is lost, but Minase Kanenari's 1591 book Shogi Zu states that he had copied the 1443 book, and that the 1443 book itself was a copy of an older book of which no information survives.) Soon, however, its rules were simplified (removing the weakest pieces) to produce the game of chu shogi (middle shogi), first mentioned in the mid-14th century Yugaku orai (along with dai shogi). This is played with 46 pieces per side on a 12×12 board. At some point in the 15th century, three pieces from chu shogi were added to sho shogi: the rook, bishop, and drunk elephant. This meant that sho shogi now differed from the modern form only in the presence of the drunk elephant and the absence of drops. The drunk elephant promotes to a crown prince, which acts as a second king that must be captured as well as the first one to win.

A trio of shogi games – small, middle, and large – continued to be the norm in the 15th century. Chu shogi was the most popular and held in the highest esteem, and sho shogi regarded as trivial, until the introduction of drops in the latter. Dai shogi seems to have been seen as too complicated. (Indeed, the version of dai shogi that comes down to us may not be the original, but may be a late one including influence from chu shogi. In Heian shogi, sho shogi, modern shogi, and Heian dai shogi, weak stepping pieces promote to gold; but in chu shogi, they promote to other pieces in the initial setup that cannot be obtained through promotion, like rooks and bishops. In dai shogi, the pieces available in chu shogi promote as in that game, but the remaining pieces all promote to gold. This suggests that dai shogi originally had all the weak pieces promote to gold, and that promotions from chu shogi were copied back into dai shogi when chu shogi had eclipsed dai shogi in popularity.)

It is thought that the rules of modern shogi were fixed in the 16th century, when the drunken elephant was removed from the set of pieces, and drops were introduced. This may have been inspired by mercenaries switching allegiances, and by the pentagonal shape of shogi pieces pointing towards their opponent. (The drunk elephant still exists in a sho shogi set from 1567, but not in the diary of Matsudaira Ietada in 1587. It may have been removed because its promotion to crown prince does not work well in a game with drops.) According to Shoshōgi Zushiki (諸象戯図式), a set of shogi rules published in 1696, during the Genroku period, it states that the drunken elephant piece was removed from the game of sho shogi by Emperor Go-Nara during the Tenmon period (1532–1555), but whether or not this is true is not clear.

As many as 174 shogi pieces have been excavated from the Ichijōdani Asakura Family Historic Ruins, which are thought to be from the latter half of the 16th century. Most of these pieces are pawns, but there is also one drunken elephant, leading to the hypothesis that in this period variations of shogi with and without the drunken elephant existed side by side.

The rules of standard modern shogi were first codified in the 1636 treatise Shogi Zushiki by the second Meijin Ohashi Soko. A full description of chu shogi appears in the 1663 Chu Shogi Zushiki of the third Meijin Ito Sokan.

When drops were added, the tables were turned on chu shogi; standard shogi became ascendant. Nonetheless, chu shogi continues to be played by some Japanese players even now, and its exotic pieces (including the drunk elephant and the lion, which essentially moves like a king twice per turn, thus making it able to capture twice) attract interest from all around the world.

=== Other variants ===
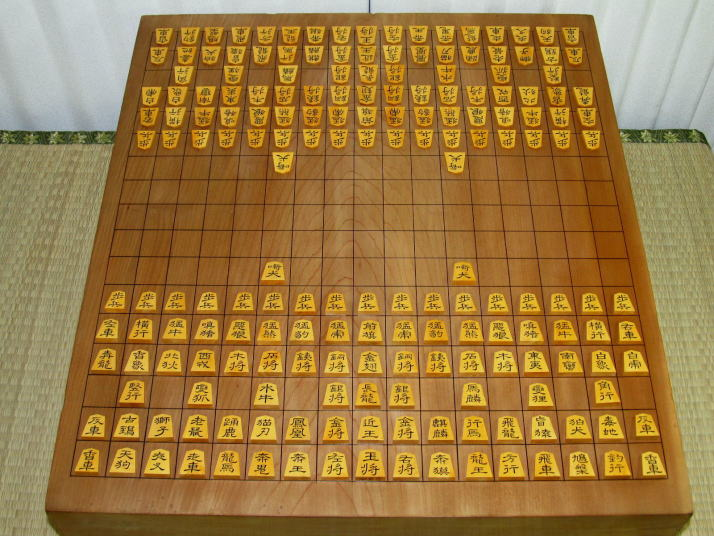
Dai dai shogi, which used the promotion by capture rule

Minase Kanenari's 1591 book Shogi Zu was itself copied as the 1811 book Shogi Rokushu no Zushiki of Tsurumine Shigenobu. Both the Shogi Zu and Shogi Rokushu no Zushiki state that they were changed once. The book contains six games: the aforementioned trio of sho, chu, and dai shogi, as well as three larger games. They are dai dai shogi (96 pieces per side on a 17×17 board), maka dai dai shogi (96 pieces per side on a 19×19 board), and tai shogi (177 pieces per side on a 25×25 board). The descriptions of these three games are signed by Minase, so they were probably invented between 1443 and 1591 and modified from the original text.

There are other 17th-century texts, the Sho Shogi Zushiki (1694) and Shogi Zushiki (not the same as Ohashi Soko's book presenting standard shogi), presenting these variants and others. The Sho Shogi Zushiki presents sho shogi (both with and without drunk elephant), wa shogi (27 pieces per side on a 11×11 board), chu shogi, dai shogi, tenjiku shogi (78 pieces per side on a 16×16 board – perhaps invented by a Buddhist monk trying to revive a form of dai shogi), dai dai shogi, maka dai dai shogi, and tai shogi. The Shogi Zushiki presents standard shogi, chu shogi, dai shogi, tenjiku shogi, dai dai shogi, maka dai dai shogi, and tai shogi, while also mentioning wa shogi, qiguo xiangqi (a Chinese variant), ko shogi (90 pieces per side, played on the 19×19 go board), and taikyoku shogi (402 pieces per side on a 36×36 board).

Although Minase manufactured a few sets of the large games (2 dai shogi sets, 2 dai dai shogi sets, 3 maka dai dai shogi sets, and 4 tai shogi sets), it is not clear if these were ever played much. The historical resources do not always agree with each other on the moves of these variants, though modern researchers have begun to construct rule sets for modern play.

The last of the historical variants is small rather than large: tori shogi, with 16 pieces a side on a 7×7 board. It is usually attributed to the ninth Meijin Ohashi Soei in 1799, though John Fairbairn claims that it is really due to his pupil Toyota Genryu in 1828. Together with chu shogi and some modern small variants, tori shogi is one of the contenders for being the most-played variant (other than standard shogi).

== Modern shogi ==
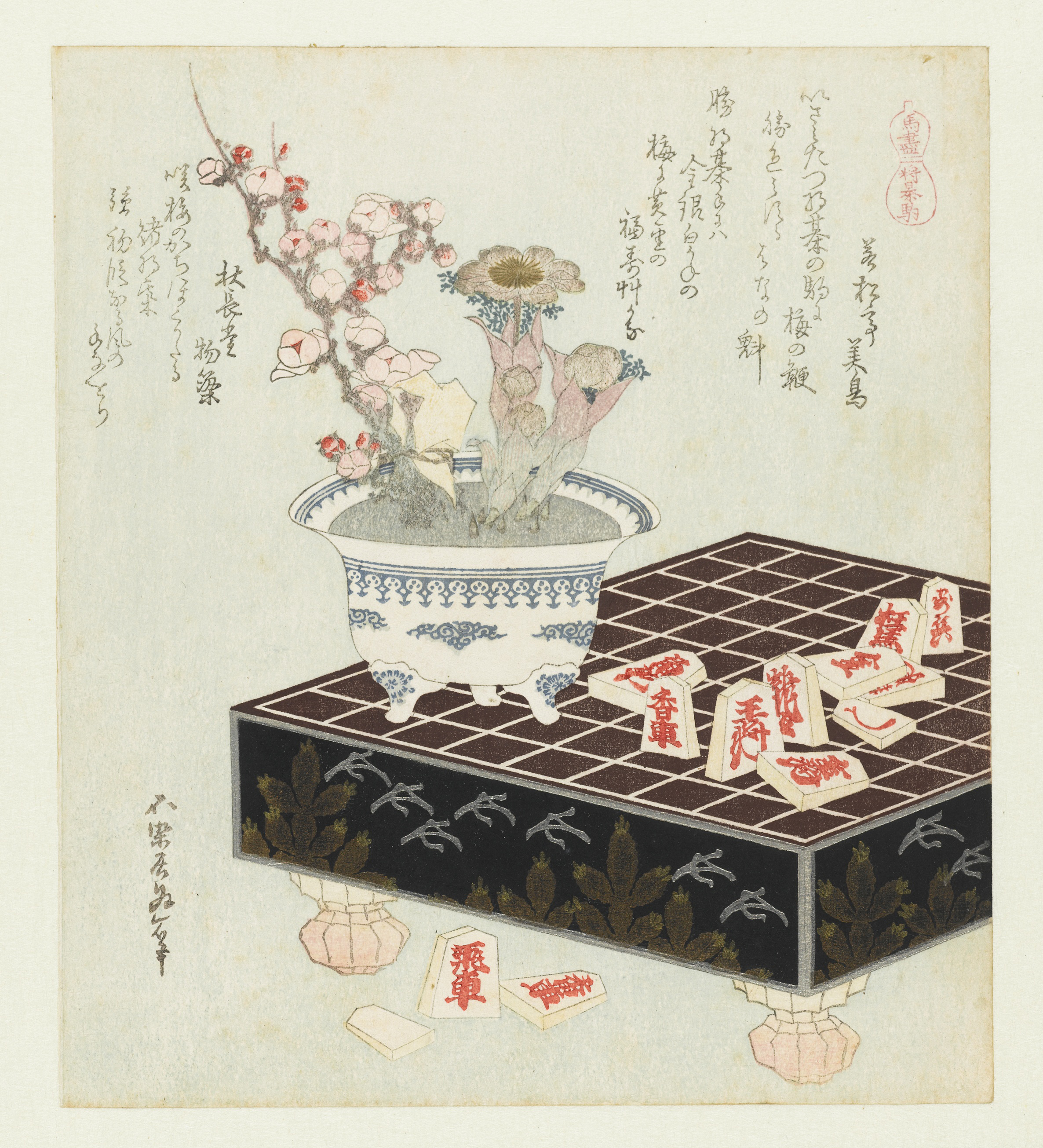
A print by Hokusai

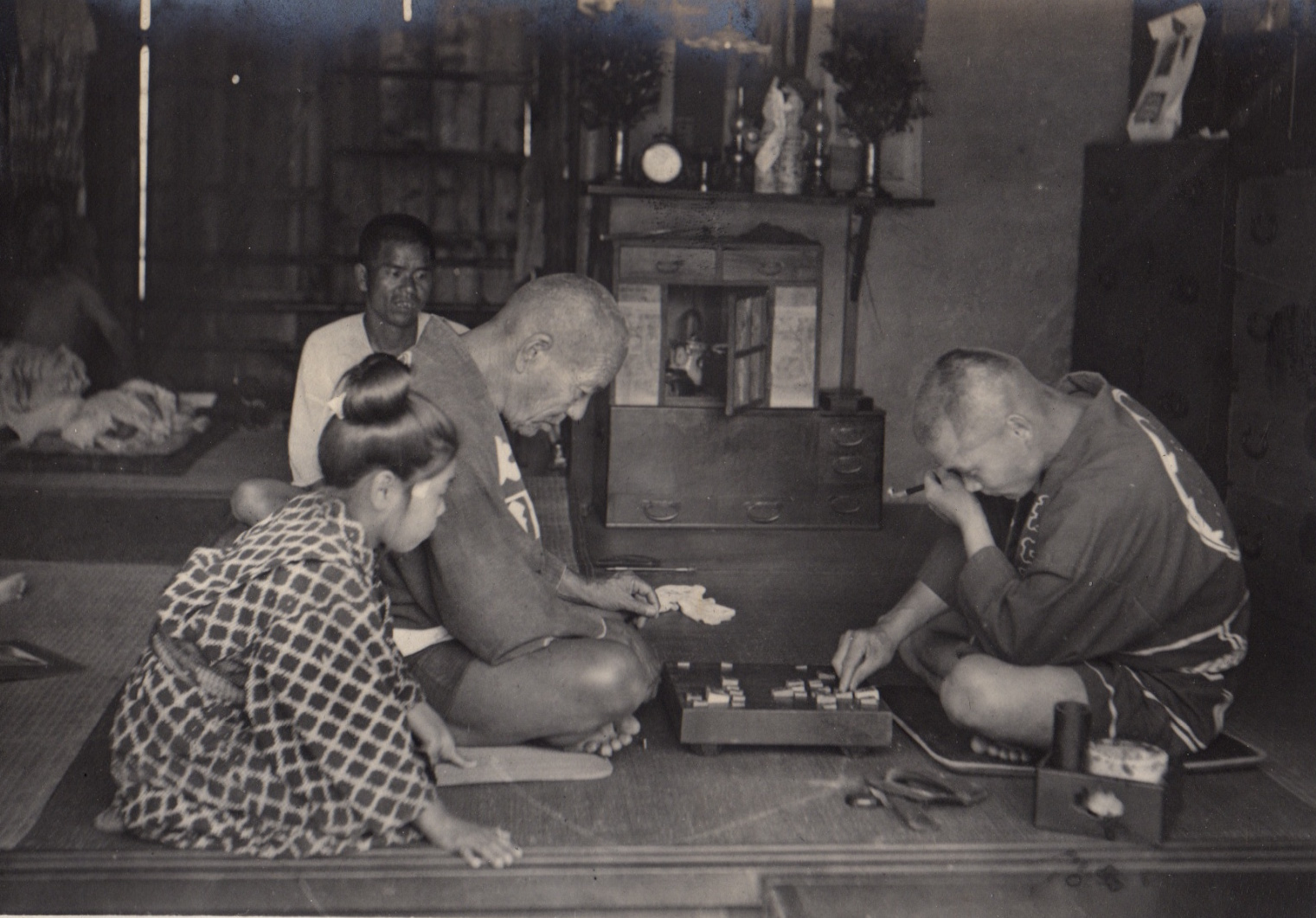
Shōgi playing in 1910s Japan

Modern shogi (hon shogi), like go, was officially approved by the Tokugawa shogunate. In 1612, the shogunate passed a law giving endowments to shogi players.

=== Newspaper shogi and the formation of shogi associations ===
After the fall of the Tokugawa shogunate, the three shogi families were no longer paid endowments, and the iemoto system in shogi lost its power. The lines of the three families ended, and the rank of meijin came to be bestowed by recommendation. The popularity of amateur shogi continued in the Meiji period, with shogi tournaments and events held all over Japan, and "front-porch shogi" (縁台将棋), played wherever people gathered, in bath houses or barber's shops. However, it is thought that, with the exception of a handful of high-ranking players at the end of the 19th century, it was impossible to make a living as a professional shogi player during this period.

From around 1899, newspapers began to publish records of shogi matches, and high-ranking players formed alliances with the aim of having their games published. In 1909, the Shogi Association (将棋同盟社) was formed, and in 1924, the Tokyo Shogi Association (東京将棋同盟社) was formed, with Kinjirō Sekine (関根金次郎), the thirteenth-generation Meijin, at its head. This was an early incarnation of the modern Japan Shogi Association (日本将棋連盟), founded in 1947.

=== The meijin system and title matches ===
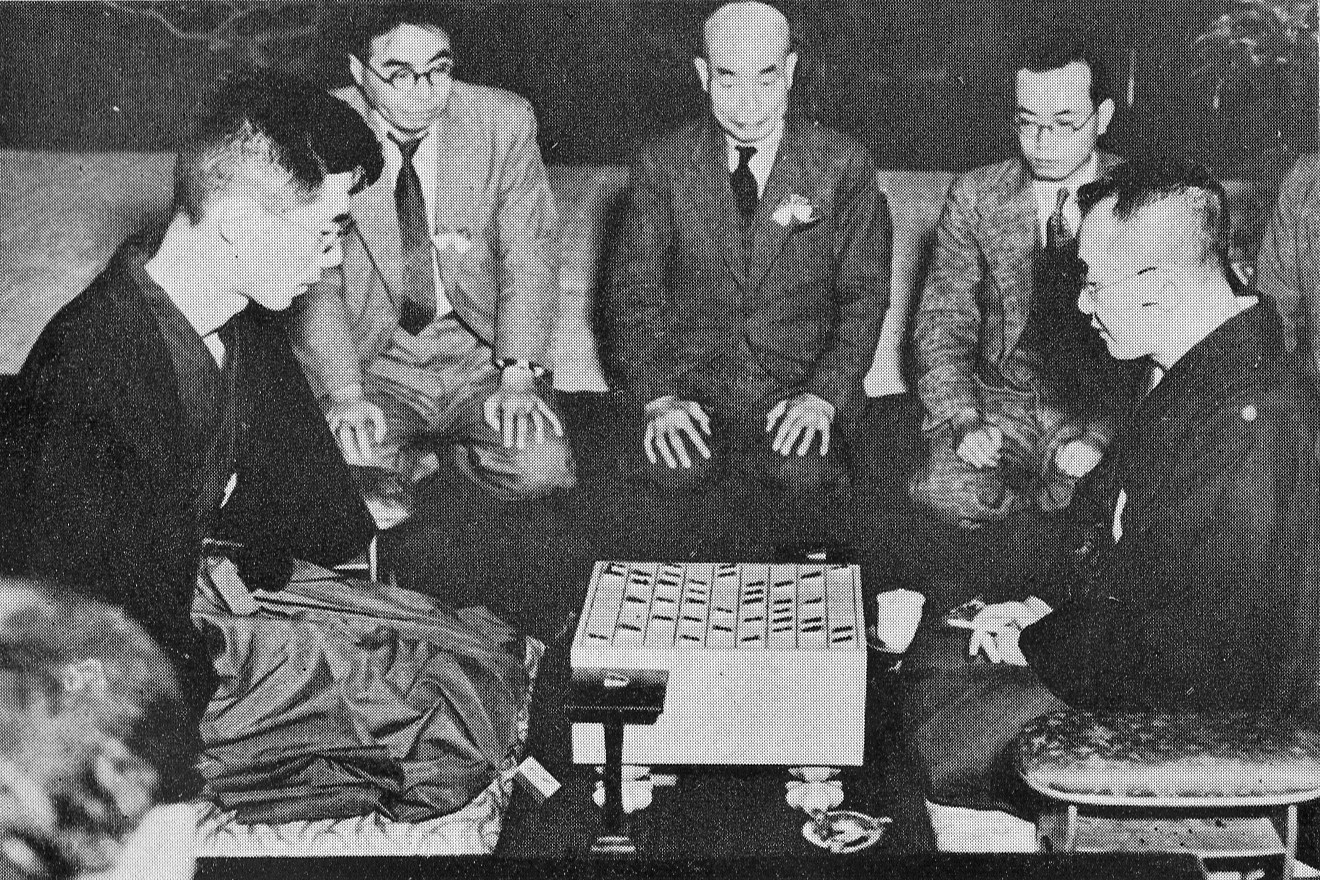
Tsukada vs Kimura, 1949

In 1935, Kinjiro Sekine stepped down from the rank of meijin, which then came to be conferred based on ability in the short term, rather than recommendation as before. The first Meijin title match (名人戦, meijin-sen) (known officially at the time as the Meijin Kettei Kisen (名人決定大棋戦)) was held over two years, with Yoshio Kimura (木村義雄) becoming the first Meijin in 1937. This was the start of the shogi title matches (see titleholder system).

Later, in 1950, the Kudan title match (九段戦, kudan-sen) (9-dan title match) (renamed the Jūdan title match (十段戦, jūdan-sen) (10-dan title match) in 1962) and the Ōshō title match (王将戦, ōshō-sen) (King title match) were founded.

The Ōza-sen (王座戦) tournament was started in 1953 and became a title match in 1983. In 1960 the Ōi title match (王位戦, ōi-sen) was founded, and later the Kisei-sen (棋聖戦) in 1962, and the Kiō-sen (棋王戦, kiō-sen) in 1974. The Jūdan-sen was changed to become the Ryūō title match (竜王戦, ryūō-sen) in 1988. The Eiō became a major title in 2017, completing the modern line-up of eight title matches.

=== The ages of Ōyama and Habu ===
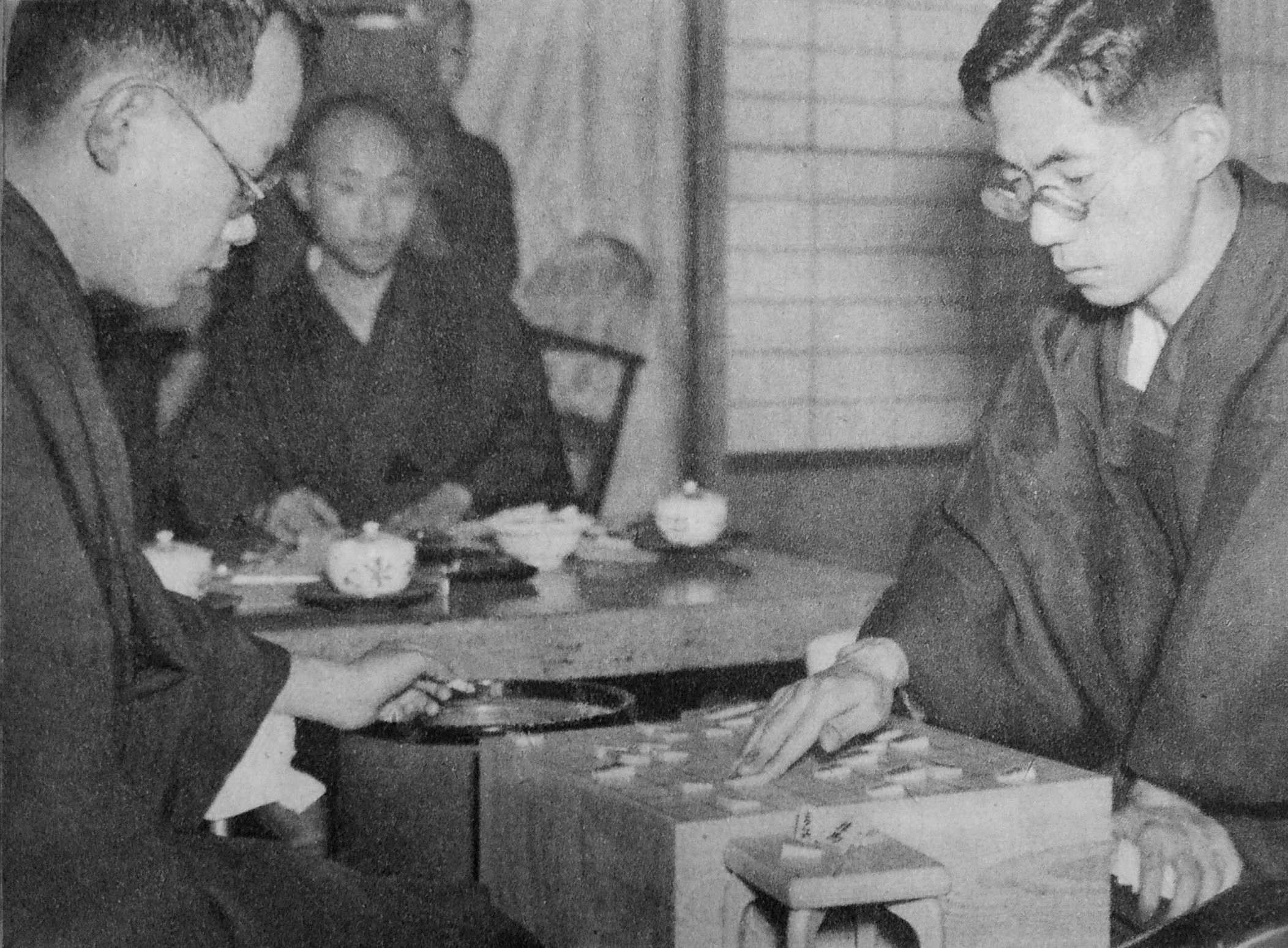
Ōyama vs Tsukada (1948)

After the Second World War, SCAP (occupational government mainly led by US) tried to eliminate all "feudal" factors from Japanese society and shogi was included in the possible list of items to be banned along with Bushido (philosophy of samurai) and other things. The reason for banning shogi for SCAP was its exceptional character as a board game seen in the usage of captured pieces. SCAP insisted that this could lead to the idea of prisoner abuse. But Kozo Masuda, then one of the top professional shogi players, when summoned to the SCAP headquarters for an investigation, criticized such understanding of shogi and insisted that it is not shogi but western chess that potentially contains the idea of prisoner abuse because it just kills the pieces of the opponent while shogi is rather democratic for giving prisoners the chance to get back into the game. Masuda also said that chess contradicts the ideal of gender equality in western society because the king shields itself behind the queen and runs away. Masuda's assertion is said to have eventually led to the exemption of shogi from the list of items to be banned.

It was considered to be nearly impossible to hold all the titles at once, but in 1957, Kōzō Masuda took all three of the titles which existed at the time (Meijin, Kudan and Ōshō), to become a triple champion (三冠王). However, another player later took these three titles from Masuda, and went on in 1959 to take the newly founded titles of Ōi and Kisei, to become a quintuple champion (五冠王) - Yasuharu Ōyama (大山康晴). Ōyama went on to defend these titles for six years, a golden age which became known as the "Ōyama age". Ōyama reached a total of 80 title holding periods, an unprecedented achievement at the time, when there were fewer titles than at present.

After the number of titles increased to seven in 1983, it was believed to be impossible to hold all of them at once, but in 1996, Yoshiharu Habu became the first septuple champion (七冠王), beginning an age known as the "Habu age". Since then, there has never been a time when he was without a title, and on July 5, 2012, Habu surpassed Ōyama's record, achieving a total of 81 title holding periods.

=== The birth of the women's game ===
While there are both men and women among the ranks of professional shogi players, no woman player has yet won through the pro qualifier leagues (新進棋士奨励会 shinshin kishi shōreikai) to become an officially certified professional player (棋士 kishi). This served to slow the spread of the game among women, and to overcome the problem, the system of professional woman shogi players (女流棋士 joryū kishi) was introduced.

In 1966, Akiko Takojima (蛸島彰子) left the pro-qualifier leagues at the 1-dan level and became the first professional woman shogi player. However, at the time women's contests were not held, and so her only work as a professional was giving shogi lessons. In 1974, the first women's contest, the Women's Meijin Title Match (女流名人位戦 joryū meijin-sen), was held, which Takojima won, becoming the first woman meijin. 1974 is often considered to be the year in which women's shogi began, and indeed the Ladies Shogi Professional Organization (女流棋士会 joryū kishi kai) celebrates "anniversary parties" counting from this year.

As of 2014 there are more than 50 professional women players, and as well as the Universal Cup Women's Meijin Title Match (ユニバーサル杯女流名人戦), there is also the Mynabi Women's Open (マイナビ女子オープン), the Ricoh Cup Women's Ōza Title Match (リコー杯女流王座戦), the Women's Ōi Title Match (女流王位戦), the Kirishima Shuzo Cup Women's Ōshō Title Match (女流王将戦), the Ōyama Meijin Cup Kurashiki–Tōka Title Match (大山名人杯倉敷藤花戦), a total of six competitions. In addition, some standard professional tournaments has a women's section, in which the top women in each tournament compete.

=== Trends in the world of amateur shogi ===
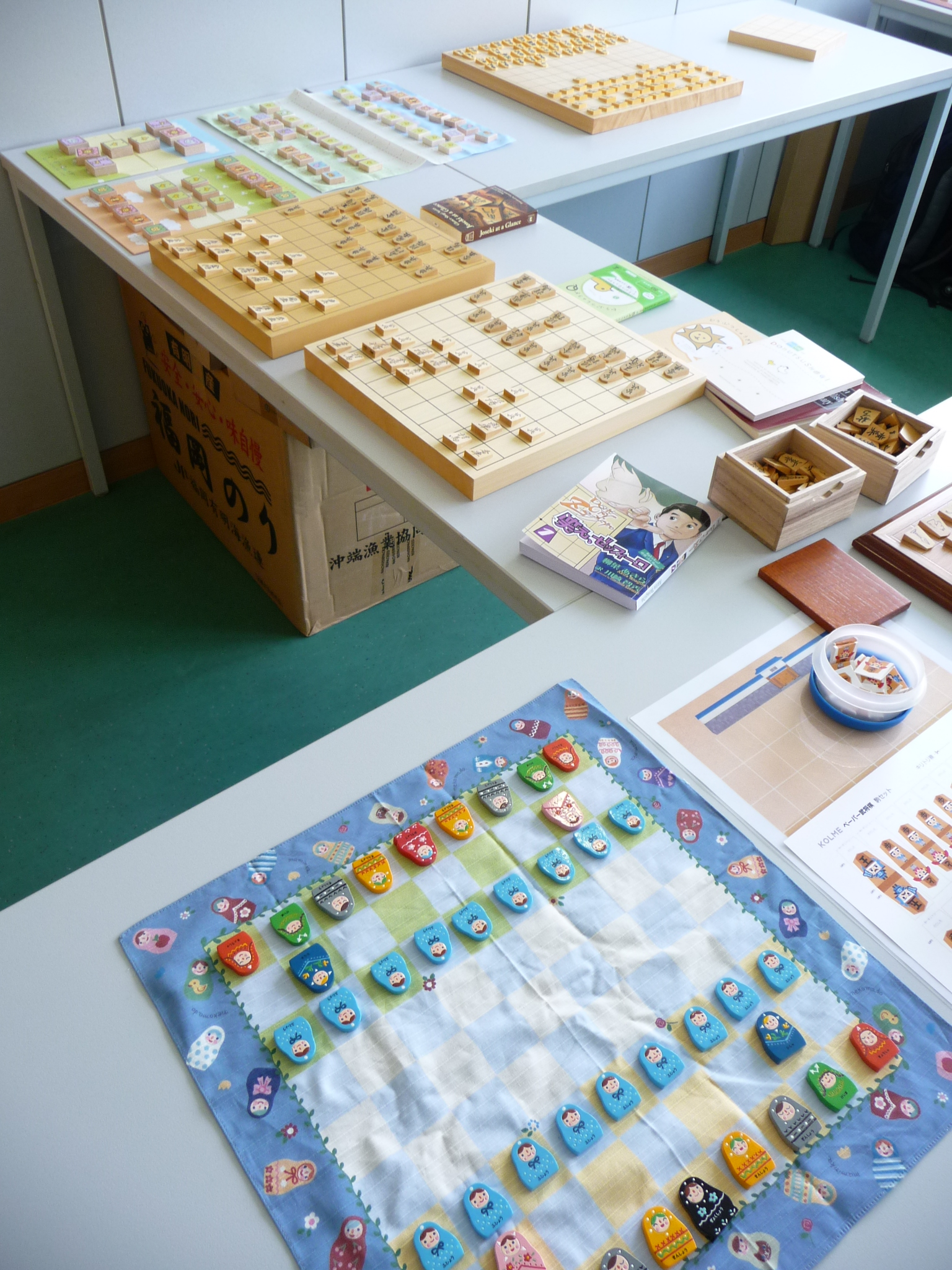
Various shogi sets on display, including children's shogi sets

Shogi is also well known among the general public (amateurs). Two different rating systems based dan and kyū ranks are used, one for amateurs and one for professionals, with the highest ranks at amateur level, 4-dan or 5-dan, being equivalent to 6-kyū at the professional level. In the past, there were games between amateurs and professionals, but these were generally special match-ups organised by newspapers or magazines, or instructional games at events or shogi courses.

However, sometimes there are amateurs with an ability to rival professionals, some of whom earn a living as shinken-shi (真剣師), gamblers playing for stakes. Motoji Hanamura (花村元司) made enough to live on as a shinken-shi, before taking the entrance exam and turning professional in 1944. He later challenged Yasuharu Ōyama in the Meijin-sen, but did not manage to take the title of meijin from him. Jūmei Koike (小池重明) was another shinken-shi, who beat one professional after another in special matches, and won the title of amateur meijin twice in a row, putting him ahead of the crowd in the amateur world. Later, due in part to the instigation of Ōyama, the then chairman of the general assembly of the Japanese Shogi Association (棋士総会), a vote was held on whether to accept Koike among their ranks, but there were concerns about his behaviour, and the vote went against him. Although he never became a professional, after his death, television programmes and books telling his story were produced, and he now has more fans all over Japan than when he was alive.

In recent times, the gap in ability between strong amateurs and professionals continues to diminish, and there are even official professional tournaments in which those with the best results in amateur shogi contests (将棋のアマチュア棋戦) can take part.

The number of players who have left the pro qualifier leagues and gone on to have success as amateurs has increased. Shōji Segawa (瀬川晶司) retired from the qualifier leagues due to age restrictions, but went on to compete as an amateur in professional matches. His performance in the Ginga tournament (銀河戦; Ginga-sen) was particularly notable, and at one point he won over 70% of his matches with professionals. Segawa submitted a petition requesting entry to the professional ranks to the Japan Shogi Association, and was granted exceptional permission to take the entrance exam. He is the first person to become a professional after retiring from the pro qualifier leagues.

In 2006, the Shogi Association officially admitted the entrance of amateurs and women professionals to the ranks of professionals (正棋士), and announced details of an entrance exam for the 4-dan level (entering the "free class" (フリークラス) level of the professional ranking league (順位戦)) and the third-level pro qualifier league (奨励会三段リーグ).

=== International spread ===
One of the early English-language introductions to the game was Trevor Leggett's Shogi: Japan's Game of Strategy (1966). In 1975, George F. Hodges founded The Shogi Association in Britain. The association's bimonthly magazine Shogi ran from January 1976 to November 1987, for a total of 70 issues. Japanese professional player Teruichi Aono later credited Hodges and John Fairbairn with playing an important role in establishing shogi in Europe. The Federation of European Shogi Associations was established in 1985 as organized shogi expanded across Europe.

== Computer shogi ==
Computers have steadily improved in playing shogi since the 1980s.
