= Dai shogi =

Japanese chess variant

Dai shogi (大将棋, large chess) or Kamakura dai shogi (鎌倉大将棋) is a board game native to Japan. It derived from Heian era shogi, and is similar to standard shogi (sometimes called Japanese chess) in its rules and game play. Dai shogi is only one of several large board shogi variants. Its name means large shogi, from a time when there were three sizes of shogi games. Early versions of dai shogi can be traced back to the Kamakura period, from about AD 1230. It was the historical basis for the later, much more popular variant chu shogi, which shrinks the board and removes the weakest pieces.

== History ==
Fujiwara no Yorinaga, tutor to the crown prince, recorded playing dai shogi, in his diary, the Taiki, written between 1135 and 1155 AD. The Nichūreki, an encyclopedia compiled in the 12th century by Miyoshi Tameyasu, described the rules for both dai shogi and Heian dai shogi, an ancestor of standard shogi played on a 13 × 13 board.

== Rules of the game ==
Other than the additional pieces (the iron and stone generals, knights, angry boars, cat swords, evil wolves, violent oxen, and flying dragons, which all promote to gold generals), the rules of dai shogi are thought to have corresponded very closely to those of its descendant chu shogi.

=== Objective ===
The objective of the game is to capture the opponent's king and, if present, the prince, which counts as a second king. Unlike standard shogi, pieces may not be dropped back into play after capture.

=== Game play ===
Two players alternate, making a move with Black moving first. (The pieces are not differentiated by color; the traditional chess terms "Black" and "White" are only used to indicate who plays first, and to differentiate the sides during discussions of the game.) A move consists of moving a piece either to an empty square on the board or to a square occupied by an opposing piece, thus capturing that piece; and optionally of promoting the moving piece, if the move enters the promotion zone, or if it is a capture and any part of it is in the promotion zone.

=== Game equipment ===
Two players, Black and White (or 先手 sente and 後手 gote), play on a board ruled into a grid of 15 ranks (rows) and 15 files (columns) with a total of 225 squares. The squares are undifferentiated by marking or color, unlike a Western chess board.

Each player has a set of 65 pieces of 29 different types. In all, a player must remember 36 different moves. Each piece has its name written on it in Japanese kanji. The writing is typically in black. On the reverse side of most pieces there are characters to indicate the piece's promoted rank, typically written in red. The pieces are wedge-shaped and their orientation indicates which player they belong to, as they point toward the opposing side. The pieces are of slightly different sizes, from largest to smallest (most to least powerful) they are:

- 1 King
- 1 Queen
- 1 Lion
- 2 Dragon kings
- 2 Dragon horses
- 2 Rooks
- 2 Bishops
- 1 Kirin
- 1 Phoenix
- 2 Violent oxen
- 2 Flying dragons
- 1 Drunk elephant
- 2 Blind tigers
- 2 Ferocious leopards
- 2 Gold generals
- 2 Silver generals
- 2 Copper generals
- 2 Angry boars
- 2 Cat swords
- 2 Vertical movers
- 2 Side movers
- 2 Reverse Chariots
- 2 Lances
- 2 Knights
- 2 Evil wolves
- 2 Iron generals
- 2 Stone generals
- 2 Go-betweens
- 15 Pawns

Listed below are the pieces of the game and, if they promote, the pieces they promote to. Names are rough translations that have become somewhat standardized in English. Pieces are listed alphabetically by their English name. (Sometimes the queen is called the "free king", a direct translation of its Japanese name. The kirin's name is sometimes anglicised as kylin.)

The promotions apply only to pieces which start out with the ranks in the left-most column, that is, pieces with these ranks written in black; promoted pieces with those same ranks written in red may not promote further. Pieces which only appear upon promotion, that is, names which only occur written in red, are marked with an asterisk. The king, queen, and lion do not promote.

Pieces
Piece name	Kanji	Romaji	Abbrev.	Promotion	Betza notation (of original piece)
angry boar	嗔猪	shinchō	嗔	gold general	W
bishop (diagonal mover)	角行	kakugyō	角	dragon horse	B
blind tiger	盲虎	mōko	虎	flying stag	FrlbW
cat sword	猫刄	myōjin	猫	gold general	F
copper general	銅将	dōshō	銅	side mover	fKbW
dragon horse	龍馬	ryūma^{1}	馬	horned falcon	BW
dragon king	龍王	ryūō	龍	soaring eagle	RF
drunk elephant	酔象	suizō	象	prince	FfrlW
evil wolf	悪狼	akurō	狼	gold general	frlK
ferocious leopard	猛豹	mōhyō	豹	bishop	FfbW
flying dragon	飛龍	hiryū	—	gold general	B2
*flying ox	飛牛	higyū	牛	(promoted vertical mover)	BfbR
*flying stag	飛鹿	hiroku	鹿	(promoted blind tiger)	fbRK
*free boar	奔猪	honcho	猪	(promoted side mover)	BrlR
gobetween	仲人	chūnin	仲	drunk elephant	fbW
gold general	金将	kinshō	金	rook	WfF
*horned falcon	角鷹	kakuō	鷹	(promoted dragon horse)	BrlbRf[avW]fD
iron general	鉄将	tesshō	鉄	gold general	fK
king (challenging)	玉将	gyokushō	玉	—	K
king (reigning)	王将	ōshō	王	—	K
kirin	麒麟	kirin	麒	lion	FD
knight	桂馬	keima	桂	gold general	ffN
lance	香車	kyōsha	香	white horse	fR
lion	獅子	shishi	獅	—	KNADcaKmcabK
pawn	歩兵	fuhyō	歩	gold general	fW
phoenix	鳳凰	hōō	鳳	queen	WA
*prince	太子	taishi	太	(promoted drunk elephant)	K
queen (fast king)	奔王	honnō^{1}	奔	—	Q
reverse chariot	反車	hensha^{1}	反	whale	fbR
rook (chariot)	飛車	hisha	飛	dragon king	R
side mover	横行	ōgyō	横	free boar	WrlR
silver general	銀将	ginshō	銀	vertical mover	FfW
stone general	石将	sekishō	石	gold general	fF
*soaring eagle	飛鷲	hijū	鷲	(promoted dragon king)	RbBf[avF]fA
vertical mover	竪行	shugyō	竪	flying ox	WfbR
violent ox	猛牛	mōgyū	猛	gold general	R2
*whale	鯨鯢	keigei	鯨	(promoted reverse chariot)	fRbQ
*white horse	白駒	hakku^{1}	駒	(promoted lance)	fQbR

^{1} The pronunciations of 龍馬, 奔王, 反車, and 白駒 are irregular. The regular forms ryūme, hon'ō, hansha, and hakuku are also seen.

=== Setup ===
Below is a diagram showing the initial setup of the board.

15	14	13	12	11	10	9	8	7	6	5	4	3	2	1
香 車	桂 馬	石 将	鉄 将	銅 将	銀 将	金 将	王 将	金 将	銀 将	銅 将	鉄 将	石 将	桂 馬	香 車	一
反 車		猫 刄		猛 豹		盲 虎	酔 象	盲 虎		猛 豹		猫 刄		反 車	二
	猛 牛		嗔 猪		悪 狼	鳳 凰	獅 子	麒 麟	悪 狼		嗔 猪		猛 牛		三
飛 車	飛 龍	横 行	竪 行	角 行	龍 馬	龍 王	奔 王	龍 王	龍 馬	角 行	竪 行	横 行	飛 龍	飛 車	四
歩 兵	歩 兵	歩 兵	歩 兵	歩 兵	歩 兵	歩 兵	歩 兵	歩 兵	歩 兵	歩 兵	歩 兵	歩 兵	歩 兵	歩 兵	五
				仲 人						仲 人					六
															七
															八
															九
				仲 人						仲 人					十
歩 兵	歩 兵	歩 兵	歩 兵	歩 兵	歩 兵	歩 兵	歩 兵	歩 兵	歩 兵	歩 兵	歩 兵	歩 兵	歩 兵	歩 兵	十 一
飛 車	飛 龍	横 行	竪 行	角 行	龍 馬	龍 王	奔 王	龍 王	龍 馬	角 行	竪 行	横 行	飛 龍	飛 車	十 二
	猛 牛		嗔 猪		悪 狼	麒 麟	獅 子	鳳 凰	悪 狼		嗔 猪		猛 牛		十 三
反 車		猫 刄		猛 豹		盲 虎	酔 象	盲 虎		猛 豹		猫 刄		反 車	十 四
香 車	桂 馬	石 将	鉄 将	銅 将	銀 将	金 将	玉 将	金 将	銀 将	銅 将	鉄 将	石 将	桂 馬	香 車	十 五

15	14	13	12	11	10	9	8	7	6	5	4	3	2	1
L	N	St	I	C	S	G	K	G	S	C	I	St	N	L	a
RC		CS		FL		BT	DE	BT		FL		CS		RC	b
	VO		AB		EW	Ph	Ln	Kr	EW		AB		VO		c
R	FD	SM	VM	B	DH	DK	Q	DK	DH	B	VM	SM	FD	R	d
P	P	P	P	P	P	P	P	P	P	P	P	P	P	P	e
				GB						GB					f
															g
															h
															i
				GB						GB					j
P	P	P	P	P	P	P	P	P	P	P	P	P	P	P	k
R	FD	SM	VM	B	DH	DK	Q	DK	DH	B	VM	SM	FD	R	l
	VO		AB		EW	Kr	Ln	Ph	EW		AB		VO		m
RC		CS		FL		BT	DE	BT		FL		CS		RC	n
L	N	St	I	C	S	G	K	G	S	C	I	St	N	L	o

Legend
AB: angry boar	Kr: kirin
B: bishop	L: lance
BT: blind tiger	Ln: lion
C: copper general	N: knight
CS: cat sword	P: pawn
DE: drunk elephant	Ph: phoenix
DH: dragon horse	Q: queen
DK: dragon king	R: rook
EW: evil wolf	RC: reverse chariot
FD: flying dragon	S: silver general
FL: ferocious leopard	SM: side mover
GB: gobetween	VM: vertical mover
G: gold general	St: stone general
I: iron general	VO: violent ox
K: king

The queen could also be abbreviated FK (for free king) and the kirin as Ky (for kylin).

=== Movement and capture ===
An opposing piece is captured by displacement: That is, if a piece moves to a square occupied by an opposing piece, the opposing piece is displaced and removed from the board. A piece cannot move to a square occupied by a friendly piece, that is, by another piece controlled by the moving player.

Each piece on the game moves in a characteristic pattern. Pieces move either orthogonally (that is, forward, backward, left, or right, in the direction of one of the arms of a plus sign, +), or diagonally (in the direction of one of the arms of a multiplication sign, ×). The lion and knight are exceptions in that they do not move, or are not required to move, in a straight line.

Many pieces are capable of several kinds of movement, with the type of movement most often depending on the direction in which they move. The movement categories are:

==== Step movers ====
Some pieces move only one square at a time. If a friendly piece occupies an adjacent square, the moving piece may not move in that direction; if an opposing piece is there, it may be displaced and captured.

The step movers are the king, drunk elephant, blind tiger, ferocious leopard, generals, angry boar, cat sword, evil wolf, go between and the 15 pawns on each side.

==== Limited ranging pieces ====
The violent ox and flying dragon can move along a limited number (2) of free (empty) squares along a straight line in certain directions. Other than the limited distance, they move like ranging pieces. See below.

==== Jumping pieces ====
Several pieces can jump, that is, they can pass over any intervening piece, whether friend or foe, with no effect on either. These are the lion, kirin, phoenix and knight.

==== Ranging pieces ====
Many pieces can move any number of empty squares along a straight orthogonal or diagonal line, limited only by the edge of the board. If an opposing piece intervenes, it may be captured by moving to that square and removing it from the board. A ranging piece must stop where it captures, and cannot bypass a piece that is in its way. If a friendly piece intervenes, the moving piece is limited to a distance that stops short of the intervening piece; if the friendly piece is adjacent, it cannot move in that direction at all.

The ranging pieces are the queen, dragon king, dragon horse, rook, bishop, vertical mover, side mover, reverse chariot and lance. Only the queen can range along all eight directions.

==== Lion moves (multiple captures) ====
The lion has sequential multiple-capture ability, called a 'lion move', as do the soaring eagle and horned falcon (promoted dragon king and dragon horse) to a lesser extent. The details of these powerful moves are described for the lion below.

=== Promotion ===
The promotion zone is the 'enemy camp', the farthest five ranks of the board, which are mostly occupied by the opposing player's pieces when the board is first set up. When a promotable piece makes a move entering the promotion zone, or makes a capture within the promotion zone—including moves entering, leaving, or moving entirely within the zone—it has the option of "promoting" to a more powerful rank. Promotion is effected by turning the piece over after it moves, revealing the name of its promoted rank. Promotion is not mandatory, and in some cases it may be beneficial to leave the piece unpromoted. Promotion is permanent and promoted pieces may not revert to their original rank.

If a piece is not promoted upon entering the promotion zone, then it may only promote if it makes a capture. This is reset by leaving the zone and reentering: promotion is possible on such a reentry even without a capture.

Promoting a piece has the effect of changing how that piece moves. See below.

If a piece that cannot retreat or move aside advances across the board until it reaches the other side, it is trapped. This applies to the pawn, stone general, iron general, knight, and lance. This would hardly occur in practice, because all of these but the knight promote to pieces that keep their old moves, and stalemate is a loss for the stalemated player. The situation of the knight is unclear, as it promotes to a piece that does not keep its old moves, and thus there could be a reason to defer its promotion. In chu shogi, which is descended from dai shogi, this situation applies to the pawn (because of the lion-trading rules in chu shogi), which therefore gets a second chance to promote at the last rank on a non-capture: this second chance can likewise be declined, leaving the pawn as an immobile "dead piece" (死に駒). Whether this rule applies to the knight in dai shogi is uncertain, both because this rule might be a later refinement to chu shogi, and because the Edo-era sources have numerous lacunae when describing the rules of the variants other than sho shogi and chu shogi.

The promotion rules of dai shogi may have changed significantly over time. The promotion rules in the earlier Heian shogi and Heian dai shogi provide for all weak stepping pieces to promote to the gold general, which is true for sho shogi and modern shogi. However, in chu shogi many of these pieces have changed promotions to ranging pieces in the initial setup. Dai shogi has a mixture of these rules: the weak steppers or limited rangers unique to dai shogi all promote to the gold general, but those present in chu shogi keep their promotion from the latter game.

The Chess Variant Pages suggest that these differing promotions in chu shogi are a later historical innovation, and that originally the weak pieces in chu shogi all promoted to gold (like in standard shogi). After removing the weakest pieces, the copper general, silver general, gold general, and ferocious leopard may have been considered to be still too insignificant, and were reassigned promotions to pieces in the initial setup that could not yet be obtained by promotion. This innovation would then have been copied back into dai shogi later, when chu shogi became more popular than dai shogi.

=== Individual pieces ===
Following are diagrams that indicate the movement of each piece. Pieces are listed roughly in order, from front to back rows, with pieces making similar moves paired. Pieces with a gray heading start out in the game; those with a blue heading only appear on the board as a promoted piece. Betza's funny notation has been included in brackets for easier reference, with the extension that the notation xxxayyyK stands for an xxxK move possibly followed by an yyyK move, not necessarily in the same direction. Larger numbers of 'legs' can be indicated by repeated application of 'a'. By default continuation legs can go into all directions, but can be restricted to a single line by a modifier 'v' ("vertical", interpreted relative to the piece's current position on its path). The default modality of all legs is the ability to move and capture: other possibilities are specified explicitly. Square brackets are used to make it clear what operators the a modifier chains together: thus DaK would denote a dabbaba move followed by a king move, but D[aK] would denote a piece that can move as a dabbaba, or twice as a king.

Notation
○	Steps to an adjacent square or has a limited range
☆	Jumps to a non-adjacent square, bypassing any intervening piece
│	Ranges along a straight line, crossing any number of empty squares
─	Ranges along a straight line, crossing any number of empty squares
╲	Ranges along a straight line, crossing any number of empty squares
╱	Ranges along a straight line, crossing any number of empty squares
!	igui (capture without moving)

King (reigning) • 王将 ōshō		King (challenging) • 玉将 gyokushō	
Step: The king moves one square in any direction. (K) The king general goes to the superior player.	○ / ○ / ○; ○ / 王 / ○; ○ / ○ / ○	Step: The king moves one square in any direction. (K) The jeweled general goes to the inferior player.	○ / ○ / ○; ○ / 玉 / ○; ○ / ○ / ○
Gold General • 金将 kinshō		Rook • 飛車 hisha	
Step: The gold general moves one square orthogonally or one square diagonally forward, giving it six possible moves. (WfF)	○ / ○ / ○; ○ / 金 / ○; / ○	Range: The rook moves any number of free squares orthogonally. (R)	/ / │; / / │; ─ / ─ / 飛 / ─ / ─; / / │; / / │
Silver General • 銀将 ginshō		Vertical Mover • 竪行 shugyō	
Step: The silver general moves one square diagonally or one square forward, giving it five possible moves. (FfW)	○ / ○ / ○; / 銀; ○ / / ○	Range: The vertical mover moves any number of free squares vertically. Step: It can step one square orthogonally sideways. (WfbR)	/ │; / │; ○ / 竪 / ○; / │; / │
Copper General • 銅将 dōshō		Side Mover • 横行 ōgyō	
Step: The copper general moves one square vertically or one square diagonally forward, giving it four possible moves. (fKbW)	○ / ○ / ○; / 銅; / ○	Range: The side mover moves any number of free squares horizontally. Step: It can move one square vertically. (WrlR)	/ / ○; ─ / ─ / 横 / ─ / ─; / / ○
Iron General • 鉄将 tesshō		Gold General • 金将 kinshō	
Step: The iron general can move one square forward or diagonally forward, giving it three possible moves. An iron general can only reach a fraction of the board. An iron general that reaches the farthest rank is trapped. (fK)	○ / ○ / ○; / 鉄	Step: The gold general moves one square orthogonally or one square diagonally forward, giving it six possible moves. (WfF)	○ / ○ / ○; ○ / 金 / ○; / ○
Stone General • 石将 sekishō		Gold General • 金将 kinshō	
Step: The stone general moves one square diagonally forward, giving it two possible moves. A stone general can only reach a fraction of the board. A stone general that reaches the farthest rank is trapped. (fF)	○ / / ○; / 石	Step: The gold general moves one square orthogonally or one square diagonally forward, giving it six possible moves. (WfF)	○ / ○ / ○; ○ / 金 / ○; / ○
Knight • 桂馬 keima		Gold General • 金将 kinshō	
Jump: The knight moves one square forward, then moves one square diagonally forward from there. It jumps over any pieces that are in its way. A knight that reaches the farthest rank is trapped. (ffN)	☆ / / ☆; / 桂	Step: The gold general moves one square orthogonally or one square diagonally forward, giving it six possible moves. (WfF)	○ / ○ / ○; ○ / 金 / ○; / ○
Lance • 香車 kyōsha		*White Horse • 白駒 hakku	
Range: The lance can move any number of free squares straight forward. A lance that reaches the farthest rank is trapped. (fR)	│; │; 香	Range: The white horse can move any number of free squares directly forward or backward; or, it can move any number of free squares diagonally forward. (fQbR)	╲ / / │ / / ╱; / ╲ / │ / ╱; / / 駒; / / │; / / │
Drunk Elephant • 酔象 suizō		*Prince • 太子 taishi	
Step: The drunk elephant can step one square in any direction, orthogonal or diagonal, except directly backward. (FfrlW)	○ / ○ / ○; ○ / 象 / ○; ○ / / ○	Step: The prince can step one square in any direction, orthogonal or diagonal. (K) If your opponent has a prince in play, both it and the king must be captured to win.	○ / ○ / ○; ○ / 太 / ○; ○ / ○ / ○
Blind Tiger • 盲虎 mōko		*Flying Stag • 飛鹿 hiroku	
Step: The blind tiger can step one square in any direction except orthogonally forward. (FrlbW)	○ / / ○; ○ / 虎 / ○; ○ / ○ / ○	Range: The flying stag can move any number of free squares directly forward or backward. Step: It can move one square sideways or along one of the four diagonals. (fbRK)	/ │; ○ / │ / ○; ○ / 鹿 / ○; ○ / │ / ○; / │
Ferocious Leopard • 猛豹 mōhyō		Bishop • 角行 kakugyō	
Step: The ferocious leopard can step to any of the six squares ahead or behind it, but not directly to the side. (FfbW)	○ / ○ / ○; / 豹; ○ / ○ / ○	Range: The bishop can move any number of free squares along any of the four diagonal directions. Because it cannot move orthogonally, an unpromoted bishop can only reach half the squares on the board. (B)	╲ / / / / ╱; / ╲ / / ╱; / / 角; / ╱ / / ╲; ╱ / / / / ╲
Cat Sword • 猫刄 myōjin		Gold General • 金将 kinshō	
Step: The cat sword can move one square in one of the four diagonal directions. (F) Because it cannot move orthogonally, an unpromoted cat sword can only reach half the squares on the board.	○ / / ○; / 猫; ○ / / ○	Step: The gold general moves one square orthogonally or one square diagonally forward, giving it six possible moves. (WfF)	○ / ○ / ○; ○ / 金 / ○; / ○
Reverse Chariot • 反車 hensha		*Whale • 鯨鯢 keigei	
Range: The reverse chariot can move any number of free squares directly forward or backward. (fbR)	│; │; 反; │; │	Range: The whale can move any number of free squares directly forward or backward; or; it can move any number of free squares diagonally backward. (fRbQ)	/ / │; / / │; / / 鯨; / ╱ / │ / ╲; ╱ / / │ / / ╲
Lion • 獅子 shishi
Area move/double capture: The lion can step one square in any direction up to twice in a turn. It can change directions after its first step, and is not restricted to following one of the eight orthogonal or diagonal directions. That is, it can also step to one of the in-between squares that a knight jumps to in Western chess. It can continue after a capture on the first step, potentially capturing two pieces on each turn. By moving back to its starting square, it can effectively capture a piece on an adjacent square without moving. This is called 居喰い igui "stationary feeding". A similar move without capturing leaves the board unchanged, which is a way to pass a turn. Jump: The lion can jump anywhere within two squares. This is equivalent to jumping in any of the eight diagonal or orthogonal directions, or making any of the jumps of a knight in Western chess. The capture rules in chu shogi do not apply in dai shogi. The lion does not promote. (KNADcaKmcabK)			☆ / ☆ / ☆ / ☆ / ☆; ☆ / ! / ! / ! / ☆; ☆ / ! / 獅 / ! / ☆; ☆ / ! / ! / ! / ☆; ☆ / ☆ / ☆ / ☆ / ☆; ○ / ○ / ○ / ○ / ○; ○ / ○ / ○ / ○ / ○; ○ / ○ / 獅 / ○ / ○; ○ / ○ / ○ / ○ / ○; ○ / ○ / ○ / ○ / ○
Phoenix • 鳳凰 hōō		Queen • 奔王 honnō	
Step: The phoenix can step one square in one of the four orthogonal directions. Jump: It can jump to the second square in one of the four diagonal directions. (WA)	☆ / / / / ☆; / / ○; / ○ / 鳳 / ○; / / ○; ☆ / / / / ☆	Range: The queen can move any number of free squares along any one of the eight orthogonal or diagonal directions. (Q)	╲ / / │ / / ╱; / ╲ / │ / ╱; ─ / ─ / 奔 / ─ / ─; / ╱ / │ / ╲; ╱ / / │ / / ╲
Kirin • 麒麟 kirin		Lion • 獅子 shishi	
Step: The kirin can step one square in one of the four diagonal directions. Jump: It can jump to the second square in one of the four orthogonal directions. Because of its unusual movement, an unpromoted kirin can only reach half the squares on the board. (FD)	/ / ☆; / ○ / / ○; ☆ / / 麒 / / ☆; / ○ / / ○; / / ☆	See Lion above for text description. (KNADcaKmcabK)	☆ / ☆ / ☆ / ☆ / ☆; ☆ / ! / ! / ! / ☆; ☆ / ! / 獅 / ! / ☆; ☆ / ! / ! / ! / ☆; ☆ / ☆ / ☆ / ☆ / ☆
Evil Wolf • 悪狼 akurō		Gold General • 金将 kinshō	
Step: The evil wolf can step one square orthogonally sideways or forward, or diagonally forward. (frlK)	○ / ○ / ○; ○ / 狼 / ○	Step: The gold general moves one square orthogonally or one square diagonally forward, giving it six possible moves. (WfF)	○ / ○ / ○; ○ / 金 / ○; / ○
Angry Boar • 嗔猪 shincho		Gold General • 金将 kinshō	
Step: The angry boar can step one square in one of the four orthogonal directions. (W)	/ ○; ○ / 嗔 / ○; / ○	Step: The gold general moves one square orthogonally or one square diagonally forward, giving it six possible moves. (WfF)	○ / ○ / ○; ○ / 金 / ○; / ○
Violent Ox • 猛牛 mōgyū		Gold General • 金将 kinshō	
Limited range: The violent ox can move one or two squares along one of the four orthogonal directions. (R2)	/ / ○; / / ○; ○ / ○ / 牛 / ○ / ○; / / ○; / / ○	Step: The gold general moves one square orthogonally or one square diagonally forward, giving it six possible moves. (WfF)	○ / ○ / ○; ○ / 金 / ○; / ○
Queen • 奔王 honnō			
Range: The queen can move any number of free squares along any one of the eight orthogonal or diagonal directions. (Q)	╲ / / │ / / ╱; / ╲ / │ / ╱; ─ / ─ / 奔 / ─ / ─; / ╱ / │ / ╲; ╱ / / │ / / ╲	The queen does not promote.	
Dragon King • 龍王 ryūō		*Soaring Eagle • 飛鷲 hijū	
Range: The dragon king can move any number of free squares along any of the four orthogonal directions. Step: It can move one square in any diagonal direction. (FR)	/ / │; / ○ / │ / ○; ─ / ─ / 龍 / ─ / ─; / ○ / │ / ○; / / │	Range: The soaring eagle can move any number of free squares in a straight line in any direction except the forward diagonals. Lion move: It can move or jump one or two squares along either forward diagonal, potentially capturing two pieces. This power includes igui and skipping a turn (see "Lion"), but not moving off the diagonal. (RbBf[avF]fA)	☆ / / │ / / ☆; / ! / │ / !; ─ / ─ / 鷲 / ─ / ─; / ╱ / │ / ╲; ╱ / / │ / / ╲
Dragon Horse • 龍馬 ryūma		*Horned Falcon • 角鷹 kakuō	
Range: The dragon horse can move any number of free squares along any of the four diagonal directions. Step: It can move one square in any orthogonal direction. (WB)	╲ / / / / ╱; / ╲ / ○ / ╱; / ○ / 馬 / ○; / ╱ / ○ / ╲; ╱ / / / / ╲	Range: The horned falcon can move any number of free squares in a straight line in any direction except directly forwards. Lion move: It can move or jump one or two squares along a line directly forward, potentially capturing two pieces. This power includes igui and skipping a turn (see "Lion"), but not moving off the orthogonal. (BrlbRf[avW]fD)	╲ / / ☆ / / ╱; / ╲ / ! / ╱; ─ / ─ / 鷹 / ─ / ─; / ╱ / │ / ╲; ╱ / / │ / / ╲
Bishop • 角行 kakugyō		Dragon Horse • 龍馬 ryūme	
Range: The bishop can move any number of free squares along any of the four diagonal directions. Because it cannot move orthogonally, an unpromoted bishop can only reach half the squares on the board. (B)	╲ / / / / ╱; / ╲ / / ╱; / / 角; / ╱ / / ╲; ╱ / / / / ╲	Range: The dragon horse can move any number of free squares along any of the four diagonal directions. Step: It can move one square in any orthogonal direction. (WB)	╲ / / / / ╱; / ╲ / ○ / ╱; / ○ / 馬 / ○; / ╱ / ○ / ╲; ╱ / / / / ╲
Vertical Mover • 竪行 shugyō		*Flying Ox • 飛牛 higyū	
Range: The vertical mover can move any number of free squares orthogonally forward or backward. Step: It can step one square orthogonally sideways. (fbRW)	/ │; / │; ○ / 竪 / ○; / │; / │	Range: The flying ox can move any number of free squares along one of the four diagonal directions; or, it can move any number of free squares orthogonally forward or backward. (fbRB)	╲ / / │ / / ╱; / ╲ / │ / ╱; / / 牛; / ╱ / │ / ╲; ╱ / / │ / / ╲
Side Mover • 横行 ōgyō		*Free Boar • 奔猪 honcho	
Range: The side mover can move any number of free squares orthogonally sideways. Step: It can move one square orthogonally forward or backward. (WrlR)	/ / ○; ─ / ─ / 横 / ─ / ─; / / ○	Range: The free boar can move any number of free squares along one of the four diagonal directions, or along either orthogonal sideways. (BrlR)	╲ / / / / ╱; / ╲ / / ╱; ─ / ─ / 猪 / ─ / ─; / ╱ / / ╲; ╱ / / / / ╲
Flying Dragon • 飛龍 hiryū		Gold General • 金将 kinshō	
Limited range: The flying dragon can move one or two squares along one of the four diagonal directions. (B2)	○ / / / / ○; / ○ / / ○; / / 隨; / ○ / / ○; ○ / / / / ○	Step: The gold general moves one square orthogonally or one square diagonally forward, giving it six possible moves. (WfF)	○ / ○ / ○; ○ / 金 / ○; / ○
Rook • 飛車 hisha		Dragon King • 龍王 ryūō	
Range: The rook can move any number of free squares along any of the four orthogonal directions. (R)	/ / │; / / │; ─ / ─ / 飛 / ─ / ─; / / │; / / │	Range: The dragon king can move any number of free squares along any of the four orthogonal directions. Step: It can move one square in any diagonal direction. (FR)	/ / │; / ○ / │ / ○; ─ / ─ / 龍 / ─ / ─; / ○ / │ / ○; / / │
Pawn • 歩兵 fuhyō		Gold General • 金将 kinshō	
Step: The pawn can only step one square directly forward. A pawn that reaches the farthest rank is trapped. (fW)	○; 歩	Step: The gold general moves one square orthogonally or one square diagonally forward, giving it six possible moves. (WfF)	○ / ○ / ○; ○ / 金 / ○; / ○
Go-Between • 仲人 chūnin		Drunk Elephant • 酔象 suizō	
Step: The go-between can move one square orthogonally forward or backward. (fbW)	○; 仲; ○	Step: The drunk elephant can step one square in any direction, orthogonal or diagonal, except directly backward. (FfrlW)	○ / ○ / ○; ○ / 象 / ○; ○ / / ○

=== Repetition ===
A player may not make a move if the resulting position is one that has previously occurred in the game with the same player to move. This is called repetition (千日手 sennichite). Note that certain pieces have the ability to pass in certain situations – a lion, when at least one square immediately adjacent to it is unoccupied; a horned falcon, when the square immediately in front of it is unoccupied; and a soaring eagle, when one or both of the two squares immediately diagonally in front of it are unoccupied. (The horned falcon and soaring eagle also cannot skip a turn if they are on the last rank, and those squares would fall off the edge of the board; at least, that is the modern rule in chu shogi, and dai shogi should be similar.) Such a pass move leaves the position unchanged, but it does not violate the repetition rule, as it will now be the turn of the other player to move. Of course, two consecutive passes are not possible, as the first player will see the same position as before.

However, evidence from chu shogi problems suggests that this at least does not apply to a player who is in check or whose pieces are attacked, as otherwise one could win via perpetual check or perpetual pursuit. The modern chu shogi rule as applied by the Japanese Chu Shogi Association (JCSA) is as follows, and presumably dai shogi should be similar. If one side is making attacks on other pieces (however futile) with his moves in the repeat cycle, and the other is not, the attacking side must deviate, while in case of checking the checker must deviate regardless of whether the checked side attacks other pieces. In the case of consecutive passes, the side passing first must deviate, making turn passing to avoid zugzwang pointless if the opponent is in a position where he can pass his turn too. Only the fourth repetition is forbidden by these rules. If none of these are applicable, repetition is a draw.

=== Check and mate ===
When a player makes a move such that the opponent's only remaining royal (king or prince) could be captured on the following move, the move is said to give check; the king or prince is said to be in check. If a player's king or prince is in check and no legal move by that player will get it out of check, the checking move is also mate, and effectively wins the game.

Unlike Western chess, a player need not move out of check in dai shogi, and indeed may even move into check. Although obviously not often a good idea, a player with more than one royal may occasionally sacrifice one of these pieces as part of a gambit.

=== Game end ===
A player who captures the opponent's sole remaining king or prince wins the game. Thus a player who is checkmated or stalemated will lose. The very artificial situation of a smothered stalemate, where no moves are possible (even those that would expose the king), is not covered in the historical sources. The Chess Variant Pages rule this as a loss for the stalemated player, for definiteness.

In practice this rarely happens, as a player will resign when checkmated, as otherwise when loss is inevitable.

A player who makes an illegal move loses immediately. (This rule may be relaxed in casual games.)

== Game notation ==
The method used in English-language texts to express shogi moves was established by George Hodges in 1976. It is derived from the algebraic notation used for chess, but modifications have been made for dai shogi.

A typical example is P-8f. The first letter represents the piece moved (see setup above). Promoted pieces have a + added in front of the letter. e.g., +P for a gold general (promoted pawn). The designation of the piece is followed by a symbol indicating the type of move: - for an ordinary move or x for a capture. Next is the designation for the square on which the piece lands. This consists of a number representing the file and a lowercase letter representing the rank, with 1a being the top right corner (as seen from Black's point of view) and 15o being the bottom left corner. (This method of designating squares is based on Japanese convention, which, however, uses Japanese numerals instead of letters. For example, the square 2c is denoted by 2三 in Japanese.)

If a move entitles the player to promote the piece, then a + is added to the end to signify that the promotion was taken, or an = to indicate that it was declined. For example, Nx7d= indicates a knight capturing on 7d without promoting.

In cases where the above notation would be ambiguous, the designation of the start square is added after the designation for the piece in order to make clear which piece is meant.

When a 'Lion', 'Horned Falcon' or 'Soaring Eagle' captures by 'igui' (that is, without moving), the square of the piece being captured is used instead of the destination square, and this is preceded by the symbol '!'. For example, a Lion on 8c capturing a piece on 9d would be shown as Lnx!9d.

When a piece makes a double capture with 'Lion' powers, both captures are shown in the order that they were made. For example, a Lion on 3g, capturing a piece on 3h and then capturing another on 2i, would be represented by Lnx3hx2i.

Moves are commonly numbered as in chess.

== See also ==
- Chu shogi
- Dai dai shogi
- Heian dai shogi
- History of shogi
- Maka dai dai shogi
- Shogi variant
- Tai shogi
- Taikyoku shogi
- Tenjiku shogi
- Wa shogi
