= Maka dai dai shogi =

Large variant of shogi

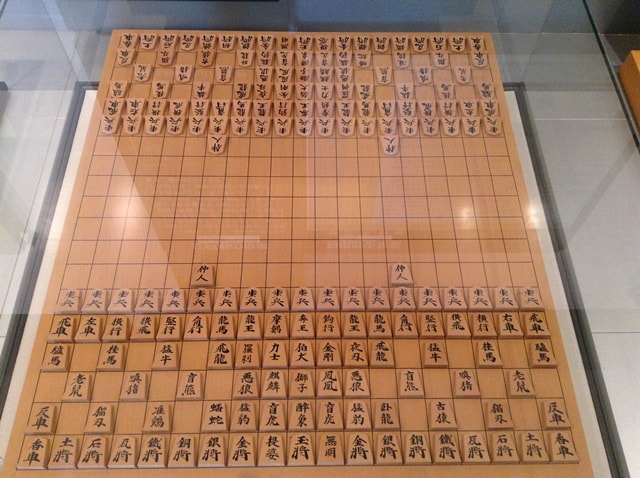
Maka dai dai shogi display showing the initial setup, at the Tendō shogi museum (天童市将棋資料館)

Maka dai dai shōgi (摩訶大大将棋 or 摩𩹄大大象戯 'ultra-huge chess') is a large board variant of shogi (Japanese chess). The game dates back to the 15th century and is based on dai dai shogi and the earlier dai shogi. The three Edo-era sources are not congruent in their descriptions of the pieces not found in smaller games. Apart from its size and number of pieces, the major difference from these smaller games is the "promotion by capture" rule. A more compact modern proposal for the game is called hishigata shogi.

Because of the terse and often incomplete wording of the historical sources for the large shogi variants, except for chu shogi and to a lesser extent dai shogi (which were at some points of time the most prestigious forms of shogi being played), the historical rules of maka dai dai shogi are not clear. Different sources often significantly differ in the moves attributed to the pieces, and the degree of contradiction (summarized below with the listing of most known alternative moves) is so great that it is likely impossible to reconstruct the 'true historical rules' with any degree of certainty, if there ever was such a thing. It is unclear whether the game was ever played much historically, as the few sets that were made seem to have been intended only for display.

== Rules of the game ==
=== Objective ===
The objective is to capture the opponent's king or emperor. If a prince is in play, it too must be captured. Unlike standard shogi, pieces may not be dropped back into play after being captured.

=== Game equipment ===
Two players, Black and White (or sente and gote), play on a board composed of squares in a grid of 19 ranks (rows) by 19 files (columns) with a total of 361 squares. The squares are undifferentiated by marking or color.

Each player has a set of 96 wedge-shaped pieces of 50 different types. In all, the players must remember 74 different moves. The pieces are of slightly different sizes, from largest to smallest (or roughly most to least powerful) they are:

- 1 King
- 1 Hook mover
- 1 Capricorn
- 1 Queen
- 2 Dragon kings
- 2 Dragon horses
- 2 Rooks
- 2 Bishops
- 2 Side fliers
- 1 Lion
- 1 Lion dog
- 1 She-devil
- 1 Wrestler
- 1 Guardian of the Gods
- 1 Buddhist devil
- 2 Violent oxen
- 2 Flying dragons
- 2 Old rats
- 1 Right chariot
- 1 Left chariot
- 2 Vertical movers
- 2 Side movers
- 1 Phoenix
- 1 Kirin
- 2 Donkeys
- 2 Knights
- 1 Drunken elephant
- 2 Blind tigers
- 2 Ferocious leopards
- 1 Reclining dragon
- 2 Gold generals
- 2 Silver generals
- 2 Copper generals
- 2 Tile generals
- 2 Evil Wolves
- 2 Iron generals
- 2 Stone generals
- 2 Reverse chariots
- 2 Lances
- 2 Earth generals
- 2 Go betweens
- 2 Blind bears
- 1 Chinese cock
- 1 Old monkey
- 2 Angry boars
- 2 Cat swords
- 1 Coiled serpent
- 1 Dark spirit
- 1 Deva
- 19 Pawns

Many of the English-language names are chosen to correspond to their rough equivalents in Western chess, not necessarily as translations of the Japanese names. (Sometimes the queen is called the "free king", a direct translation of its Japanese name. The kirin's name is sometimes anglicised as kylin.)

Each piece has its name in the form of two Japanese characters marked on its face. On the reverse side of some pieces are one or two other characters, often in a different color (e.g., red instead of black); this reverse side is used to indicate that the piece has been promoted during play. The pieces of the two sides do not differ in color, but instead each piece is shaped like a wedge, and faces forward, toward the opposing side. This shows who controls the piece during play.

==== Table of pieces ====
Listed below are the pieces of the game and, if they promote, which pieces they promote to. Of the 50 kinds of pieces, 21 promote to gold, 26 promote to new pieces (though some move like starting pieces, e.g. the free cat moves like a bishop, the free earth & goer like a reverse chariot); and 3 do not promote (queen, dragon king, and dragon horse). The new pieces are marked with an asterisk (*).

Maka dai dai pieces (arranged by setup position)
Piece	Kanji	Rōmaji	Promotes to		
King	玉将/王将	gyokushō/ōshō	*Emperor	自在天王	jizai tennō
Deva	提婆	daiba	*Teaching king	教王	kyōō
Dark spirit	無明	mumyō	*Buddhist spirit	法性	hōsei
Gold general	金将	kinshō	*Free gold	奔金	honkin
Silver general	銀将	ginshō	*Free silver	奔銀	hongin
Copper general	銅将	dōshō	*Free copper	奔銅	hondō
Iron general	鉄将	tesshō	*Free iron	奔鉄	hontetsu
Tile general	瓦将	gashō	*Free tile	奔瓦	honga
Stone general	石将	sekishō	*Free stone	奔石	honseki
Earth general	土将	doshō	*Free earth	奔土	hondo
Lance	香車	kyōsha	Gold		
Drunken elephant	酔象	suizō	*Prince	王子	ōji
Blind tiger	盲虎	mōko	*Free tiger	奔虎	honko
Ferocious leopard	猛豹	mōhyō	*Free leopard	奔豹	honpyō
Coiled serpent	蟠蛇	banja	*Free serpent	奔蛇	honja
Reclining dragon	臥龍	garyū	*Free dragon	奔龍	honryū
Chinese cock	淮鶏	waikei	*Wizard stork	仙鶴 †	senkaku
Old monkey	古猿	koen	*Mountain witch	山母	sambo
Cat sword	猫刄	myōjin	*Free cat	奔猫	honmyō
Reverse chariot	反車	hensha	Gold		
Lion	獅子	shishi	*Furious fiend (Note: According to the Japanese Chu Shogi Association, the lion does not promote in maka dai dai shogi.)	奮迅	funshin
Kirin	麒麟	kirin	*Great dragon (Note: The Japanese Chu Shogi Association has the kirin and phoenix promoting to lion and queen respectively, as in chu shogi.)	大龍	dairyū
Phoenix	鳳凰	hōō	*Golden bird	金翅	kinshi
Evil wolf	悪狼	akurō	*Free wolf	奔狼	honrō
Blind bear	盲熊	mōyū	*Free bear	奔熊	hon'yū
Angry boar	嗔猪	shincho	*Free boar	奔猪	honcho
Old rat	老鼠	rōso	*Bat	蝙蝠	kōmori
Lion dog	狛犬	komainu	Gold		
Wrestler	力士	rikishi	Gold		
Guardian of the Gods	金剛	kongō	Gold		
Buddhist devil	羅刹	rasetsu	Gold		
She-devil	夜叉	yasha	Gold		
Flying dragon	飛龍	hiryū	Gold		
Violent ox	猛牛	mōgyū	Gold		
Knight	桂馬	keima	Gold		
Donkey	驢馬	roba	Gold		
Queen	奔王	hōnnō	—		
Capricorn	摩羯	makatsu	Gold		
Hook mover	鉤行	kōgyō	Gold		
Dragon king	龍王	ryūō	—		
Dragon horse	龍馬	ryūme	—		
Bishop	角行	kakugyō	Gold		
Vertical mover	竪行	shugyō	Gold		
Side flier	横飛	ōhi	Gold		
Side mover	横行	ōgyō	Gold		
Left chariot	左車	sasha	Gold		
Right chariot	右車	usha	Gold		
Rook	飛車	hisha	Gold		
Pawn	歩兵	fuhyō	Gold		
Go between	仲人	chūnin	*Free goer	奔人	honnin

† The second character in 'wizard stork' is not present in most fonts: it should be 而 atop 鷦.

The queen could also be abbreviated FK (for free king) and the kirin as Ky (for kylin).

=== Setup ===
Below is a diagram showing the setup of one player's pieces. The way one player sees their own pieces is the same way the opposing player will see their pieces.

Board layout
					仲								仲					
歩	歩	歩	歩	歩	歩	歩	歩	歩	歩	歩	歩	歩	歩	歩	歩	歩	歩	歩
飛	左	横	横飛	竪	角	馬	龍	摩	奔	鉤	龍	馬	角	竪	横飛	横	右	飛
驢		桂		牛		飛龍	羅	力	狛	剛	叉	飛龍		牛		桂		驢
	鼠		猪		熊		狼	麒	獅	鳳	狼		熊		猪		鼠	
反		猫		鶏		蛇	豹	虎	象	虎	豹	臥		猿		猫		反
香	土	石	瓦	鉄	銅	銀	金	提	玉/王	無	金	銀	銅	鉄	瓦	石	土	香

Board layout
					GB								GB					
p	p	p	p	p	p	p	p	p	p	p	p	p	p	p	p	p	p	p
R	LC	SM	SF	VM	B	DH	DK	Ca	Q	HM	DK	DH	B	VM	SF	SM	RC	R
Dn		N		VO		FD	BD	W	LD	GG	SD	FD		VO		N		Dn
	OR		AB		BB		EW	Kr	Ln	Ph	EW		BB		AB		OR	
RV		CS		CC		Co	FL	BT	DE	BT	FL	RD		OM		CS		RV
L	E	St	T	I	C	S	G	Dv	K	DS	G	S	C	I	T	St	E	L

Legend
AB: Angry Boar	B: Bishop	BB: Blind Bear
BD: Buddhist Devil	BT: Blind Tiger	C: Copper General
Ca: Capricorn	CC: Chinese Cock	Co: Coiled Serpent
CS: Cat Sword	Dv: Deva	DE: Drunk Elephant
DH: Dragon Horse	DK: Dragon King	Dn: Donkey
DS: Dark Spirit	E: Earth General	EW: Evil Wolf
FD: Flying Dragon	FL: Ferocious Leopard	G: Gold General
GB: Go-between	GG: Guardian of the Gods	HM: Hook Mover
I: Iron General	K: King	Kr: Kirin
L: Lance	LC: Left Chariot	LD: Lion Dog
Ln: Lion	N: Knight	OM: Old Monkey
OR: Old Rat	p: Pawn	Ph: Phoenix
Q: Queen	R: Rook	RC: Right Chariot
RD: Reclining Dragon	RV: Reverse Chariot	S: Silver General
SD: She-devil	SF: Side Flier	St: Stone General
SM: Side Mover	T: Tile General	VM: Vertical Mover
VO: Violent Ox	W: Wrestler	

The Shōgi rokushu no zushiki gives the following mnemonic poem to aid in the memorization of the initial setup:

立馬略頌
玉醉獅犬奔王歩 提虎騏力摩羯歩
金豹悪羅龍王歩 銀蛇飛龍龍馬歩
銅将盲熊角歩仲 鐵鶏猛牛竪行歩
瓦将嗔猪横飛歩 石猫桂馬横行歩
土将老鼠左車歩 香反驢馬飛車歩
歩兵左右不_{レ}替者 走馬與_{レ}利立_{レ}于_{レ}端
釣行龍々角竪行 横飛横行右飛車
金夜飛龍牛桂驢 鳳悪盲熊嗔老鼠
虎豹臥龍猿猫反 無明金銀銅鐵将
瓦将石将土将香 両方相違對揚馬
提婆無明與_{レ}王副 麒麟鳳皇獅子脇
金剛力士犬左右 釣行摩羯龍王内
羅刹夜叉龍王下 臥龍蟠蛇銀将上
古猿淮鶏鐵将上 左右両車飛車内

=== Game play ===
The players alternate making a move, with Black moving first. (The traditional terms 'black' and 'white' are used to differentiate the sides during discussion of the game, though the pieces are all the same color.) A move consists of moving a piece on the board and potentially promoting the piece. Each of these options is detailed below.

=== Movement and capture ===
Most pieces in the game move in a unique manner.

==== Step movers ====
The kings, drunken elephants, blind tigers, ferocious leopards, reclining dragons, Chinese cocks, old monkeys, evil wolves, generals, angry boars, cat swords, coiled serpents, dark spirits, Devas, go betweens and pawns only move one square at a time. If an opponent's piece occupies a square that is a possible destination for the moving piece, the opponent's piece may be captured by placing the moving piece on that square, and removing the opponent's piece from the board. If a friendly piece (that is, a piece controlled by the same player) occupies the square, the moving piece may not move in that direction.

==== Limited ranging pieces ====
The she-devil, wrestler, guardian of the Gods, Buddhist devil, violent ox, flying dragon and old rat can move along a limited number of free squares in certain directions.

==== Jumping pieces ====
The emperor, lion, lion dog, furious fiend, teaching king, Buddhist spirit, kirin, phoenix, donkey and knight jump, that is, they can move over any intervening piece, whether friend or foe.

==== Ranging pieces ====
The queen, dragon king, dragon horse, chariots, rook, bishop, side flier, movers and lance can move any number of squares along a straight line, limited by the edge of the board. If an opponent's piece intervenes, it may be captured by moving to that square, and removing it from the board. If a friendly piece intervenes, the moving piece is limited to a distance that stops short of the intervening piece; if the friendly piece is adjacent, it cannot move in that direction at all.

==== Hook moves (changing tack) ====
The hook mover and Capricorn can move any number of squares along a straight line, then any number of squares along a perpendicular straight line limited by the edge of the board. If an opponent's piece intervenes, it may be captured by moving to that square, and removing it from the board. If a friendly piece intervenes, the moving piece is limited to a distance that stops short of the intervening piece; if the friendly piece is adjacent, it cannot move in that direction at all. Although they have the ability to move in two directions in one move, they are not required to.

==== Lion moves (multiple captures) ====
The lion, lion dog, furious fiend, teaching king, and Buddhist spirit have sequential multiple-capture abilities, called "lion moves". The details of these powerful moves are described for the lion and lion dog, below.

==== Promotion ====
According to The Chess Variant Pages, pieces that can promote can choose whether or not they will promote when they capture an unpromoted enemy piece; however, if a piece captures a promoted piece, it must promote if able. Promotion is indicated by turning the piece over after it moves, revealing the character for the promoted piece. There are no promotion zones; dots on the board that usually represent promotion zones are present after the sixth rank only as a placement guide for initial setup.

TSA and Japanese Wikipedia suggest instead that promotion is compulsory on any capture, but this seems unlikely; many of the most powerful pieces cannot be obtained through promotion, but many very powerful pieces "promote" to a far weaker gold general, so compulsory promotion on any capture would quickly degenerate the armies into seas of golds.

Most pieces which are already promoted cannot promote again. However, any piece, promoted or not, that captures a Deva or teaching king (a promoted Deva) promotes to a teaching king. This is effected by replacing it on the board with the captured piece. Similarly, any piece that captures a dark spirit or Buddhist spirit (a promoted dark spirit) promotes to a Buddhist spirit. This is sometimes expressed as the piece being contagious: when something captures a contagious piece type, it becomes that piece type. The only exception is (potentially) royal pieces (emperors, kings, princes, and drunk elephants) which promote to their normal promoted forms, or stay as they are if already promoted.

It is not clear what happens if a multi-capturing piece such as a lion or a lion dog captures two different contagious piece types in one turn, e.g. a lion capturing both a teaching king and a Buddhist spirit on the same turn. Although the situation is very unlikely to arise, an official of the Japanese Chu Shogi Association has suggested in discussion with H. G. Muller (who programmed an engine HaChu for chu shogi and wrote the descriptions for some large shogi variants for The Chess Variant Pages) that the multi-capturing piece would promote to the last piece captured. In the case of a lion dog capturing two pieces on the same orthogonal or diagonal, the official claimed that it would not be permitted to jump over the first piece, capture the second, and then move back to capture the first, though Muller admits that the logic did not "make much sense" to him and that he would be happy with the option to choose. (Note that this situation is extremely theoretical anyway, because allowing both these powerful pieces to be captured at once would imply very poor play.)

Otherwise, pieces don't promote more than once: they only have two sides.

Pieces on the 4th, 5th, and 6th ranks which promote, as well as the outside pieces of the 1st and 2nd ranks, promote (or perhaps demote) to Gold. Twelve of the pieces in the first and second ranks, as well as the go-between, become "free" when promoted, meaning that they move in the same directions as in their unpromoted state, but are free to move an unlimited number of squares in those directions. The remaining pieces gain entirely new powers when promoted.

==== Miscellaneous info ====
The pawn, lance, stone general, iron general, and knight can only move forward. Therefore, if one reaches the furthest rank (or the penultimate rank in the case of the knight), it is unable to move further, it must remain there until captured.

Pieces move either orthogonally (that is, forward, backward, or to the side, in the direction of one of the arms of a plus sign, +), or diagonally (in the direction of one of the arms of a multiplication sign, ×). The lion, knight, and furious fiend are exceptions.

=== Individual pieces ===
In the diagrams below, the different types of moves are coded by symbol and by color: Blue for step moves, yellow for jumps, green for multiple capture, and pink for range moves, as follows:

Notation
○	Steps a limited number of squares along a straight line.
☆	Jumps to this square, bypassing any intervening piece.
!	Igui (capture without moving). Counts as two steps.
☆	May jump directly to this square, or reach it through a multiple-step move.
│	Ranges along a straight line, crossing any number of empty squares
─	Ranges along a straight line, crossing any number of empty squares
╲	Ranges along a straight line, crossing any number of empty squares
╱	Ranges along a straight line, crossing any number of empty squares
╳	May turn 90° at this square.
┼	May turn 90° at this square.
∞	Can jump to any square on the board.

Piece names with a grey background are present at the start of the game; those with a blue background only appear with promotion. Betza's funny notation has been included in brackets for easier reference, with the extension that the notation xxxayyyK stands for an xxxK move possibly followed by an yyyK move, not necessarily in the same direction. By default continuation legs can go into all directions, but can be restricted to a single line by a modifier 'v' ("vertical", interpreted relative to the piece's current position on its path). The default modality of all legs is the ability to move and capture: other possibilities are specified explicitly. U denotes the universal leaper, a piece which can jump to any square on the board except the one that it is on.

There are many divergent descriptions in the Edo-era sources; the rules from The Chess Variant Pages are followed below, with the exception of the donkey (where all three Edo-era sources agree on a different move). Some divergent moves are detailed in the footnotes.

Pieces that gain entirely new powers when promoted
King (challenging 玉将 gyokushō or reigning 王将 ōshō)	Emperor 自在天王 jizai tennō
○ / ○ / ○; ○ / 玉 / ○; ○ / ○ / ○; The king can step one square in any direction, orthogonal or diagonal. (K); The king promotes to an emperor (right).	∞ / ∞ / ∞; ∞ / 天 / ∞; ∞ / ∞ / ∞; The emperor can jump to any empty square on the board. (Note: A parenthetical note on Japanese Wikipedia states that there are also records describing the power of the Emperor as that of a lion plus queen, like the Buddhist spirit (QNADaK).); It can jump to and capture any non-royal piece anywhere on the board.; It can capture a royal piece (prince, king, or the other emperor) anywhere on the board, but only if that piece is unprotected; capturing a protected royal piece is illegal. (U)
Deva 提婆 daiba	Teaching king 教王 kyōō
○ / / ○; ○ / 提; / / ○; The Deva can move one square orthogonally left.; It can move one square diagonally forward.; It can move one square diagonally backward to the right. (f[br]FlW) (Note: This is the description of the deva found in the SSZ. However, the SZ has the backward diagonal to the left rather than to the right (f[bl]FlW), while the SRZ shows a step in all four orthogonals and the two left-hand diagonals (WlF).); The Deva promotes to a teaching king (right).	╲ / / / / │ / / / / ╱; / ☆ / / / ☆ / / / ☆; / / ☆ / / ☆ / / ☆; / / / ! / ! / !; ─ / ☆ / ☆ / ! / 教 / ! / ☆ / ☆ / ─; / / / ! / ! / !; / / ☆ / / ☆ / / ☆; / ☆ / / / ☆ / / / ☆; ╱ / / / / │ / / / / ╲; The teaching king can move as either a lion dog or as a queen. (Note: In the SZ and SSZ, the power of the teaching king is described as 狛犬と奔王をあわせた動き "the combined movement of a lion-dog and a queen". Western descriptions claim this, or various variations of this, such as the power of a lion and a vice general from tenjiku shogi (KmaKmamaKBcppB), to be modern innovations. But their claim is based on a misunderstanding of the lion-dog move as a queen limited to three squares, which makes the move ascribed to the teaching king in the SZ and SSZ nonsensically tautologous.); It can move as a queen, free-ranging in any one direction, orthogonal or diagonal.; It has a triple-capture move in any direction, orthogonal or diagonal. (QavKafavK)
Dark spirit 無明 mumyō	Buddhist spirit 法性 hōsei
○ / / ○; / 無 / ○; ○; The dark spirit can move one square orthogonally right.; It can move one square diagonally forward.; It can move one square diagonally backward to the left. (f[bl]FrW) (Note: This is the description of the dark spirit in the SSZ. However, the SZ has the backward diagonal to the right rather than to the left (f[br]FrW), and the SRZ has it step in all four orthogonals and the two right-hand diagonals (WrF).); The dark spirit promotes to a Buddhist spirit (right).	╲ / / / │ / / / ╱; / ☆ / ☆ / ☆ / ☆ / ☆; / ☆ / ! / ! / ! / ☆; ─ / ☆ / ! / 性 / ! / ☆ / ─; / ☆ / ! / ! / ! / ☆; / ☆ / ☆ / ☆ / ☆ / ☆; ╱ / / / │ / / / ╲; The Buddhist spirit can move as a lion or as a queen. (Note: In the SZ and SSZ, the power of the Buddhist spirit is described as 獅子と奔王をあわせた動き "the combined movement of a lion and a queen".); It can move as a queen, free-ranging in any direction, orthogonal or diagonal.; It has a double-capture move in any combination of directions, orthogonal or diagonal. (QNADaK)
Gold general 金将 kinshō	Free gold 奔金 honkin
○ / ○ / ○; ○ / 金 / ○; / ○; A gold general can move one square in one of the four orthogonal directions; or; One square diagonally forward, giving it six possibilities.; It cannot move diagonally backward. (WfF); The gold general promotes to a free gold (right).	╲ / / / │ / / / ╱; / ╲ / / │ / / ╱; / / ╲ / │ / ╱; ─ / ─ / ─ / 奔 金 / ─ / ─ / ─; / / / │; / / / │; / / / │; A free gold can move any number of free squares in one of the four orthogonal directions; or; Any number of free squares diagonally forward, giving it six possibilities.; It cannot move diagonally backward. (RfB)
Silver general 銀将 ginshō	Free silver 奔銀 hongin
○ / ○ / ○; / 銀; ○ / / ○; A silver general can move one square in one of the four diagonal directions; or; One square straight forward, giving it five possibilities. (FfW); The silver general promotes to a free silver (right).	╲ / / / │ / / / ╱; / ╲ / / │ / / ╱; / / ╲ / │ / ╱; / / / 奔 銀; / / ╱ / / ╲; / ╱ / / / / ╲; ╱ / / / / / / ╲; A free silver can move any number of free squares in one of the four diagonal directions; or; Any number of free squares straight forward, giving it five possibilities. (BfR)
Copper general 銅将 dōshō	Free copper 奔銅 hondō
○ / ○ / ○; / 銅; / ○; The copper general can move one square orthogonally forward or backward; or; It can move one square diagonally forward. (fbWfF); The copper general promotes to a free copper (right).	╲ / / / │ / / / ╱; / ╲ / / │ / / ╱; / / ╲ / │ / ╱; / / / 奔 銅; / / / │; / / / │; / / / │; The free copper can move any number of free squares orthogonally forward or backward; or; It can move any number of free squares diagonally forward. (fbRfB)
Iron general 鉄将 tesshō	Free iron 奔鉄 hontetsu
○ / ○ / ○; / 鐵; The iron general can move one square forward, orthogonally or diagonally. (fK); Because it cannot move sideways or backward, an iron general can only reach a fraction of the squares on the board. The iron general promotes to a free iron (right). An iron general that reaches the far rank is trapped.	╲ / / / │ / / / ╱; / ╲ / / │ / / ╱; / / ╲ / │ / ╱; / / / 奔 鐵; The free iron can move any number of free squares forward, orthogonally or diagonally. (fQ); Because it cannot move sideways or backward, a free iron can only reach a fraction of the squares on the board. A free iron that reaches the far rank is trapped.
Tile general 瓦将 gashō	Free tile 奔瓦 honga
○ / / ○; / 瓦; / ○; The tile general can move one square diagonally forward or orthogonally backward. (fFbW); The tile general promotes to a free tile (right).	╲ / / / / / / ╱; / ╲ / / / / ╱; / / ╲ / / ╱; / / / 奔 瓦; / / / │; / / / │; / / / │; The free tile can move any number of free squares diagonally forward or orthogonally backward. (fBbR)
Stone general 石将 sekishō	Free stone 奔石 honseki
○ / / ○; / 石; The stone general can move one square diagonally forward. (fF); Because it cannot move orthogonally or backward, a stone general can only reach less than half the squares on the board. The stone general promotes to a free stone (right). A stone general that reaches the far rank is trapped.	╲ / / / / / / ╱; / ╲ / / / / ╱; / / ╲ / / ╱; / / / 奔 石; The free stone can move any number of free squares diagonally forward. (fB); Because it cannot move orthogonally or backward, a free stone can only reach less than half the squares on the board. A free stone that reaches the far rank is trapped.
Earth general 土将 doshō / Go-between 仲人 chūnin	Free earth 奔土 hondo / Free goer 奔人 honnin
○; 土; ○; The earth general and go-between can move one square orthogonally forward or backward. (fbW); The earth general and go-between promote to a free earth and free goer (right), respectively. These pieces and their promoted forms have the same range of movement; thus, it is unnecessary to give them separate names. The only difference between them, apart from the names, is their placement on the starting setup.	│; │; │; 奔 土; │; │; │; The free earth and free goer can move any number of free squares orthogonally forward or backward. (fbR); These pieces have the same range of movement; thus, it is unnecessary to give them separate names.
Drunken elephant 酔象 suizō	Prince 王子 ōji
○ / ○ / ○; ○ / 象 / ○; ○ / / ○; The drunken elephant can move one square in any direction, orthogonal or diagonal, except orthogonally backward. (FfrlW); The drunken elephant promotes to a prince (right).	○ / ○ / ○; ○ / 子 / ○; ○ / ○ / ○; Step: The prince can move one square in any direction. (K); If a player's opponent has a prince in play, both it and the king (or emperor) must be captured for that player to win.
Blind tiger 盲虎 mōko	Free tiger 奔虎 honko
○ / / ○; ○ / 虎 / ○; ○ / ○ / ○; The blind tiger can move one square in any direction, orthogonal or diagonal, except orthogonally forward. (FrlbW); The blind tiger promotes to a free tiger (right).	╲ / / / / / / ╱; / ╲ / / / / ╱; / / ╲ / / ╱; ─ / ─ / ─ / 奔 虎 / ─ / ─ / ─; / / ╱ / │ / ╲; / ╱ / / │ / / ╲; ╱ / / / │ / / / ╲; The free tiger can move any number of free squares in any direction, orthogonal or diagonal, except orthogonally forward. (BrlbR)
Ferocious leopard 猛豹 mōhyō	Free leopard 奔豹 honpyō
○ / ○ / ○; / 豹; ○ / ○ / ○; The ferocious leopard can move one square in one of the four diagonal directions; or; It can move one square orthogonally forward or backward. (FfbW); The ferocious leopard promotes to a free leopard (right).	╲ / / / │ / / / ╱; / ╲ / / │ / / ╱; / / ╲ / │ / ╱; / / / 奔 豹; / / ╱ / │ / ╲; / ╱ / / │ / / ╲; ╱ / / / │ / / / ╲; The free leopard can move any number of free squares in one of the four diagonal directions; or; It can move any number of free squares orthogonally forward or backward. (BfbR)
Coiled serpent 蟠蛇 banja	Free serpent 奔蛇 honja
/ ○; / 蛇; ○ / ○ / ○; The coiled serpent can move one square orthogonally forward or backward; or diagonally backward. (fbWbF) (Note: This is the description of the coiled serpent in the SZ and SSZ. However, the SRZ omits the backward orthogonal. (fWbF) This may be a copying error, as the free serpent moves directly backward in all three sources.); The coiled serpent promotes to a free serpent (right).	/ / / │; / / / │; / / / │; / / / 奔 蛇; / / ╱ / │ / ╲; / ╱ / / │ / / ╲; ╱ / / / │ / / / ╲; The free serpent can move any number of squares orthogonally forward or backward; or diagonally backward. (fbRbB)
Reclining dragon 臥龍 garyū	Free dragon 奔龍 honryū
/ ○; ○ / 臥 / ○; ○ / ○ / ○; The reclining dragon can move one square in one of the four orthogonal directions or diagonally backward. (WbF) (Note: This is the description of the reclining dragon found in the SZ and SSZ. However, the SRZ describes it as moving like a silver general (FfW).); The reclining dragon promotes to a free dragon (right).	/ / / │; / / / │; / / / │; ─ / ─ / ─ / 奔 龍 / ─ / ─ / ─; / / ╱ / │ / ╲; / ╱ / / │ / / ╲; ╱ / / / │ / / / ╲; The free dragon can move any number of squares in any of the four orthogonal directions, or diagonally backward. (RbB) (Note: In the SZ and SSZ, the free dragon is described as ranging forward and stepping backward, in both cases either orthogonally or diagonally (fQbK); this move was adopted by the TSA. In the SRZ it is described as ranging orthogonally forward or to the sides, and stepping backward orthogonally or diagonally, which retains the directions of the unpromoted piece in the SZ and SSZ, but not in its own description (frlRbK). Japanese Wikipedia notes this but illustrates it as moving simply as the free version of a reclining dragon, which is adopted by The Chess Variant Pages.)
Old monkey 古猿 koen	Mountain witch 山母 sambo
○ / / ○; / 猿; ○ / ○ / ○; Step: The old monkey can move one square in one of the four diagonal directions or orthogonally backward. (FbW) (Note: This is the description of the old monkey in the SZ and SSZ. However, the SRZ has the reverse, describing it as moving like a silver general. (FfW)); The old monkey promotes to a mountain witch (right).	╲ / / / / / / ╱; / ╲ / / / / ╱; / / ╲ / ○ / ╱; / / / 母; / / ╱ / │ / ╲; / ╱ / / │ / / ╲; ╱ / / / │ / / / ╲; The mountain witch can move any number of free squares along one of the four diagonal directions, or directly backward; or, It can step one square directly forward. (BbRfW) (Note: This is the description in the SZ and SSZ. However, the SRZ describes the mountain witch as moving like a bishop (B).); The mountain witch does not exist except as a promoted old monkey (left).
Chinese cock 淮鶏 waikei	Wizard stork 仙鶴 senkaku
○ / / ○; ○ / 鶏 / ○; / ○; The Chinese cock can move one square orthogonally sideways or backward; or diagonally forward. (rlbWfF) (Note: This is the description of the Chinese cock found in the SZ and SSZ. However, the SRZ describes it moving in any diagonal or directly backwards, but not to the sides. (FbW)); The Chinese cock promotes to a wizard stork (right).	╲ / / / │ / / / ╱; / ╲ / / │ / / ╱; / / ╲ / │ / ╱; / / / 仙; / / ╱ / ○ / ╲; / ╱ / / / / ╲; ╱ / / / / / / ╲; The wizard stork can move any number of free squares along one of the four diagonal directions, or directly forward; or, It can step one square directly backward. (BfRbW); The wizard stork does not exist except as a promoted Chinese cock (left).
Cat sword 猫刄 myōjin	Free cat 奔猫 honmyō
○ / / ○; / 猫; ○ / / ○; The cat sword can move one square in one of the four diagonal directions. (F); Because it cannot move orthogonally, a cat sword can only reach half the squares on the board.; The cat sword promotes to a free cat (right).	╲ / / / / / / ╱; / ╲ / / / / ╱; / / ╲ / / ╱; / / / 奔 猫; / / ╱ / / ╲; / ╱ / / / / ╲; ╱ / / / / / / ╲; A free cat can move any number of free squares in one of the four diagonal directions. (B); Because it cannot move orthogonally, a free cat can only reach half the squares on the board.; The free cat and bishop have the same range of movement; thus, it is unnecessary to give them separate names.
Lion 獅子 shishi	Furious fiend 奮迅 funshin
☆ / ☆ / ☆ / ☆ / ☆; ☆ / ! / ! / ! / ☆; ☆ / ! / 獅 / ! / ☆; ☆ / ! / ! / ! / ☆; ☆ / ☆ / ☆ / ☆ / ☆; The lion can move one square in any direction, orthogonal or diagonal; one or two times in one turn. That is, it can move in another direction after its first move.; It can capture on each move.; It can return to the square it started from after its first move, allowing the player to "skip" a turn.; It can capture one piece on any adjacent square without moving ("igūi") during a turn.; It can jump over an adjacent square and onto the second square in any direction, orthogonal or diagonal.; It can also jump at an angle intermediate between orthogonal and diagonal; amounting to one square orthogonally forward, sideways or backward plus one square diagonally in that direction, in a single motion. (NADaK); The restrictions for capturing a lion in chu shogi do not apply in maka dai dai shogi.; The lion promotes to a furious fiend (right).	☆ / / / ☆ / / / ☆; / ☆ / ☆ / ☆ / ☆ / ☆; / ☆ / ! / ! / ! / ☆; ☆ / ☆ / ! / 迅 / ! / ☆ / ☆; / ☆ / ! / ! / ! / ☆; / ☆ / ☆ / ☆ / ☆ / ☆; ☆ / / / ☆ / / / ☆; The furious fiend can move as a lion or as a lion dog. (NADaKafavK) (Note: 獅子に白犬の動きを兼ねたもの」 per the SZ and SSZ. The only advantage this confers is moving to a third square in any one direction. Western sources have it range three squares in addition to the lion's move, but this is based on the same misunderstanding of the lion dog.)
Phoenix 鳳凰 hōō	Golden bird 金翅 kinshi
☆ / / / / ☆; / / ○; / ○ / 鳳 / ○; / / ○; ☆ / / / / ☆; The phoenix can step one square in one of the four orthogonal directions.; It can jump to the second square in one of the four diagonal directions. (WA); The phoenix promotes to a golden bird (right).	○ / / / │ / / / ○; / ○ / / │ / / ○; / / ○ / │ / ○; / ○ / ○ / 翅 / ○ / ○; / / ○ / │ / ○; / ○ / / │ / / ○; ○ / / / │ / / / ○; The golden bird can move any number of free squares orthogonally forward or backward.; It can move one or two squares orthogonally sideways.; It can move one, two or three squares in the four diagonal directions. (fbRrlR2B3)
Kirin 麒麟 kirin	Great dragon 大龍 dairyū
/ / ☆; / ○ / / ○; ☆ / / 麒 / / ☆; / ○ / / ○; / / ☆; The kirin can step one square in one of the four diagonal directions.; It can jump to the second square in one of the four orthogonal directions. (FD); Because of its unusual movement, an unpromoted kirin can only reach half the squares on the board. The kirin promotes to a great dragon (right).	○ / / / / / / ○; / ○ / / ○ / / ○; / / ○ / ○ / ○; ─ / ─ / ─ / 大 / ─ / ─ / ─; / / ○ / ○ / ○; / ○ / / ○ / / ○; ○ / / / / / / ○; The great dragon can move any number of free squares orthogonally sideways.; It can move one or two squares orthogonally forward or backward.; It can move one, two or three squares in the four diagonal directions. (rlRfbR2B3)
Evil wolf 悪狼 akurō	Free wolf 奔狼 honrō
○ / ○ / ○; ○ / 狼 / ○; The evil wolf can move one square orthogonally sideways or forward; or diagonally forward. (frlK); The evil wolf promotes to a free wolf (right).	╲ / / / │ / / / ╱; / ╲ / / │ / / ╱; / / ╲ / │ / ╱; ─ / ─ / ─ / 奔 狼 / ─ / ─ / ─; The free wolf can move any number of squares orthogonally sideways or forward; or diagonally forward. (Note: The SZ says it can move any number of squares in any direction but orthogonally sideways, where it is restricted to move (not jump) up to five squares (BfbRrlR5); the SSZ says that it can move up to five squares orthogonally sideways and makes no mention of any other direction (rlR5); and the SRZ says that it can move any number of squares in the five directions of diagonally forward or orthogonally sideways or backwards (fBrlbR). TSA follows the SZ. Japanese Wikipedia notes this but illustrates it as simply the free version of the unpromoted piece, which matches none of these (frlQ); this is adopted by The Chess Variant Pages.)
Blind bear 盲熊 mōyū	Free bear 奔熊 hon'yū
○ / / ○; / 熊; ○ / │ / ○; / │; / │; The blind bear can move any number of free squares orthogonally backward; or; It can move one square in one of the four diagonal directions. (FbR) (Note: This is the description of the blind bear in the SZ and SSZ. However, the SRZ has a move of one square in all directions (K).); The blind bear promotes to a free bear (right).	╲ / / / / / / ╱; / ╲ / / / / ╱; / / ╲ / / ╱; ─ / ─ / ─ / 奔 熊 / ─ / ─ / ─; / / ╱ / / ╲; / ╱ / / / / ╲; ╱ / / / / / / ╲; The free bear can move any number of free squares in the four diagonal directions or orthogonally sideways. (BrlR) (Note: The SZ and SSZ also allow a jump to the second square diagonally (BrlRfA), but this is not mentioned in the SRZ, and is quite unusual for a shogi variant. In that case it is not clear if the free bear can clear two pieces (BpBp2BrlRpRp2RfA), if it can only clear one but then continue on as a ranging piece (BpBrlRpRfA), or if it has a range-jumping move, clearing any number of pieces, as in tenjiku shogi (BppBrlRppRfA). The Japanese Chu Shogi Association instead adds a knight's jump to the move pictured here (BrlRffN).); This is identical to the move of the free boar. It is not clear why the piece is called a "free bear", since most "free" pieces have movements relating simply to their original form (step movers turn into pieces ranging in the same directions), and this is not the case here.
Angry boar 嗔猪 shincho	Free boar 奔猪 honchu
/ ○; ○ / 嗔 / ○; / ○; The angry boar can move one square in one of the four orthogonal directions. (W); The angry boar promotes to a free boar (right).	╲ / / / / / / ╱; / ╲ / / / / ╱; / / ╲ / / ╱; ─ / ─ / ─ / 猪 / ─ / ─ / ─; / / ╱ / / ╲; / ╱ / / / / ╲; ╱ / / / / / / ╲; The free boar can move any number of free squares in the four diagonal directions or orthogonally sideways. (BrlR) (Note: This is the description of the free boar in the SZ and SSZ. However, in the SRZ it instead has ranging moves in the forward directions, orthogonal and diagonal. (fQ)); Logically speaking, the free boar should have moved as the free version of the angry boar, i.e. as a rook. This move may have originated because in the more popular variant chu shogi, there is a piece called the "free boar" with this move.
Old rat 老鼠 rōso	Bat 蝙蝠 kōmori (rarely Sino-Japanese hempuku)
○ / / / / ○; / ○ / / ○; / / 鼠; / / ○; / / ○; The old rat may move one or two squares diagonally forward or orthogonally backward. (fB2bR2) (Note: The movement of the old rat is not described in SZ or SSZ. The movement given here is its power in dai dai shogi.); The old rat promotes to a bat (right).	/ / / │; / / / │; / / / │; / / / 蝠; / / ╱ / / ╲; / ╱ / / / / ╲; ╱ / / / / / / ╲; The bat can move any number of free squares orthogonally forward or diagonally backward. (fRbB)
Non-promoting pieces
Queen 奔王 hōnnō
╲ / / / │ / / / ╱; / ╲ / / │ / / ╱; / / ╲ / │ / ╱; ─ / ─ / ─ / 奔 / ─ / ─ / ─; / / ╱ / │ / ╲; / ╱ / / │ / / ╲; ╱ / / / │ / / / ╲; The queen can move any number of free squares in any direction, orthogonal or diagonal. (Q)
Dragon king 龍王 ryūō	Dragon horse 龍馬 ryūme
/ / / │; / / / │; / / ○ / │ / ○; ─ / ─ / ─ / 龍 / ─ / ─ / ─; / / ○ / │ / ○; / / / │; / / / │; A dragon king can move any number of free squares in one of the four orthogonal directions; or; It can move one square in one of the four diagonal directions. (FR)	╲ / / / / / / ╱; / ╲ / / / / ╱; / / ╲ / ○ / ╱; / / ○ / 馬 / ○; / / ╱ / ○ / ╲; / ╱ / / / / ╲; ╱ / / / / / / ╲; A dragon horse can move any number of free squares in one of the four diagonal directions; or; It can move one square in one of the four orthogonal directions. (WB)
Pieces that promote (or demote) to gold general
Lance 香車 kyōsha	Reverse chariot 反車 hensha
│; │; │; 香; A lance can move any number of free squares orthogonally forward. (fR); An unpromoted lance that reaches the far rank is trapped.	│; │; │; 反; │; │; │; The reverse chariot can move any number of free squares orthogonally forward or backward. (fbR)
Lion dog 狛犬 komainu
☆ / / / ☆ / / / ☆; / ☆ / / ☆ / / ☆; / / ! / ! / !; ☆ / ☆ / ! / 狛 / ! / ☆ / ☆; / / ! / ! / !; / ☆ / / ☆ / / ☆; ☆ / / / ☆ / / / ☆; Lion move/triple capture: The lion dog can make a three-step lion move along any one of the eight orthogonal or diagonal directions. That is, unlike the lion itself, but like the soaring eagle and horned falcon, it is restricted to moving along a straight line and cannot move to the in-between squares. This lion power includes jumping, igui, and skipping a turn.; A piece may be captured on all three steps.; The lion dog may capture a piece on the first and second square, and then retreat to the first square. Or it may snatch a piece off the first square as in normal igui. (Note however that it may not then continue in the opposite direction: it is restricted to one orthogonal or diagonal.); It may jump to the second square, and then continue to the third square, capturing up to two pieces. Or it may jump directly to the third square.; It is not required to take all three steps. (KavKafavK) (Note: Western sources only let the lion dog range three squares in any direction (Q3), but that makes the teaching king's move (lion dog plus queen) pleonastic.)
Wrestler 力士 rikishi	Guardian of the Gods 金剛 kongō
○ / / / / / / ○; / ○ / / / / ○; / / ○ / / ○; / / ○ / 力 / ○; / / ○ / / ○; / ○ / / / / ○; ○ / / / / / / ○; The wrestler can move up to three squares in one of the four diagonal directions, or; It can move one square orthogonally sideways. (B3rlW) (Note: This is the description in the SZ and SSZ. However, the SRZ says the wrestler may move up to three squares diagonally or one square orthogonally, without restricting the latter to the sides (B3W).)	/ / / ○; / / / ○; / / ○ / ○ / ○; ○ / ○ / ○ / 剛 / ○ / ○ / ○; / / / ○; / / / ○; / / / ○; The guardian of the Gods can move up to three squares in one of the four orthogonal directions; or; It can move one square diagonally forward. (R3fF)
Buddhist devil 羅刹 rasetsu	She-devil 夜叉 yasha
○ / / / / / / ○; / ○ / / / / ○; / / ○ / / ○; / / ○ / 羅 / ○; / / / ○; The Buddhist devil can move up to three squares diagonally forward; or; It can move one square orthogonally sideways or backward. (fB3rlbW) (Note: Japanese Wikipedia shows only forward diagonal moves for the Buddhist devil (fB3), but the wording is simply that it may move diagonally up to three squares (B3).)	/ / / / / ○; / / / / / ○; / / / / / ○; / / / ○ / / ○ / / ○; / / / / ○ / ○ / ○; ○ / ○ / ○ / ○ / ○ / 叉 / ○ / ○ / ○ / ○ / ○; / / / / ○ / ○ / ○; / / / ○ / / ○ / / ○; / / / / / ○; / / / / / ○; / / / / / ○; The she-devil can move one or two squares in one of the four diagonal directions; or; It can move up to five squares in one of the four orthogonal directions. (R5B2) (Note: This is the description of the she-devil in the SZ and SSZ. However, the SRZ does not mention the orthogonal move, only the one-to-two-step diagonal move (B2).)
Flying dragon 飛龍 hiryū	Violent ox 猛牛 mōgyū
○ / / / / ○; / ○ / / ○; / / 龍; / ○ / / ○; ○ / / / / ○; The flying dragon can move one or two squares in one of the four diagonal directions. (B2); Because it cannot move orthogonally, a flying dragon can only reach half the squares on the board.	/ / ○; / / ○; ○ / ○ / 牛 / ○ / ○; / / ○; / / ○; The violent ox can move one or two squares in one of the four orthogonal directions. (R2)
Knight 桂馬 keima	Donkey 驢馬 roba
☆ / / ☆; / 桂; A knight jumps at an angle intermediate between orthogonal and diagonal, amounting to one square forward plus one square diagonally forward, in a single motion. That is, it has a choice of two forward destinations. (ffN); The knight ignores intervening pieces on the way to its destination, though its destination square must of course be either empty, or occupied by an opponent's piece (in which case the opponent's piece is captured), just as with any other moving piece.	/ ☆; / ○; ○ / 驢 / ○; / ○; / ☆; The donkey can move one square in one of the four orthogonal directions; or; It can jump to the second square orthogonally forward or backward. (WfbD) (Note: This is the description of the donkey in the SZ and SSZ, while the SRZ says 「上下踊り二目、踊らざれば一目、猛牛のごとし」, suggesting that it can jump to the second square "above or under", otherwise it can move like violent ox does, but only for one square. Basically identical to the description in the SZ and SSZ.); Western sources do not have the vertical step move, restricting the donkey to half of the squares.
Capricorn 摩𩹄 makatsu	Hook mover 鉤行 kōgyō
╳ / / ╱ / / ╲ / / ╳; / ╳ / / / / ╳; ╱ / / ╳ / / ╳ / / ╲; / / / 摩; ╲ / / ╳ / / ╳ / / ╱; / ╳ / / / / ╳; ╳ / / ╲ / / ╱ / / ╳; The Capricorn can make the equivalent of two moves of a bishop: It can move any number of free squares in one of the four diagonal directions, then any number of free squares in a perpendicular direction.; It is not required to make a perpendicular move.; It may only capture once, and cannot continue after capturing. (BmaB) (Note: The Edo-era rules appear to say only that the capricorn and hook mover move two times as a bishop (aB) or rook (aR), implying that they may capture twice. There also appears to be no mention of needing to capture in order to move, which occurs in some Western sources. However, making these pieces able to capture twice makes the hook mover move differently in dai-dai and maka-dai-dai shogi, and hence is probably an error.); Because it cannot move orthogonally, an unpromoted capricorn can only reach half the squares on the board.	/ ─ / ─ / ┼ / ─ / ─; │ / / ─ / ┼ / ─ / / │; │ / │ / / ┼ / / │ / │; ┼ / ┼ / ┼ / 行 / ┼ / ┼ / ┼; │ / │ / / ┼ / / │ / │; │ / / ─ / ┼ / ─ / / │; / ─ / ─ / ┼ / ─ / ─; The hook mover can make the equivalent of two moves of a rook: It can move any number of free squares in one of the four orthogonal directions, then any number of free squares in a perpendicular direction.; It is not required to make a perpendicular move.; It may only capture once, and cannot continue after capturing. (RmaR)
Bishop 角行 kakugyō	Rook 飛車 hisha
╲ / / / / / / ╱; / ╲ / / / / ╱; / / ╲ / / ╱; / / / 角; / / ╱ / / ╲; / ╱ / / / / ╲; ╱ / / / / / / ╲; A bishop can move any number of free squares in one of the four diagonal directions. (B); Because it cannot move orthogonally, an unpromoted bishop can only reach half the squares on the board.	/ / / │; / / / │; / / / │; ─ / ─ / ─ / 飛 / ─ / ─ / ─; / / / │; / / / │; / / / │; The rook can move any number of free squares in one of the four orthogonal directions. (R)
Vertical mover 竪行 shugyō	Side mover 横行 ōgyō
/ │; / │; / │; ○ / 竪 / ○; / │; / │; / │; The vertical mover can move any number of free squares orthogonally forward or backward; or; It can move one square orthogonally sideways. (fbRW)	/ / / ○; ─ / ─ / ─ / 横 / ─ / ─ / ─; / / / ○; The side mover can move any number of free squares orthogonally sideways; or; It can move one square orthogonally forward or backward. (rlRW)
Left chariot 左車 sasha	Right chariot 右車 usha
╲ / / / │; / ╲ / / │; / / ╲ / │; / / / 左; / / / ○ / ╲; / / / / / ╲; / / / / / / ╲; The left chariot can move any number of free squares orthogonally forward.; It can move any number of free squares diagonally forward to the left.; It can move any number of free squares diagonally backward to the right.; It can move one square orthogonally backward. (fR[fl][br]BbW)	/ / / │ / / / ╱; / / / │ / / ╱; / / / │ / ╱; / / / 右; / / ╱ / ○; / ╱; ╱; The right chariot can move any number of free squares orthogonally forward.; It can move any number of free squares diagonally forward to the right.; It can move any number of free squares diagonally backward to the left.; It can move one square orthogonally backward. (fR[fr][bl]BbW)
Side flier 横飛 ōhi	Pawn 歩兵 fuhyō
/ / ○ / / ○; ─ / ─ / ─ / 横 飛 / ─ / ─ / ─; / / ○ / / ○; The side flier can move any number of free squares orthogonally sideways; or; It can move one square in one of the four diagonal directions. (rlRF) (Note: This is the description of the side flier found in the SZ and SSZ. However, the SRZ describes the diagonal step only in the forward directions (rlRfF).)	○; 歩; The pawn can move one square forward. (fW); An unpromoted pawn that reaches the far rank is trapped.

=== Repetition ===
A player may not make a move if the resulting position is one that has previously occurred in the game with the same player to move. This is called repetition (千日手 sennichite). Note that certain pieces have the ability to pass in certain situations (lions, lion dogs, furious fiends, teaching kings, and Buddhist spirits). Such a pass move leaves the position unchanged, but it does not violate the repetition rule, as it will now be the turn of the other player to move. Of course, two consecutive passes are not possible, as the first player will see the same position as before.

However, evidence from chu shogi problems suggests that this at least does not apply to a player who is in check or whose pieces are attacked, as otherwise one could win via perpetual check or perpetual pursuit. The modern chu shogi rule as applied by the Japanese Chu Shogi Association (JCSA) is as follows, and presumably maka dai dai shogi should be similar. If one side is making attacks on other pieces (however futile) with his moves in the repeat cycle, and the other is not, the attacking side must deviate, while in case of checking the checker must deviate regardless of whether the checked side attacks other pieces. In the case of consecutive passes, the side passing first must deviate, making turn passing to avoid zugzwang pointless if the opponent is in a position where he can pass his turn too. Only the fourth repetition is forbidden by these rules. If none of these are applicable, repetition is a draw.

=== Check and mate ===
When a player makes a move such that the opponent's king, emperor or prince (sole one in play) could be captured on the following move, the move is said to give check to the king, emperor or prince; the king, emperor or prince is said to be in check. If a player's king, emperor or prince is in check and no legal move by that player will get the king, emperor or prince out of check, the checking move is also a mate, and effectively wins the game. If a player has both a king (or emperor) and prince in play, then the player need not move only one out of check.

Recall that an emperor can only capture a royal piece if that royal piece is unprotected. (Capturing non-royal protected pieces is legal, just almost always a very poor move.) This prohibition applies even if the opponent's last royal piece is being captured: here "protected" means that the opponent could recapture if we ignore that he has just lost his last royal.

=== Game end ===
A player who captures the opponent's sole remaining king, emperor, or prince wins the game. Thus a player who is checkmated or stalemated will lose. In practice this rarely happens; a player will resign when loss is inevitable and the king will be taken on the opponent's next move (as in International Chess) because of the tradition that it is seen as an embarrassment to lose. The very artificial situation of a smothered stalemate, where no moves are possible (even those that would expose the king), is not covered in the historical sources. On their pages for chu shogi and dai shogi, The Chess Variant Pages rule this as a loss for the stalemated player, for definiteness.

A player who makes an illegal move loses immediately. (This rule may be relaxed in casual games.)

== Game notation ==
The method used in English-language texts to express shogi moves was established by George Hodges in 1976. It is derived from the algebraic notation used for chess, but differs in several respects. Modifications have been made for maka dai dai shogi.

A typical example is P-8g. The first letter represents the piece moved (see above). Promoted pieces have a + added in front of the letter. (e.g., +OM for a mountain witch (promoted old monkey). The designation of the piece is followed by a symbol indicating the type of move: - for an ordinary move or x for a capture. Next is the designation for the square on which the piece lands. This consists of a number representing the file and a lowercase letter representing the rank, with 1a being the top right corner (as seen from Black's point of view) and 19s being the bottom left corner. (This method of designating squares is based on Japanese convention, which, however, uses Japanese numerals instead of letters. For example, the square 2c is denoted by 2三 in Japanese.)

If a lion captures by 'igūi’, the square of the piece being captured is used instead of the destination square, and this is preceded by the symbol '!'. If a double or triple capture is made, then it is added after the first capture.

If a move entitles the player to promote the piece, then a + is added to the end to signify that the promotion was taken, or an = to indicate that it was declined. For example, CSx7c= indicates a cat sword capturing on 7c without promoting.

In cases where the above notation would be ambiguous, the designation of the start square is added after the designation for the piece in order to make clear which piece is meant.

Moves are commonly numbered as in chess.

== Hishigata shogi ==
Sean Humby created a variant of maka dai dai shogi called Hishigata shogi. It was motivated by criticisms that maka dai dai takes a very long time to finish, and that the more interesting pieces have little opportunity for play. The only difference is in the setup, which places the opposing pieces close together and leaves the armies' rear flanks exposed, though Humby recommends that the teaching king be played as the weaker Western variant (as a queen), probably referring to the single alternative offered by Sean Evans' ShogiVar software, which is Queen plus 3-step King with full lion power, no longer believed to be the correct move by anyone.

=== Setup ===
In the hishigata setup, only one rank is left empty between the opposing armies. This is indicated with a darker shading in the diagram below.

横	左	猪	鉄	蛇	鉄	猪	右	横
	銀	桂	狼	行	狼	桂	銀	
		金	麒	玉	鳳	金		
			熊	象	熊			
				力				
		角		摩		角		
			提	奔	無			

SM	LC	AB	I	Co	I	AB	RC	SM
	S	N	EW	HM	EW	N	S	
		G	Kr	K	Ph	G		
			BB	DE	BB			
				W				
		B		Ca		B		
			Dv	Q	DS			

Legend
AB: Angry Boar	B: Bishop	BB: Blind Bear
Ca: Capricorn	Co: Coiled Serpent	Dv: Deva
DE: Drunk Elephant	DS: Dark Spirit	EW: Evil Wolf
G: Gold General	HM: Hook Mover	I: Iron General
K: King	Kr: Kirin	LC: Left Chariot
N: Knight	Ph: Phoenix	Q: Queen
RC: Right Chariot	S: Silver General	SM: Side Mover
W: Wrestler		

== Maka dai shogi ==
There are some minor attempts to revive maka dai dai shogi in Japan, with a few rule changes. This revived form of the game is called maka dai shogi. The SZ and SSZ description of the furious fiend (lion + lion dog) is followed. The kirin and phoenix promote to the lion and queen, as in chu shogi. Promotion becomes mandatory on capture, but capturing a Deva or dark spirit does not result in promotion to teaching king or Buddhist spirit respectively. Only capturing the promoted forms of these pieces has that result. The blind bear's move is changed to FsW (one square in any direction but directly forward or backward), making it consistent with the free bear (which moves as shown here with no forward diagonal jump). The "free" pieces resulting from promotion have been changed to "ski-sliders" (skipping the first two squares before sliding, similar to the picket in Tamerlane chess), and many of the limited-range pieces have been changed to cannon-like hoppers that jump to the furthest square in their range, capturing any enemy pieces they leap over. The donkey loses its vertical stepping move and the knight has become a forward-only alfil. Many other minor changes are present: for example, the angry boar is now frlW and the old rat is fWbF.

== Strategy ==
=== Piece values ===
According to the German Chu Shogi Association, the average values of the pieces are (using the interpretations of The Shogi Association, e.g. the lion dog as only a three-square range mover with no lion power):

Average piece values
Piece name	Approximate value	Promotion	Approximate value
King	4	Emperor	∞
Drunk Elephant	3	Prince	4
Hook Mover	148	Gold General	3
Capricorn	70	Gold General	3
Lion	16	Furious Fiend	17
Queen	17	—	—
Dragon King	12	—	—
Dragon Horse	11	—	—
She-Devil	8	Gold General	3
Lion Dog	7	Gold General	3
Left Chariot	7	Gold General	3
Right Chariot	7	Gold General	3
Guardian of the Gods	4	Gold General	3
Wrestler	4	Gold General	3
Buddhist Devil	3	Gold General	3
Rook	9	Gold General	3
Bishop	8	Gold General	3
Vertical Mover	5	Gold General	3
Side Mover	5	Gold General	3
Side Flier	5	Gold General	3
Reverse Chariot	5	Gold General	3
Lance	4	Gold General	3
Flying Dragon	3	Gold General	3
Violent Ox	3	Gold General	3
Donkey	1	Gold General	3
Knight	1	Gold General	3
Pawn	1	Gold General	3
Dark Spirit	2	Buddhist Spirit	27
Deva	2	Teaching King	17
Gold General	3	Free Gold	17
Evil Wolf	3	Free Wolf	17
Blind Tiger	3	Free Tiger	15
Ferocious Leopard	3	Free Leopard	14
Blind Bear	3	Free Bear	14
Chinese Cock	2	Wizard Stork	14
Angry Boar	2	Free Boar	14
Silver General	2	Free Silver	13
Reclining Dragon	2	Free Dragon	12
Copper General	2	Free Copper	12
Phoenix	3	Golden Bird	11
Old Monkey	2	Mountain Witch	11
Iron General	2	Free Iron	11
Kirin	3	Great Dragon	10
Coiled Serpent	1	Free Serpent	8
Tile General	1	Free Tile	4
Old Rat	2	Bat	7
Cat Sword	2	Free Cat	9
Stone General	1	Free Stone	6
Earth General	1	Free Earth	5
Go-Between	1	Free Goer	5

These average values do not take into account the special status of the king or prince as royal pieces, or the emperor as a disposable piece if other royals are present. They have also been normalized so that the pawn is worth 1 point to avoid fractions. Additionally, pieces change value if they have a good chance of promotion. This is particularly significant for the hook mover and capricorn, which are the two most powerful pieces in the game, but "promote" to the weak gold general.

== Notes on pieces with conflicting descriptions ==
These descriptions are taken from Japanese Wikipedia, which references the Edo-era publications 象戯図式 Shōgi Zushiki (SZ), 諸象戯図式 Sho Shōgi Zushiki (SSZ), and 象棋六種之図式 Shōgi Rokushu no Zushiki (SRZ). The first two are generally though not always in agreement, but the third differs in the case of most pieces which are not found in smaller shogi variants.

== See also ==
- Shogi variant
- Wa shogi
- Chu shogi
- Heian dai shogi
- Dai shogi
- Tenjiku shogi
- Dai dai shogi
- Tai shogi
- Taikyoku shogi
