= Chu shogi =

Shogi variant

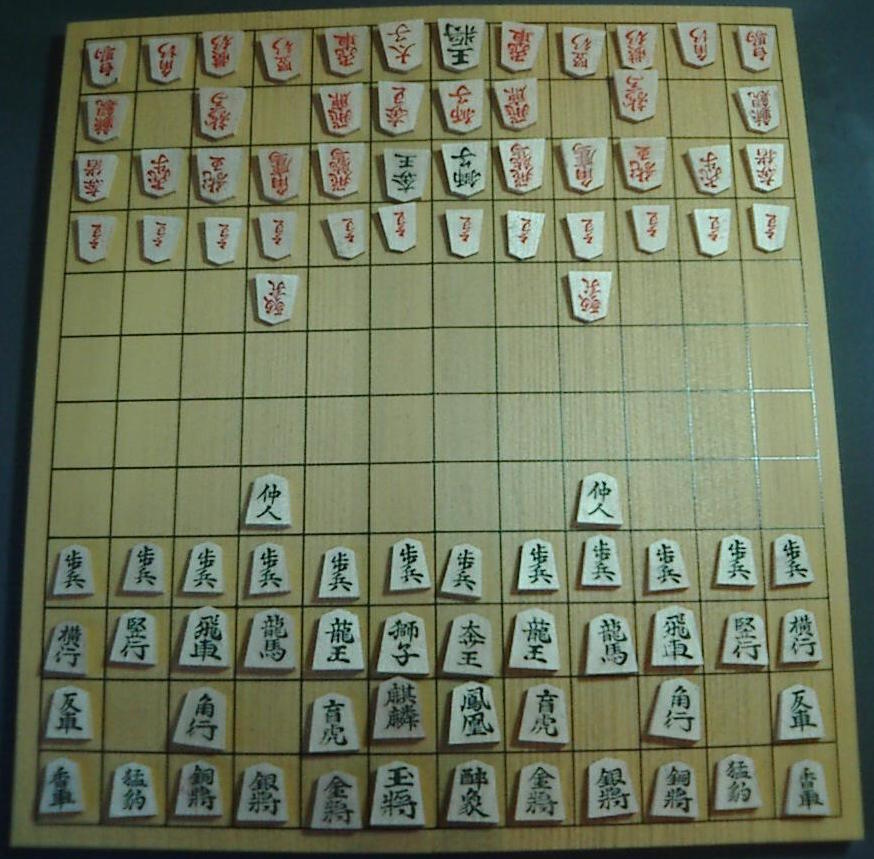
- Chu shogi wood set. One side's pieces are all promoted (except for the unpromotable pieces), and show as red.
- Years active: Early 14th century to present
- Genres: Board game Abstract strategy game
- Players: 2
- Setup time: 2+ minutes
- Playing time: 6–8 hours or more
- Chance: None
- Skills: strategy, tactics
- Synonyms: Middle shogi

Chu shogi (中将棋 chū shōgi or Middle Shogi) is a strategy board game native to Japan. It is similar to modern shogi (sometimes called Japanese chess) in its rules and gameplay. Its name means "mid-sized shogi", from a time when there were three sizes of shogi variants that were regularly being played. Chu shogi seems to have been developed in the early 14th century as a derivative of dai shogi ('large shogi'). There are earlier references, but it is not clear that they refer to the game as we now know it.

With fewer pieces than dai shogi, the game is considered more exciting, and was still commonly played in Japan in 1928–1939, especially in the Keihanshin region. The game largely died out after World War II despite the advocacy of prominent shogi players such as Okazaki Shimei and Ōyama Yasuharu (who played chu shogi when young and credited it with the development of his personal cautious and tenacious shogi style). In 1976, there were about 30–40 masters of the game. It has gained some adherents in the West, having been praised as "the best of all large chess games" by David Pritchard, and still maintains a society (the Chushogi Renmei, or Japanese Chu Shogi Association) and an online following in Japan.

The main reference work in English is the Middle Shogi Manual by George F. Hodges.

== Rules of the game ==
=== Objective ===
The objective of the game is to capture the opponent's king and, if present, the prince, which counts as a second king. These two pieces are called "royal pieces", as the game is lost when a player is left without any of them. Alternatively, under the rules of the Japanese Chu Shogi Association, it suffices to capture all the opponent's other pieces, leaving a bare king or a bare prince, whereupon the player wins and the game ends early, provided that one's own king is not immediately bared or captured on the next move. Unlike standard shogi, pieces may not be dropped back into play after capture.

=== Gameplay ===
Two players alternate making a move, with Black moving first. (The pieces are not differentiated by color, but rather by facing of the pieces, with the "sharp" end pointed at the opponent; the traditional chess terms "Black" and "White" are only used to indicate who plays first, and to differentiate the sides during discussions of the game.) A move consists of moving a piece either to an empty square on the board or to a square occupied by an opposing piece, thus capturing that piece; and optionally of promoting the moving piece, if the move enters the promotion zone, or if it is a capture and any part of it is in the promotion zone.

=== Game equipment ===
Two players, Black and White (or 先手 sente and 後手 gote), play on a board ruled into a grid of 12 ranks (rows) and 12 files (columns), with a total of 144 squares. The squares are undifferentiated by marking or color, unlike a Western chess board.

Each player has a set of 46 pieces of 21 different types, and each piece has its name written on it in Japanese kanji. The writing is typically in black. On the reverse side of most pieces (i.e. except the king, queen, and lion) there are characters to indicate the piece's promoted rank, typically written in red. The pieces are wedge-shaped and their orientation indicates which player they belong to, as they point toward the opposing side. In all, the players must remember 28 moves for these pieces. The pieces are of slightly different sizes; from largest to smallest (most to least powerful) they are:

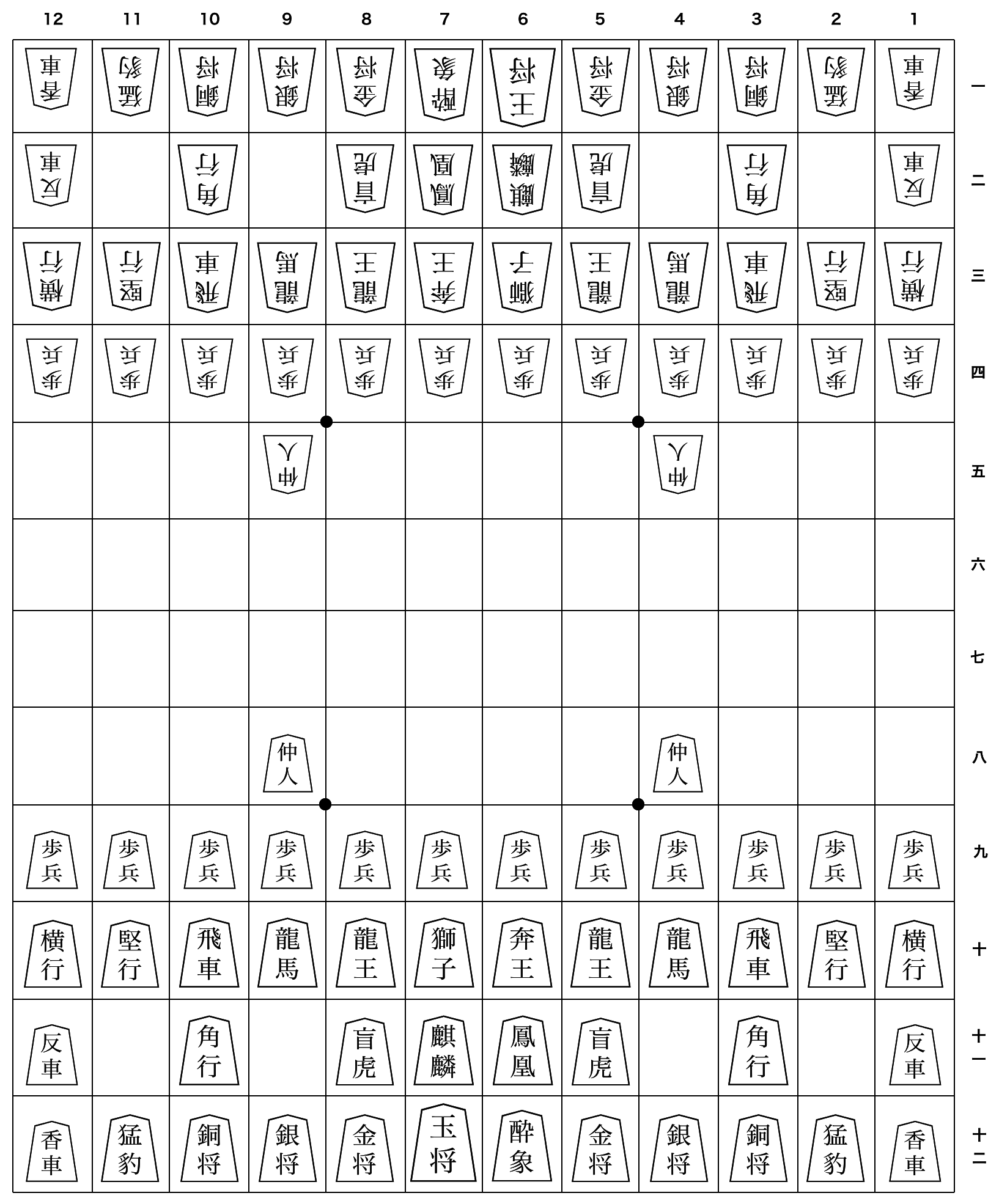
Initial setup with the full name in kanji on each piece.

- 1 King
- 1 Queen (also referred to as a "running/rushing/free king", which is a direct translation of the Japanese name)
- 1 Lion
- 2 Dragon kings
- 2 Dragon horses
- 2 Rooks
- 2 Bishops
- 1 Kirin (sometimes called "Kylin", an anglicisation)
- 1 Phoenix
- 1 Drunk elephant
- 2 Blind tigers
- 2 Ferocious leopards
- 2 Gold generals
- 2 Silver generals
- 2 Copper generals
- 2 Vertical movers
- 2 Side movers
- 2 Reverse chariots
- 2 Lances
- 2 Go-betweens
- 12 Pawns

Listed below are the pieces of the game and, if they promote, the pieces they promote to. Names are rough translations that have become somewhat standardized in English. Pieces are listed alphabetically by their English name.

The promotions apply only to pieces that start out with the ranks in the left-most column. That is, pieces with these ranks written in black; promoted pieces with those same ranks written in red may not be promoted further. Pieces that only appear upon promotion, that is, names that only occur written in red, are marked with an asterisk. The king, queen, and lion do not promote.

Pieces
Piece name	Kanji	Romaji	Abbrev.	Promotion	Short name	Betza notation
bishop (lit. 'angle mover')	角行	kakugyō^{3}	角	dragon horse	bishop	B
blind tiger	盲虎	mōko^{2}	虎	flying stag	tiger	FrlbW
copper general	銅将	dōshō	銅	side mover	copper	fKbW
dragon horse	龍馬	ryūma^{1}	馬	horned falcon	horse	BW
dragon king	龍王	ryūō	龍	soaring eagle	dragon	RF
drunk elephant	酔象	suizō	象	prince	elephant	FfrlW
ferocious leopard	猛豹	mōhyō	豹	bishop	leopard	FfbW
*flying ox	飛牛	higyū	牛	(promoted vertical mover)	ox	BfbR
*flying stag	飛鹿	hiroku	鹿	(promoted blind tiger)	stag	fbRK
*free boar	奔猪	honcho	猪	(promoted side mover)	boar	BrlR
go-between	仲人	chūnin	仲	drunk elephant	go-between	fbW
gold general	金将	kinshō^{3}	金	rook	gold	WfF
*horned falcon	角鷹	kakuō	鷹	(promoted dragon horse)	falcon	BrlbRf[avW]fD
king (challenging) (lit. 'jade general')	玉将	gyokushō	玉	—	king	K
king (reigning) (lit. 'king general')	王将	ōshō	王	—	king	K
kirin	麒麟	kirin	麒	lion	kirin	FD
lance (lit. 'incense chariot')	香車	kyōsha^{2}	香	white horse	lance	fR
lion	獅子	shishi	獅	—	lion	NAD[aK]
pawn (lit. 'foot soldier')	歩兵	fuhyō^{2}	歩	gold general	pawn	fW
phoenix	鳳凰	hōō	鳳	queen	phoenix	WA
*prince	太子	taishi	太	(promoted drunk elephant)	prince	K
queen (lit. 'running king')	奔王	honnō^{1}	奔	—	queen	Q
reverse chariot	反車	hensha^{1}	反	whale	chariot	fbR
rook (lit. 'flying chariot')	飛車	hisha^{3}	飛	dragon king	rook	R
side mover	横行	ōgyō	横	free boar	side mover	WrlR
silver general	銀将	ginshō	銀	vertical mover	silver	FfW
*soaring eagle	飛鷲	hijū	鷲	(promoted dragon king)	eagle	RbBf[avF]fA
vertical mover	竪行	shugyō	竪	flying ox	vertical mover	WfbR
*whale	鯨鯢	keigei^{2}	鯨	(promoted reverse chariot)	whale	fRbQ
*white horse	白駒	hakku^{1}	駒	(promoted lance)	white horse	fQbR

^{1} The pronunciations of 龍馬, 奔王, 反車, and 白駒 are irregular. The regular forms ryūme, hon’ō, hansha, and hakuku are also seen.
^{2} The alternative pronunciations 盲虎 mekura, 香車 yari, 歩兵 hohei or fu, and 鯨鯢 geigei are also sometimes seen.
^{3} Bishops, gold generals, and rooks arising from promotion (not the ones present initially) are sometimes given the alternate readings chorokaku, と金 tokin, and kinbisha respectively.

Below is a diagram showing the setup of the players' pieces. The board setup is symmetrical: the way one player sees their own pieces is the same way that the opposing player sees their pieces.

Setup
12	11	10	9	8	7	6	5	4	3	2	1
L	FL	C	S	G	DE	K	G	S	C	FL	L	a
RC		B		BT	Ph	Kr	BT		B		RC	b
SM	VM	R	DH	DK	Q	Ln	DK	DH	R	VM	SM	c
P	P	P	P	P	P	P	P	P	P	P	P	d
			GB					GB				e
												f
												g
			GB					GB				h
P	P	P	P	P	P	P	P	P	P	P	P	i
SM	VM	R	DH	DK	Ln	Q	DK	DH	R	VM	SM	j
RC		B		BT	Kr	Ph	BT		B		RC	k
L	FL	C	S	G	K	DE	G	S	C	FL	L	l

Setup legend

Abbreviation		Name
B	B	bishop
BT	T	blind tiger
C	C	copper general
DE	E	drunk elephant
DH	H	dragon horse
DK	D	dragon king
FL	F	ferocious leopard

Abbreviation		Name
G	G	gold general
GB	I	go-between
K	K	king
Kr	O	kirin
L	L	lance
Ln	N	lion
P	P	pawn

Abbreviation		Name
Ph	X	phoenix
Q	Q	queen
R	R	rook
RC	A	reverse chariot
S	S	silver general
SM	M	side mover
VM	V	vertical mover

In some contexts, one-letter abbreviations may be necessary. Those used in WinBoard are given in the second column of abbreviations. Promoted pieces are notated by a + in front of the symbol; thus a white horse is +L, and a promoted gold (now a rook) is +G.

Sometimes the kirin is abbreviated Ky (for kylin), and the queen FK (for free king).

=== Promotion ===
The promotion zone is the 'enemy camp', the farthest four ranks of the board, which are mostly occupied by the opposing player's pieces when the board is first set up. When a promotable piece enters the promotion zone from outside, or makes a capture starting within the promotion zone, it has the option of "promoting" to a more powerful rank. Promotion is not mandatory, and in some cases it may be beneficial to leave the piece unpromoted. (For example, the pawn, gold general, silver general, copper general, ferocious leopard, phoenix, kirin, vertical mover, side mover, and go-between all lose some of their powers upon promoting, so that there may be immediate tactical reasons for deferral, even though they all gain much more than they lose.) Promotion is permanent and promoted pieces may not revert to their original rank, nor promote a second time. If a piece is not promoted upon entering the promotion zone, then it may only promote by making a capture, or by exiting and reentering the zone. Pawns are an exception (see below).

Promotion is effected by turning the piece over after it moves, revealing the name of its promoted rank. Promoting a piece has the effect of changing how that piece moves. See below. For example, promoting a kirin turns it into a lion, and thereafter it behaves exactly like the original lion, even for the lion-trading rules. (Which can be a reason to defer promotion of a kirin.) A rook obtained by promoting a gold differs from an original rook, though, in that the latter can still promote (to dragon king), while the former cannot.

If a pawn reaches the furthest rank, it gets a second opportunity to promote on a non-capture. (This is because the pawn can never leave the zone, and there is a legitimate reason to defer its promotion: a pawn can stand between two protected lions without allowing either player to trade them, which is something a promoted pawn – a gold general – cannot do.) No such exception exists or is needed for lances (the only other piece with no backward moves) as there is never any reason to defer promotion of a lance in the first place: therefore, a lance that reaches the furthest rank without promoting becomes an immobile "dead piece" (死に駒). This last-rank promotion of pawns can likewise be declined, leaving the pawn as an immobile "dead piece". (Unlike for lances, this might still be done with reason, again because of the lion-trading rules.)

According to Okazaki Shimei, the go-between can likewise promote on the furthest rank on a non-capture. In the past, the Japanese Chu Shogi Association used this rule, but later repealed it because the go-between can go backwards. Some of the new rules given by Okazaki and not present in the Edo-period texts seem to be late innovations in the history of chu shogi from the Showa period.

=== Piece movement ===
An opposing piece is captured by displacement: That is, if a piece moves to a square occupied by an opposing piece, the opposing piece is displaced and removed from the board. A piece cannot move to a square occupied by a friendly piece, that is, by another piece controlled by the moving player.

Each piece on the game moves in a characteristic pattern. Pieces move either orthogonally (that is, forward, backward, left, or right, in the direction of one of the arms of a plus sign, +), or diagonally (in the direction of one of the arms of a multiplication sign, ×). The lion is the sole exception, in that it is not required to move in a straight line.

As stated earlier, this game is based on dai shogi and all of the pieces of this game can be found in dai shogi. The eight types of pieces that were removed were all rather weak and all promoted to gold generals. Furthermore, the larger board of dai shogi makes the slow-moving step movers even slower. All of this made for comparatively dull gameplay.

Many pieces are capable of several kinds of movement, with the type of movement most often depending on the direction in which they move. The movement categories are:

==== Step movers ====
Some pieces move only one square at a time. If a friendly piece occupies an adjacent square, the moving piece may not move in that direction; if an opposing piece is there, it may be displaced and captured.

The step movers are the king, prince, drunk elephant, blind tigers, ferocious leopards, the generals, go-betweens, and the 12 pawns of each side. Only the king and prince can move in all eight directions. The king and prince are additionally considered royal pieces, as losing both of them loses the game. The Japanese Chu Shogi Association, in addition to separating out the king and prince, also considers the pawns and go-betweens as a separate class of 'pawns' (歩), while the remaining step movers are called 'small pieces' (小駒).

==== Jumping pieces ====
Several pieces can jump, that is, they can pass over any intervening piece, whether friend or foe, with no effect on either. These are the lion, the kirin, the phoenix, the horned falcon and the soaring eagle. Only the lion can jump in all directions.

==== Ranging pieces ====
Many pieces can move any number of empty squares along a straight orthogonal or diagonal line, limited only by the edge of the board. If an opposing piece intervenes, it may be captured by moving to that square and removing it from the board. A ranging piece must stop where it captures, and cannot bypass a piece that is in its way. If a friendly piece intervenes, the moving piece is limited to a distance that stops short of the intervening piece; if the friendly piece is adjacent, it cannot move in that direction at all.

The ranging pieces are the queen, dragon king, dragon horse, rook, bishop, vertical mover, side mover, reverse chariot, lance, and all those pieces which do not appear in the initial setup except the prince. Only the queen can range along all eight directions. The Japanese Chu Shogi Association further divides them into greater (大走り駒) and lesser (走り駒) ranging pieces: the greater ranging pieces are the queen, horned falcon, and soaring eagle, and the remainder are lesser ranging pieces.

==== Lion move (multiple capture) ====
The lion has a double-capture ability, called a 'lion move', as to a lesser extent do the soaring eagle and horned falcon (promoted dragon king and dragon horse). The details of these powerful moves are described for the lion below.

==== Individual pieces ====
Following are diagrams that indicate the movement of each piece. Pieces are listed roughly in order, from front to back rows, with pieces making similar moves paired. Pieces with a grey heading start out in the game; those with a blue heading only appear on the board as a promoted piece. Betza's funny notation has been included in brackets for easier reference, with the extension that the notation xxxayyyK stands for an xxxK move possibly followed by an yyyK move, not necessarily in the same direction. By default continuation legs can go into all directions, but can be restricted to a single line by a modifier 'v' ("vertical", interpreted relative to the piece's current position on its path). The default modality of all legs is the ability to move and capture: other possibilities are specified explicitly. Square brackets are used to make it clear what operators the a modifier chains together: thus DaK would denote a dabbaba move followed by a king move, but D[aK] would denote a piece that can move as a dabbaba, or twice as a king. Use [crM] for the expression that could be reached and returned by moving as M.

Notation
○	Steps to an adjacent square
☆	Jumps to a non-adjacent square, bypassing any intervening piece
│	Ranges along a straight line, crossing any number of empty squares
─	Ranges along a straight line, crossing any number of empty squares
╲	Ranges along a straight line, crossing any number of empty squares
╱	Ranges along a straight line, crossing any number of empty squares
!	igui (capture without moving)

Go-Between 仲人 chūnin (promotes to drunk elephant)		Pawn 歩兵 fuhyō (promotes to gold general)	
○; 仲; ○	Step; The go-between steps one square directly forward or backward. (fbW)	○; 歩	Step; The pawn can only step one square directly forward. Upon reaching the furthest rank of the board, it is trapped unless it promotes. (fW)
Side Mover 横行 ōgyō (promotes to free boar)		Vertical Mover 竪行 shugyō (promotes to flying ox)	
/ / ○; ─ / ─ / 横 / ─ / ─; / / ○	Range; The side mover can move any number of free squares orthogonally sideways; or, Step; It can step one square directly forward or backward. (WrlR)	/ │; / │; ○ / 竪 / ○; / │; / │	Range; The vertical mover can move any number of free squares orthogonally, either forward or backward; or, Step; It can take one step directly sideways. (WfbR)
Bishop 角行 kakugyō (promotes to dragon horse)		Rook 飛車 hisha (promotes to dragon king)	
╲ / / / / ╱; / ╲ / / ╱; / / 角; / ╱ / / ╲; ╱ / / / / ╲	Range; The bishop can move any number of free squares along any one of the four diagonals. (B) Because it cannot move orthogonally, an unpromoted bishop can only reach half the squares on the board.	/ / │; / / │; ─ / ─ / 飛 / ─ / ─; / / │; / / │	Range; The rook can move any number of free squares along any one of the four orthogonals. (R)
Dragon Horse 龍馬 ryūma (promotes to horned falcon)		Dragon King 龍王 ryūō (promotes to soaring eagle)	
╲ / / / / ╱; / ╲ / ○ / ╱; / ○ / 馬 / ○; / ╱ / ○ / ╲; ╱ / / / / ╲	Range; The dragon horse can move any number of free squares along any one of the four diagonals; or, Step; It can take one step in any direction. (WB)	/ / │; / ○ / │ / ○; ─ / ─ / 龍 / ─ / ─; / ○ / │ / ○; / / │	Range; The dragon king can move any number of free squares along any one of the four orthogonals; or, Step; It can take one step in any direction. (FR)
Lance 香車 kyōsha (promotes to white horse)		Reverse Chariot 反車 hensha (promotes to whale)	
│; │; 香	Range; The lance can move any number of free squares directly forward. It cannot return and is trapped upon reaching the farthest row unless it promotes. (fR)	│; │; 反; │; │	Ranging; The reverse chariot can move any number of free squares directly forward or backward. (fbR)
Blind Tiger 盲虎 mōko (promotes to flying stag)		Ferocious Leopard 猛豹 mōhyō (promotes to bishop)	
○ / / ○; ○ / 虎 / ○; ○ / ○ / ○	Step; The blind tiger can take one step in any direction except directly forward. (FrlbW)	○ / ○ / ○; / 豹; ○ / ○ / ○	Step; The ferocious leopard can take one step to any of the three squares ahead or three squares behind it, but not directly to either side. (FfbW)
Copper General 銅将 dōshō (promotes to side mover)		Silver General 銀将 ginshō (promotes to vertical mover)	
○ / ○ / ○; / 銅; / ○	Step; The copper general can take one step to any of the three squares ahead of it, or else directly backward, giving it four possibilities. (fKbW)	○ / ○ / ○; / 銀; ○ / / ○	Step; The silver general can take one step diagonally, or else directly forward, giving it five possibilities. (FfW)
Gold General 金将 kinshō (promotes to rook)		Drunk Elephant 酔象 suizō (promotes to prince)	
○ / ○ / ○; ○ / 金 / ○; / ○	Step; The gold general can take one step orthogonally, or else one step diagonally forward, giving it six possibilities. (WfF)	○ / ○ / ○; ○ / 象 / ○; ○ / / ○	The drunk elephant can take one step in any direction except directly backward. (FfrlW)
Kirin 麒麟 kirin (promotes to lion)		Phoenix 鳳凰 hōō (promotes to queen)	
/ / ☆; / ○ / / ○; ☆ / / 麒 / / ☆; / ○ / / ○; / / ☆	Jump; The kirin can jump to the second square in one of the four orthogonal directions. Or, Step; It can take one step diagonally. (FD) Because of its unusual movement, an unpromoted kirin can only reach half the squares on the board.	☆ / / / / ☆; / / ○; / ○ / 鳳 / ○; / / ○; ☆ / / / / ☆	Jump; The phoenix can jump to the second square in one of the four diagonal directions. Or, Step; It can take one step orthogonally. (WA)
Queen 奔王 honnō		Flying Stag 飛鹿 hiroku (promoted blind tiger)	
╲ / / │ / / ╱; / ╲ / │ / ╱; ─ / ─ / 奔 / ─ / ─; / ╱ / │ / ╲; ╱ / / │ / / ╲	Range; The queen can move any number of free squares in any of the eight orthogonal or diagonal directions. (Q)	/ │; ○ / │ / ○; ○ / 鹿 / ○; ○ / │ / ○; / │	Range; The flying stag can move any number of free squares directly forward or backward; or, Step; It can take one step in any direction. (fbRK)
Flying Ox 飛牛 higyū (promoted vertical mover)		Free Boar 奔猪 honcho (promoted side mover)	
╲ / / │ / / ╱; / ╲ / │ / ╱; / / 牛; / ╱ / │ / ╲; ╱ / / │ / / ╲	Range; The flying ox can move any number of free squares forwards, backwards, or diagonally, but not directly to the side. (fbRB)	╲ / / / / ╱; / ╲ / / ╱; ─ / ─ / 猪 / ─ / ─; / ╱ / / ╲; ╱ / / / / ╲	Range; The free boar can move any number of free squares diagonally or to the side, but not directly forward or backward. (rlRB)
Whale 鯨鯢 keigei (promoted reverse chariot)		White Horse 白駒 hakku (promoted lance)	
/ / │; / / │; / / 鯨; / ╱ / │ / ╲; ╱ / / │ / / ╲	Range; The whale can move any number of free squares directly forwards, backwards, or along either rear diagonal. (fRbQ)	╲ / / │ / / ╱; / ╲ / │ / ╱; / / 駒; / / │; / / │	Range; The white horse can move any number of free squares directly backwards, forwards, or along either forward diagonal. (fQbR)
King 玉将 gyokushō, 王将 ōshō		Prince 太子 taishi (promoted drunk elephant)	
○ / ○ / ○; ○ / 王 / ○; ○ / ○ / ○	Step; The king can take one step in any direction. (K)	○ / ○ / ○; ○ / 太 / ○; ○ / ○ / ○	Step; The prince can take one step in any direction, like a king. (K) If a prince is in play, it must be captured along with the king.

The next three pieces have special movements that involve the ability to move and even capture twice per turn.

Horned Falcon 角鷹 kakuō (promoted dragon horse)		Soaring Eagle 飛鷲 hijū (promoted dragon king)	
╲ / / ☆ / / ╱; / ╲ / ! / ╱; ─ / ─ / 鷹 / ─ / ─; / ╱ / │ / ╲; ╱ / / │ / / ╲	Range; The horned falcon can move any number of free squares along a straight line in any direction except directly forwards.: Lion move; It can step or jump up to two squares along a line directly forward, potentially capturing two pieces. This power includes igui and skipping a turn (see "Lion"), but not moving off the orthogonal. Similarly to the lion, the horned falcon cannot skip a turn if the adjacent square directly in front is occupied, or falls off the edge of the board.(BrlbR[crfW]fD)	☆ / / │ / / ☆; / ! / │ / !; ─ / ─ / 鷲 / ─ / ─; / ╱ / │ / ╲; ╱ / / │ / / ╲	Range; The soaring eagle can move any number of free squares along a straight line in any direction except the forward diagonals.: Lion move; It can step or jump up to two squares along either forward diagonal, potentially capturing two pieces. This power includes igui and skipping a turn (see "Lion"), but not moving off the diagonal. Similarly to the lion, the soaring eagle cannot skip a turn if both of the adjacent squares on the forward diagonals are occupied, or fall off the edge of the board. (RbB[crfF]fA)
Lion 獅子 shishi
○ × 2: ○ / ○ / ○ / ○ / ○; ○ / ○ / ○ / ○ / ○; ○ / ○ / 獅 / ○ / ○; ○ / ○ / ○ / ○ / ○; ○ / ○ / ○ / ○ / ○; ☆ / ☆ / ☆ / ☆ / ☆; ☆ / ! / ! / ! / ☆; ☆ / ! / 獅 / ! / ☆; ☆ / ! / ! / ! / ☆; ☆ / ☆ / ☆ / ☆ / ☆	Area move/double capture; The lion can take a step in any direction up to twice per turn. It can continue after a capture on the first step, potentially capturing two pieces per turn. It can change directions after the first step, so that it can reach the squares that a knight jumps to in Western chess. By returning to its starting square with the second step, it can effectively capture a piece on an adjacent square without moving. This is called 居喰い igui 'stationary feeding'. It can step to an adjacent empty square and back without capturing anything; this leaves the board unchanged, effectively passing a turn (じっと jitto). Jitto may prove useful in endgame situations; it is traditionally indicated by tapping the lion and leaving it in place.: Jump; The lion can jump anywhere that it could step to on an empty board; that is, anywhere within a distance of two squares, except for the square it started on. (Hence jitto is only possible if at least one adjacent square is empty.) This is equivalent to jumping in any of the eight diagonal or orthogonal directions, or making any of the jumps of a knight in Western chess. (NAD[aK]): Immunity from capture; Capture of a lion is forbidden in situations where this would in general just trade two lions out of the game: 1. A lion cannot capture a non-adjacent other lion (i.e. on a "☆" square) when it could then be recaptured on the next move, unless it captures something substantial (i.e. other than pawn or go-between) together with the lion in a double capture. (Such a double capture is called 付け喰い tsukegui or 喰添 kuisoe "additional eating", and recapturing that lion is called 獅子を撃つ shishi o utsu 'shooting the lion'.); 2. A non-lion cannot capture a lion when in the immediately preceding move a lion was captured by a non-lion on another square. This also applies to "hit-and-run" captures by a soaring eagle or horned falcon. (In recent times this has been amended by the Okazaki rule, that such a counter-strike is allowed against a lion that is unprotected.) The stipulation "another square" means that if a kirin captures a lion, it can always be recaptured even if it had simultaneously promoted to lion.; Historic rule descriptions explicitly discuss a case where recapture slides over the square evacuated by the capturing lion (たはかげ足 'hidden protector'; the equivalent situation in Western chess is called an X-ray attack). But they do not mention cases where a pawn or go-between taken together with a lion in a double capture affect the possibility to recapture, making it controversial whether the latter could be exceptions to the stated rule (1). Furthermore, it is generally assumed that the lion-capture rules do not apply recursively in case of multiple lions, so that hypothetical recaptures ruling out a capture would not have to obey those, just like they also would not have to keep their king out of check. Note that there is no difference between promoted kirins and lions as far as these rules are concerned.		

===== Lion moves =====
Below are eight examples of the lion-trading rules in action. In all examples below, the Black and White pieces are distinguished by colour, rather than their direction as they would be in a real game. (Black moves up the board.)

/ / 金; / 獅; 獅; I. Black can play LnxLn, as the two lions are adjacent, and so the protection by White's gold general is irrelevant. Note the Black lion is allowed to end up anywhere in the drawn area after the capture, even on the 3 squares where the gold could recapture it, although usually it would of course avoid that, and perhaps even take the gold as well.	角 / / 香; 銀; / 獅; / / 獅; II. Both Black's and White's lions are protected (Black's by a silver general and White's by a lance), and hence neither side can play LnxLn. However, Black can legally play BxLn.
獅; / 獅; / 歩; / / 角; III. Black cannot play LnxLn, as while White's lion is currently undefended, the capture would expose Black's lion to recapture by White's bishop via an X-ray attack. White's bishop is thus a hidden protector. White to move could play BxLn legally, but not LnxLn.	/ 獅 / / 馬; / 銀 / 歩; / / / 獅; / / / 歩; 玉 / / / / 角; IV. A more complicated version of the previous situation. Black cannot play LnxPxLn, as this leaves the lion open to recapture by the White bishop and the intermediate piece was a pawn. (The same would be true if it were a White go-between.) However, Black could legally forego capturing the pawn and only capture the White lion, as that does not allow for immediate recapture. (This is the probable rule, although it is not explicitly stated in historical documents. It would be extremely rare anyway that one would prefer exposure to recapture, even if that were allowed. But in this example the discovered check would have made it safe to do so.)
/ 獅; 歩; 獅; V. White's lion is protected by a pawn, and hence it would be illegal for Black to use their lion to capture White's lion and nothing else (since Black's lion could then be recaptured by the pawn). The status of capturing both the pawn and the lion is controversial; this situation is not addressed by the historical sources. According to the Japanese Chu Shogi Association, the double-capture is not legal because the White lion is protected before the move. However, according to The Chess Variant Pages, the double-capture is legal as the Black lion could not be recaptured after the move.	/ / 獅 / / 飛; 金 / 仲; / / 獅; / / / 銀; / / / / 獅; VI. Black cannot capture the White lion in the corner alone, as the White rook could recapture; however, capturing the silver general and then the corner lion is legal. Black cannot capture the White lion at the top of the board (also protected by the rook), even if the go-between is captured along the way. (Both interpretations discussed in situation V agree here, because the lion could be recaptured after the move.) It is legal for Black to capture the White go-between and then the White gold general, as then this is not a lion-capturing-lion situation and the rules do not apply.
飛; / 麒 / / 獅; 獅; / / 角; VII. If White plays RxLn, then by the Edo-era rules, Black cannot retaliate immediately with BxLn. It would become possible to retaliate on any future move. Under the Japanese Chu Shogi Association's rules, the recapture would be allowed by the Okazaki rule as White's lion is unprotected. If White captures Black's lion with the kirin and promotes it to lion, Black would be allowed to recapture that lion in the next move, as this is not on another square from where the first lion was captured. (As the net effect is a trade of kirin for lion rather than lion for lion.)	香; 角 / / / / 獅; / / 獅; / 獅; / / 飛; / / / 王; VIII. A case with multiple lions. (Such situations do not appear in the historical rules.) Suppose the Black lion captures White's leftmost lion (1.LnxLn). White objects, suggesting 1...LnxLn as a possible recapture. Now, this proposed White move would not be legal under the lion-trading rules, as it exposes White's lion to immediate recapture by Black's rook (2.RxLn). (The pin on the rook is irrelevant, as it is legal, though usually bad, to expose one's king to check in chu shogi.) Since White's proposed recapture 1...LnxLn is illegal, the Black lion cannot actually be recaptured after 1.LnxLn. However, contemporary play would not take this into account. Instead, it would tend to favour a front-to-back application of the rules, in which any exposure of a lion to recapture is considered illegal and loses on the spot. Under this interpretation, Black's 1.LnxLn is illegal.

=== Repetition ===
In principle a player may not make a move if the resulting position is one that has previously occurred in the game with the same player to move. (This rule is usually relaxed without altering its effect, by only forbidding the 4th occurrence of any position, to allow for human error.) However, evidence from historical mating problems suggests that this prohibition does not apply to a player who is in check.

Note that certain pieces have the ability to pass in certain situations (a lion, when at least one square immediately adjacent to it is unoccupied, a horned falcon, when the square immediately in front of it is unoccupied, and a soaring eagle, when one or both of the two squares immediately diagonally in front of it are unoccupied). (The lion, horned falcon, and soaring eagle can also be blocked from passing by the edge of the board.) Such a pass move leaves the position unchanged, but it does not violate the repetition rule, as it will now be the turn of the other player to move. Of course, two consecutive passes are not possible, as the first player will see the same position as before.

The Japanese Chu Shogi Association plays by more complex repetition rules. Only a fourth repetition is forbidden, and the burden to deviate is not necessarily on the player that reaches this first. If one side is making attacks on other pieces (however futile) with his moves in the repeat cycle, and the other is not, the attacking side must deviate, while in case of checking the checker must deviate regardless of whether the checked side attacks other pieces. In the case of consecutive passes, the side passing first must deviate, making turn passing to avoid zugzwang pointless if the opponent is in a position where they can pass their turn too. If none of these are applicable, repetition is a draw.

=== Check and mate ===
When a player makes a move such that the opponent's only remaining royal (king or prince) could be captured on the following move, the move is said to give check; the king or prince is said to be in check. If a player's king or prince is in check and no legal move by that player will get it out of check, the checking move is also mate, and effectively wins the game.

Unlike Western chess, a player need not move out of check in chu shogi, and indeed may even move into check. Although obviously not often a good idea, a player with more than one royal may occasionally sacrifice one of these pieces as part of a gambit, or trade it for more capable pieces.

A player is not allowed to give perpetual check. This is not a rule in itself, but arises from the repetition rule.

=== Game end ===
A player who captures the opponent's sole remaining king or prince wins the game. Thus a player who is checkmated or stalemated will lose. The very artificial situation of a smothered stalemate, where no moves are possible (even those that would expose the king), is not covered in the historical sources. The Chess Variant Pages rule this as a loss for the stalemated player, for definiteness.

As an alternative, there is the "bare king" rule. A historic description of chu shogi mentions, "When pieces are gone, and there are only the 2 kings, one can mate only if he has a promoted gold". Nonetheless, this is only one specific case, and the motivation for such a rule is uncertain given that king and rook (a promoted gold) against king is an easy forced checkmate. The Japanese Chu-Shogi Association has altered this into a general baring rule similar to that of shatranj, where a bare king immediately loses against any other material, unless the player can bare the opponent on the following move (in which case the game is a draw), or the player can capture the opponent's sole remaining king or prince on the following move (in which case the opponent loses). This makes a difference in the endgames of king and pawn against king, or king and ferocious leopard against king, which cannot be won by the stronger side without the bare king rule (and also in some cases with blind tigers, silver generals, and copper generals that can be trapped by the enemy king when separated from their own kings). Further detail is offered in their standardised rules: king and any piece against king is an immediate win by the bare king rule, except if the piece is a pawn or go-between, in which case it must be promoted safely (to a gold general or drunk elephant respectively) before the win can be claimed. Furthermore, "dead pieces" do not count under this rule; a king and an immobile pawn or lance at the far rank against a king is still a draw.

In practice these winning conditions are rarely fulfilled, as a player will resign when checkmated, as otherwise when loss is inevitable.

A player who makes an illegal move loses immediately. (This rule may be relaxed in casual games, and Hodges writing for a Western audience encourages players to do so.) Players can also agree to a draw at any time, or if the game reaches a position such that the winning condition is impossible to fulfill for either player (called 持将棋 jishōgi, as in standard shogi). (In practice, positions that cannot be won without the other side making a very obvious blunder are also considered as jishōgi, such as a king with only his lion blocked from getting near the enemy king by two side movers on adjacent ranks.) Under the historical rules, this means that no legal series of moves can lead to all of one player's royal pieces being captured; under the Japanese Chu Shogi Association's rules, this additionally means that no legal series of moves can lead to one player being left with only a king, or with no royal pieces. In professional play, drawn games are replayed with opposite colours.

=== Touch rule ===
Hodges reports a strict touch rule for chu shogi. Once a piece has been touched, it must be moved. Furthermore, if the piece is also moved to a square, it must remain on that square without exception. (That is, the piece cannot be moved to a different square, even if one's hand does not leave the piece.) Under the rules of the Japanese Chu Shogi Association, if a piece is touched but it cannot move, there is no penalty for the first two times, but the opponent can declare a foul on the third time, resulting in forfeiture of the game. Thus, chu shogi's touch rule is stricter than the western chess touch-move rule used in tournament play.

== Handicaps ==
Games between players of disparate strengths are often played with handicaps. In a handicap game, one or more of White's pieces are removed from the setup—in exchange, White may move up a few of their pieces or rearrange them to fill in the gaps and protect the weaker pieces, and White plays first. Lions can also be handicapped by having Black's kirin promoted for a second lion, and, for a third, swapping Black's phoenix for White's kirin and promoting the latter.

The imbalance created by this method of handicapping is not as strong as it is in international chess because material advantage is not as powerful in chu shogi as it is in chess.

Most of the handicaps detailed in the Middle Shogi Manual, in increasing order of size, are as follows:

- Copper General
- Silver General
- Blind Tiger
- Ferocious Leopard
- Gold General
- Side Mover
- Vertical Mover
- Rook
- Two Lions
- Two Lions and a Copper General
- Two Lions and a Silver General
- Two Lions and a Ferocious Leopard
- Two Lions and a Gold General
- Two Lions and a Side Mover
- Two Lions and a Vertical Mover
- Three Lions
- Three Lions and One Piece: Three Lions and a Queen
- Three Lions and Two Pieces: Three Lions, a Queen and a Dragon King
- Three Lions and Three Pieces: Three Lions, a Queen, a Dragon King and a Rook
- Three Lions and Four Pieces: Three Lions, a Queen, a Dragon King, a Rook and a Vertical Mover
- Three Lions and Five Pieces: Three Lions, a Queen, a Dragon King, a Rook, a Vertical Mover and a Side Mover

There are two other handicaps detailed in the Manual, of unknown exact size: one is Queen (probably slightly weaker than Two Lions); the other is Queen and Dragon King. Other handicaps may be used, such as Two Kings (where the weaker player begins with the Drunk Elephant promoted).

The relationship between handicaps and differences in rank is not universally agreed upon. Colin Adams' suggestion is as follows:

Grade difference	Handicap
0	Alternating Black and White (no handicap)
1	Black (the weaker player moves first)
2	Gold General (the stronger player removes a gold general, or any of the other four step movers)
3	Side Mover
4	Vertical Mover
5	Alternating Rook and Queen
6	Two Lions
7	Two Lions and a Step Mover (copper general, silver general, ferocious leopard, or gold general)
8	Two Lions and a Side Mover
9	Two Lions and a Vertical Mover
10	Alternating Two Lions and a Vertical Mover and Three Lions
11	Three Lions
12	Alternating Three Lions and Three Lions and One Piece
13	Three Lions and One Piece
14	Three Lions and Two Pieces
15	Three Lions and Three Pieces
16	Three Lions and Four Pieces
17	Three Lions and Five Pieces

He also once suggested a grading system going downward from 20 kyū (beginner) to 1 kyū, and then upward from 1 dan to 9 dan. (That suggestion was from about 2000.)

== Game notation ==
The method used in English-language texts to express shogi moves was established by George Hodges in 1976 ('TSA notation') in the magazine Shogi. It is derived from the algebraic notation used for chess, but modifications have been made for chu shogi.

A typical example is P-8f. The first one or two letters represents the piece moved (see setup above, except that Ky "kylin" is used for Kirin and FK "free king" for Queen). Promoted pieces have a + added in front of the letter, for example +P for a promoted pawn. The designation of the piece is followed by a symbol indicating the type of move: - for an ordinary move or x for a capture. Next is the designation for the square on which the piece lands. This consists of a number representing the file and a lowercase letter representing the rank, with 1a being the top right corner (as seen from Black's point of view) and 12l being the bottom left corner. (This method of designating squares is based on Japanese convention, which, however, uses Japanese numerals instead of letters. For example, the square 2c is denoted by 2三 in Japanese.)

If a move entitles the player to promote the piece, then a + is added to the end to signify that the promotion was taken, or an = to indicate that it was declined. For example, Px7d= indicates a pawn capturing on 7d without promoting.

In cases where the above notation would be ambiguous, the designation of the start square is added after the designation for the piece in order to make clear which piece is meant.

When a 'Lion', 'Horned Falcon' or 'Soaring Eagle' captures by igui (that is, without moving), the square of the piece being captured is used instead of the destination square, and this is preceded by the symbol '!'. For example, a Lion on 8c capturing a piece on 9d by igui would be shown as Lnx!9d.

When a piece makes a double capture with 'Lion' powers both captures are shown in the order that they were made. For example, a Lion on 3g, capturing a piece on 3h and then capturing another on 2i, would be represented by Lnx3hx2i.

Moves are commonly numbered as in chess.

WinBoard/XBoard uses non-easternised algebraic notation for the moves, differing mainly from TSA notation by using single-letter piece abbreviations, labeling the board files with the letters a–l from left to right, the board ranks with the numbers 1–12 from bottom to top, and omitting the hyphen separator between piece name and square coordinates. It reverses the names "Black" and "White" to conform to international chess. Thus it becomes White who moves first, and his king starts at f1; the Black king starts at g12. (In the TSA notation, these squares are 7l and 6a respectively.) Double moves are indicated by the same method as in TSA notation (e.g. +Dxf6-g7). Igui, however, has no special notation but is written as the back-and-forth double move it is, while a turn pass is written as -- and not associated with a particular piece. Absence of a promotion + suffix implies deferral. Some WinBoard versions use a more general notation for double moves, writing all legs as individual SAN moves, separating them by commas.

== Variations ==
Initial placement of Chu shogi pieces

Position: A12 black incense chariot, B12 black ferocious leopard, C12 black copper general, D12 black silver general, E12 black golden general, F12 black king general, G12 black drunk elephant, H12 black golden general, I12 black silver general, J12 black copper general, K12 black ferocious leopard, L12 black incense chariot, A11 black reverse chariot, C11 black angle mover, E11 black blind tiger, F11 black kirin, G11 black phoenix, H11 black blind tiger, J11 black angle mover, L11 black reverse chariot, A10 black side mover, B10 black vertical mover, C10 black flying chariot, D10 black dragon horse, E10 black dragon king, F10 black lion, G10 black free king, H10 black dragon king, I10 black dragon horse, J10 black flying chariot, K10 black vertical mover, L10 black side mover, A9 black foot soldier, B9 black foot soldier, C9 black foot soldier, D9 black foot soldier, E9 black foot soldier, F9 black foot soldier, G9 black foot soldier, H9 black foot soldier, I9 black foot soldier, J9 black foot soldier, K9 black foot soldier, L9 black foot soldier, D8 black go-between, I8 black go-between, D5 white go-between, I5 white go-between, A4 white foot soldier, B4 white foot soldier, C4 white foot soldier, D4 white foot soldier, E4 white foot soldier, F4 white foot soldier, G4 white foot soldier, H4 white foot soldier, I4 white foot soldier, J4 white foot soldier, K4 white foot soldier, L4 white foot soldier, A3 white side mover, B3 white vertical mover, C3 white flying chariot, D3 white dragon horse, E3 white dragon king, F3 white lion, G3 white free king, H3 white dragon king, I3 white dragon horse, J3 white flying chariot, K3 white vertical mover, L3 white side mover, A2 white reverse chariot, C2 white angle mover, E2 white blind tiger, F2 white kirin, G2 white phoenix, H2 white blind tiger, J2 white angle mover, L2 white reverse chariot, A1 white incense chariot, B1 white ferocious leopard, C1 white copper general, D1 white silver general, E1 white golden general, F1 white king general, G1 white drunk elephant, H1 white golden general, I1 white silver general, J1 white copper general, K1 white ferocious leopard, L1 white incense chariot

Heisei chu shogi setup
12	11	10	9	8	7	6	5	4	3	2	1
	FL			G	DE	K	G			FL		a
		B		BT			BT		B			b
		R	DH	DK	Q	Ln	DK	DH	R			c
P	P	P	P	P	P	P	P	P	P	P	P	d
			GB					GB				e
												f
												g
			GB					GB				h
P	P	P	P	P	P	P	P	P	P	P	P	i
		R	DH	DK	Ln	Q	DK	DH	R			j
		B		BT			BT		B			k
	FL			G	K	DE	G			FL		l

One modern variant of chu shogi, called Heisei chu shogi (平成中将棋), is played on a more open board. Forty percent of the pieces are set aside at setup and held in reserve, and at any point during the game a player may drop one of these on an empty square adjacent to a friendly piece. Captured pieces do not come back into play, and the rest of the game is played as in regular chu shogi.

The set-aside pieces are the lances, coppers, silvers, side movers, vertical movers, reverse chariots, kirin, and phoenix. As with dropped pieces in standard shogi, the piece may not be dropped on a square from where it cannot move (e.g. a lance in the far rank). If dropped into the promotion zone, the piece may promote immediately or on any subsequent move in the promotion zone.

== Strategy ==
=== Opening ===
The valuable long-range sliders have to be shielded from attack by the enemy's much less-valuable steppers by operating from behind one's own steppers, or they would get quickly lost through fork attacks. As the steppers start on the back rank, they need to be developed before one can engage the opponent. This is usually done by pushing the Pawns one rank forward, creating a passage through the 3rd rank by moving up some of the sliders there, and walk Copper, Silver and Leopard to the 4th rank and beyond through the resulting corridor. One of the Side Movers is usually moved up to 4th rank, so that when a player's own camp empties as a result of launching an attack, the Side Movers prevent entry of the enemy Lion by controlling 3rd and 4th rank.

=== King castle ===
	盲	象	盲
金		王		金

The King is usually protected by hiding it behind a wall on the 2nd rank built from the two Tigers and the Elephant. When standing shoulder to shoulder these pieces protect each other's blind spots, making the defense hold up against a lone Lion. An even stronger castle results from leaving the Golds diagonally protecting the outer-most pieces of the wall, although this has the obvious disadvantage that these Golds then cannot be used for attacking, or protecting the wings of a player's camp from infestation by enemy promoting pieces. There is no hurry in building the castle, as it will take a long time before the opponent can fight their way through all the material that is initially in front of a player's King.

=== Edges ===
As the left and right board edges are controlled by the battery formed by the Lance and the Chariot, usually little can be achieved here before the player acquires a material advantage by capturing some of the opponent's pieces there from the sides. However, even if an opponent's edge is completely annihilated, it will take an impractically long time before the player can exploit that by promoting the Lance and the Chariot so they can get involved in a meaningful manner, as the Player must first move the pawn blocking the promotion. Hence, the edges are only used as a tie breaker in the case where the battle for the centre ends undecided.

=== Piece values ===
According to the German Chu Shogi Association, the average values of the pieces are:

Average piece values
Piece name	Approximate value	Promotion	Approximate value
Lion	20	—	—
Queen	12	—	—
Dragon King	8	Soaring Eagle	11
Dragon Horse	7	Horned Falcon	10
Rook	6	Dragon King	8
Bishop	5	Dragon Horse	7
Vertical Mover	4	Flying Ox	8
Side Mover	4	Free Boar	8
King	4	—	—
Phoenix	3	Queen	12
Kirin	3	Lion	20
Reverse Chariot	3	Whale	5
Lance	3	White Horse	7
Drunk Elephant	3	Prince	4
Gold General	3	Rook	6
Ferocious Leopard	3	Bishop	5
Blind Tiger	3	Flying Stag	6
Silver General	2	Vertical Mover	4
Copper General	2	Side Mover	4
Go-between	1	Drunk Elephant	3
Pawn	1	Gold General	3

These average values do not take into account the special status of the king and prince as royal pieces. They have also been normalized so that the pawn is worth 1 point to avoid fractions. Additionally, pieces gain in value if they have a good chance of promotion (particularly for the kirin, which promotes to the most powerful piece in the game).

Wayne Schmittberger adopts a different point of view, claiming that no such point values can be assigned, because most pieces can promote. Instead, he sorts the pieces, while grouping them by approximate value:

1. lion
2. queen, (soaring eagle), (horned falcon), dragon king, dragon horse
3. (flying ox), (free boar)
4. (dragon king), rook, phoenix*
5. (dragon horse), bishop, vertical mover, (rook)
6. kirin*, side mover
7. (white horse), (whale), (crown prince)**
8. reverse chariot, lance
9. (flying stag)
10. gold, drunk elephant*
11. (bishop)
12. (vertical mover), (side mover)
13. ferocious leopard, blind tiger, silver
14. (drunk elephant), (tokin), copper
15. go-between, pawn

*Value varies greatly according to how close it is to promotion

**But if the player has lost his or her king, the crown prince is priceless.

() = promoted and cannot promote further; e.g. "(bishop)" = promoted ferocious leopard

=== Promoting ===
Pieces that can slide forward promote far more easily than steppers or jumpers. As the board thins out their promotion becomes unavoidable, while steppers can almost always be met by an opponent stepper to neutralize it by the time it arrives at the promotion zone. The potential promotion gain of the sliders is thus always an important part of the material balance, but if it makes up too large a part of a player's total strength, they might be overwhelmed before they can develop this potential.

Particularly significant are the phoenix and kirin, which promote to the two most powerful pieces in the game. They are best not used up in tactics, but kept until they get an opportunity to survive a promotion.

== See also ==
- Dai shogi
- Tenjiku shogi
- Shogi variant
