= Dabbāba =

Dabbāba (Arabic: دَبَّابَة) may refer to:

- Dabbaba (chess), a fairy chess piece
- Modern Arabic for tank
- Older Arabic for a type of medieval siege engine designed to shelter men who are digging a hole in enemy fortifications (Latin: vinea)
