= Tenjiku shogi =

16×16 variant of Japanese chess

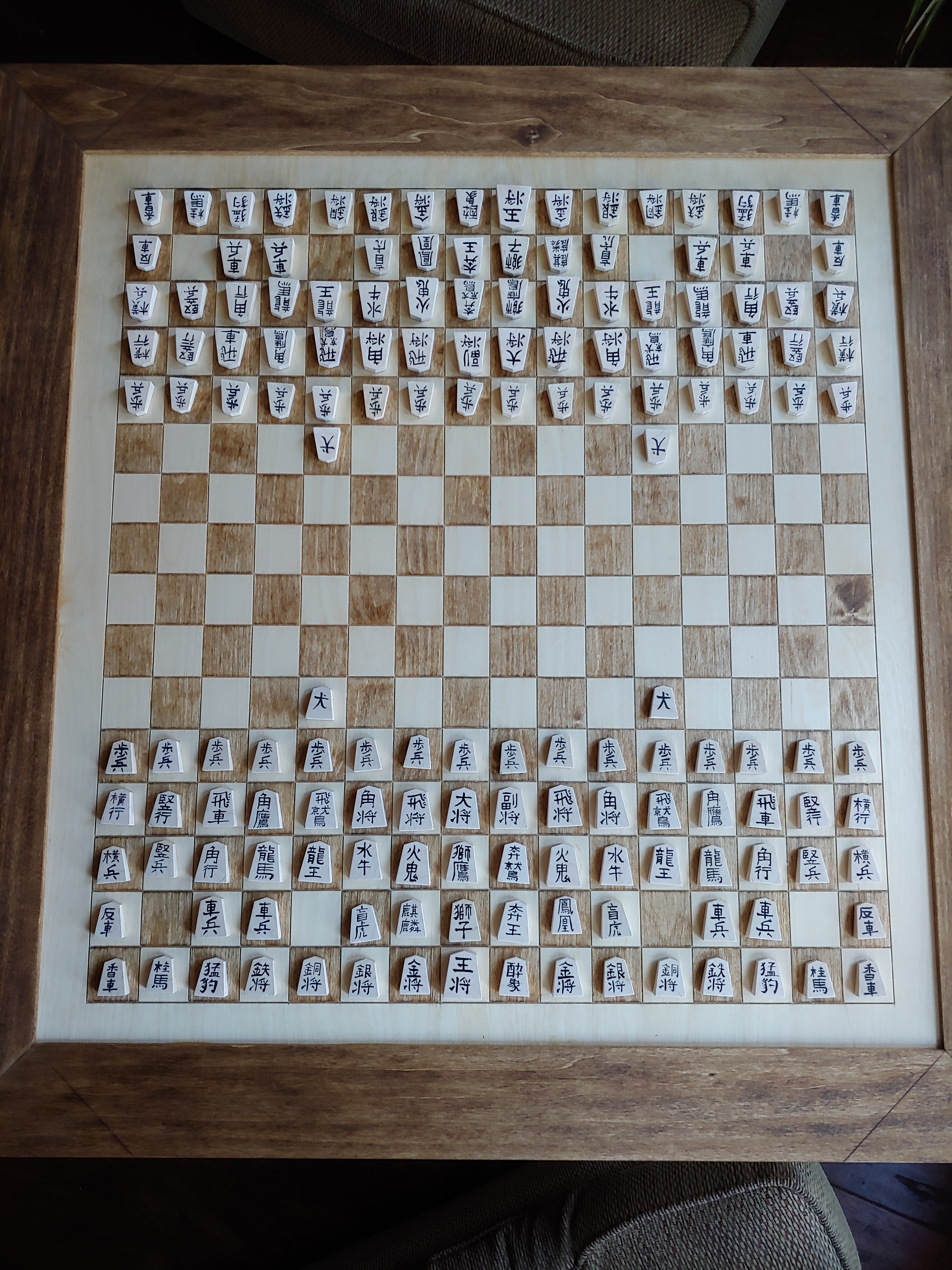
Modernised tenjiku shogi set. Historically, the board would not have been checkered.

Tenjiku shogi (天竺将棋 tenjiku shōgi, "Indian chess" or 天竺大将棋 tenjiku dai shōgi "great Indian chess") is a large-board variant of shogi (Japanese chess). The game dates back to the 15th or 16th century and was based on the earlier chu shogi, which itself was based on dai shogi.

Because of the terse and often incomplete wording of the historical sources for the large shogi variants, except for chu shogi and to a lesser extent dai shogi (which were at some points of time the most prestigious forms of shogi being played), the historical rules of tenjiku shogi are not clear. Different sources often differ significantly in the moves attributed to the pieces. The descriptions listed here are a likely reconstruction based on chu shogi, the primary basis of tenjiku shogi, but not all contemporary players follow these historically-based rules. It is not clear if the game was ever played much historically, as there is no record of sets ever having been made.

== Rules of the game ==
=== Objective ===
The objective of the game is to capture the opponent's king and, if present, the prince, which counts as a second king. Unlike standard shogi, captured pieces may not be dropped back into play by the capturing player.

=== Game equipment ===
Two players, Black and White (or 先手 sente and 後手 gote), play on a board composed of squares in a grid of 16 ranks (rows) by 16 files (columns) with a total of 256 squares. The squares are undifferentiated by marking or color. A pair of dots may be placed just beyond the fifth rank on each side to mark the promotion zones and aid in the initial setup of the two camps.

Each player has a set of 78 wedge-shaped pieces of 36 types. In all, the players must remember 43 moves for these pieces. The pieces are of slightly different sizes. From largest to smallest (roughly most to least powerful) they are:

- 1 King
- 1 Great general
- 1 Vice general
- 2 Rook generals
- 2 Bishop generals
- 1 Free eagle
- 1 Queen
- 2 Soaring eagles
- 2 Horned falcons
- 2 Water buffalos
- 4 Chariot soldiers
- 2 Fire demons
- 1 Lion hawk
- 1 Lion
- 2 Dragon kings
- 2 Dragon horses
- 2 Rooks
- 2 Bishops
- 1 Kirin
- 1 Phoenix
- 1 Drunken elephant
- 2 Blind tigers
- 2 Ferocious leopards
- 2 Gold generals
- 2 Silver generals
- 2 Copper generals
- 2 Vertical movers
- 2 Side movers
- 2 Reverse chariots
- 2 Vertical soldiers
- 2 Side soldiers
- 2 Lances
- 2 Knights
- 2 Iron generals
- 2 Dogs
- 16 Pawns

Several of the English names were chosen to correspond to rough equivalents in Western chess, rather than as translations of the Japanese names. The queen is sometimes referred to as the free king, a direct translation of its Japanese name. The kirin's name is sometimes anglicised as kylin.

Each piece has its name in the form of one or two kanji written on its face. On the reverse side of some pieces are two or three other characters, often in a different color such as red; this reverse side is turned up to indicate that the piece has been promoted during play. The pieces of the two sides do not differ in color, but instead each piece is shaped like a wedge, and faces forward, toward the opposing side. This shows who controls the piece during play.

==== Table of pieces ====
Listed below are the pieces of the game and, if they promote, which pieces they promote to. Pieces marked with an *asterisk are only available with promotion.

Piece	Kanji	Rōmaji	Abbrev.		Promotes to	Betza notation
Bishop	角行	kakugyō	B	角	dragon horse	B
Bishop general	角将	kakushō	BG	用	vice general	BcppB
Blind tiger	盲虎	mōko	BT	虎	flying stag	FrlbW
Chariot soldier	車兵	shahei	CS	車	heavenly tetrarch	BfbRrlR2
Copper general	銅将	dōshō	C	銅	side mover	fKbW
Dog	犬	inu	D	犬	multi general	fWbF
Dragon horse	龍馬	ryūme	DH	馬	horned falcon	WB
Dragon king	龍王	ryūō	DK	龍	soaring eagle	FR
Drunk elephant	酔象	suizō	DE	象	prince	FfrlW
Ferocious leopard	猛豹	mōhyō	FL	豹	bishop	FfbW
Fire demon	火鬼	kaki	FD	火	—	BrlR[mKa3K] + immediate xK
*Flying ox	飛牛	higyū	FO	牛	(promoted vertical mover)	BfbR
*Flying stag	飛鹿	hiroku	FS	鹿	(promoted blind tiger)	fbRK
*Free boar	奔猪	honcho	FB	猪	(promoted side mover)	BrlR
Free eagle	奔鷲	honjū	FE	就	—	QDA[aF]
Gold general	金将	kinshō	G	金	rook	WfF
Great general	大将	taishō	GG	大	—	QcppQ
*Heavenly tetrarch	四天王	shitennō	HT	天	(promoted chariot soldier)	B(≥2)fbR(≥2)rlR(2≤n≤3)cxK
Horned falcon	角鷹	kakuō	HF	鷹	bishop general	BrlbRf[avW]fD
Iron general	鉄将	tesshō	I	鉄	vertical soldier	fK
King (challenging)	玉将	gyokushō	K	玉	—	K
King (reigning)	王将	ōshō	K	王	—	K
Kirin	麒麟	kirin	Kr	麒	lion	FD
Knight	桂馬	keima	N	桂	side soldier	ffN
Lance	香車	kyōsha	L	香	white horse	fR
Lion	獅子	shishi	Ln	獅	lion hawk	NAD[aK]
Lion hawk	獅鷹	shiō	LH	師	—	BNAD[aK]
*Multi general	雜将	suishō	MG	雜	(promoted dog)	fRbB
Pawn	歩兵	fuhyō	P	歩	gold general	fW
Phoenix	鳳凰	hōō	Ph	鳳	queen	WA
*Prince	太子	taishi	CP	子	(promoted drunk elephant)	K
Queen	奔王	honnō	Q	奔	free eagle	Q
Reverse chariot	反車	hensha	RC	反	whale	fbR
Rook	飛車	hisha	R	飛	dragon king	R
Rook general	飛将	hishō	RG	升	great general	RcppR
Side mover	横行	ōgyō	SM	横	free boar	WrlR
Side soldier	横兵	ōhei	SS	黄	water buffalo	WfR2rlR
Silver general	銀将	ginshō	S	銀	vertical mover	FfW
Soaring eagle	飛鷲	hijū	SE	鷲	rook general	RbBf[avF]fA
Vertical mover	竪行	shugyō	VM	竪	flying ox	WfbR
Vertical soldier	竪兵	shuhei	VS	立	chariot soldier	WfRrlR2
Vice general	副将	fukushō	VG	副	—	BcppB[mKa3K]
Water buffalo	水牛	suigyū	WB	水	fire demon	BrlRfbR2
*Whale	鯨鯢	keigei	W	鯨	(promoted reverse chariot)	fRbQ
*White horse	白駒	hakku	WH	駒	(promoted lance)	fQbR

(The queen could also be abbreviated FK for free king, and the kirin as Ky for kylin.)

The promotions can be summarized as series of promotion chains, as follows. Within each block below, a piece (except the kings) promotes to the piece above it. Pieces at the top of each block do not promote (and if in italics, and with an *asterisk, as stated before, these appear only upon promotion). Note that pieces may only promote once. For example, a gold general promotes to a rook, and a rook promotes to a dragon king, but a gold general promoted to a rook cannot promote a second time to a dragon king. This is clear from the equipment, for each piece only has two sides.

Jeweled general	玉将	*Prince	太子
King general	王将	↑ Drunk elephant	↑ 酔象
Vice general	副将	Great general	大将
↑ Bishop general	↑ 角将	↑ Rook general	↑ 飛将
↑ Horned falcon	↑ 角鷹	↑ Soaring eagle	↑ 飛鷲
↑ Dragon horse	↑ 龍馬	↑ Dragon king	↑ 龍王
↑ Bishop	↑ 角行	↑ Rook	↑ 飛車
↑ Ferocious leopard	↑ 猛豹	↑ Gold general	↑ 金将
		↑ Pawn	↑ 歩兵
Fire demon	火鬼	*Heavenly tetrarch	四天王
↑ Water buffalo	↑ 水牛	↑ Chariot soldier	↑ 車兵
↑ Side soldier	↑ 横兵	↑ Vertical soldier	↑ 竪兵
↑ Knight	↑ 桂馬	↑ Iron general	↑ 鉄将
Free eagle	奔鷲	Lion hawk	獅鷹
↑ Queen	↑ 奔王	↑ Lion	↑ 獅子
↑ Phoenix	↑ 鳳凰	↑ Kirin	↑ 麒麟
*Free boar	奔猪	*Flying ox	飛牛
↑ Side mover	↑ 横行	↑ Vertical mover	↑ 竪行
↑ Copper general	↑ 銅将	↑ Silver general	↑ 銀将
*Multi general	雜将	*Flying stag	飛鹿
↑ Dog	↑ 犬	↑ Blind tiger	↑ 盲虎
*White horse	白駒	*Whale	鯨鯢
↑ Lance	↑ 香車	↑ Reverse chariot	↑ 反車

The pieces with a pink background do not appear in chu shogi. Of the chu shogi pieces, only the go-between (which promotes to drunk elephant) does not appear in tenjiku shogi, being replaced by the dog in its function of being a piece in front of the pawn line. The knight and iron general appear in dai shogi, but there they promote to gold general.

=== Setup ===
The initial setup of the board is as follows. See below for a description of the types of moves involved.

Color coding
駒	Range-jumping pieces
駒	Ranging pieces
駒	Multiple-capture pieces
駒	Jumping pieces
駒	Pieces which are restricted to stepping moves
駒	Burning pieces (the fire demons)

Full names

16	15	14	13	12	11	10	9	8	7	6	5	4	3	2	1
香 車	桂 馬	猛 豹	鉄 将	銅 将	銀 将	金 将	酔 象	王 将	金 将	銀 将	銅 将	鉄 将	猛 豹	桂 馬	香 車	一
反 車		車 兵	車 兵		盲 虎	鳳 凰	奔 王	獅 子	麒 麟	盲 虎		車 兵	車 兵		反 車	二
横 兵	竪 兵	角 行	龍 馬	龍 王	水 牛	火 鬼	奔 鷲	獅 鷹	火 鬼	水 牛	龍 王	龍 馬	角 行	竪 兵	横 兵	三
横 行	竪 行	飛 車	角 鷹	飛 鷲	角 将	飛 将	副 将	大 将	飛 将	角 将	飛 鷲	角 鷹	飛 車	竪 行	横 行	四
歩 兵	歩 兵	歩 兵	歩 兵	歩 兵	歩 兵	歩 兵	歩 兵	歩 兵	歩 兵	歩 兵	歩 兵	歩 兵	歩 兵	歩 兵	歩 兵	五
				犬							犬					六
																七
																八
																九
																十
				犬							犬					十 一
歩 兵	歩 兵	歩 兵	歩 兵	歩 兵	歩 兵	歩 兵	歩 兵	歩 兵	歩 兵	歩 兵	歩 兵	歩 兵	歩 兵	歩 兵	歩 兵	十 二
横 行	竪 行	飛 車	角 鷹	飛 鷲	角 将	飛 将	大 将	副 将	飛 将	角 将	飛 鷲	角 鷹	飛 車	竪 行	横 行	十 三
横 兵	竪 兵	角 行	龍 馬	龍 王	水 牛	火 鬼	獅 鷹	奔 鷲	火 鬼	水 牛	龍 王	龍 馬	角 行	竪 兵	横 兵	十 四
反 車		車 兵	車 兵		盲 虎	麒 麟	獅 子	奔 王	鳳 凰	盲 虎		車 兵	車 兵		反 車	十 五
香 車	桂 馬	猛 豹	鉄 将	銅 将	銀 将	金 将	玉 将	酔 象	金 将	銀 将	銅 将	鉄 将	猛 豹	桂 馬	香 車	十 六

Abbreviated names

16	15	14	13	12	11	10	9	8	7	6	5	4	3	2	1
香	桂	豹	鉄	銅	銀	金	象	王	金	銀	銅	鉄	豹	桂	香	一
反		車	車		虎	鳳	奔	獅	麒	虎		車	車		反	二
黄	立	角	馬	龍	水	火	就	師	火	水	龍	馬	角	立	黄	三
横	竪	飛	鷹	鷲	用	升	副	大	升	用	鷲	鷹	飛	竪	横	四
歩	歩	歩	歩	歩	歩	歩	歩	歩	歩	歩	歩	歩	歩	歩	歩	五
				犬							犬					六
																七
																八
																九
																十
				犬							犬					十一
歩	歩	歩	歩	歩	歩	歩	歩	歩	歩	歩	歩	歩	歩	歩	歩	十二
横	竪	飛	鷹	鷲	用	升	大	副	升	用	鷲	鷹	飛	竪	横	十三
黄	立	角	馬	龍	水	火	師	就	火	水	龍	馬	角	立	黄	十四
反		車	車		虎	麒	獅	奔	鳳	虎		車	車		反	十五
香	桂	豹	鉄	銅	銀	金	玉	象	金	銀	銅	鉄	豹	桂	香	十六

Transcribed abbreviations

16	15	14	13	12	11	10	9	8	7	6	5	4	3	2	1
L	N	FL	I	C	S	G	DE	K	G	S	C	I	FL	N	L	a
RC		CS	CS		BT	Ph	Q	Ln	Kr	BT		CS	CS		RC	b
SS	VS	B	DH	DK	WB	FD	FE	LH	FD	WB	DK	DH	B	VS	SS	c
SM	VM	R	HF	SE	BG	RG	VG	GG	RG	BG	SE	HF	R	VM	SM	d
p	p	p	p	p	p	p	p	p	p	p	p	p	p	p	p	e
				D							D					f
																g
																h
																i
																j
				D							D					k
p	p	p	p	p	p	p	p	p	p	p	p	p	p	p	p	l
SM	VM	R	HF	SE	BG	RG	GG	VG	RG	BG	SE	HF	R	VM	SM	m
SS	VS	B	DH	DK	WB	FD	LH	FE	FD	WB	DK	DH	B	VS	SS	n
RC		CS	CS		BT	Kr	Ln	Q	Ph	BT		CS	CS		RC	o
L	N	FL	I	C	S	G	K	DE	G	S	C	I	FL	N	L	p

Legend
B: Bishop	BG: Bishop General	BT: Blind Tiger
C: Copper General	CS: Chariot Soldier	D: Dog
DE: Drunk Elephant	DH: Dragon Horse	DK: Dragon King
FD: Fire Demon	FE: Free Eagle	FL: Ferocious Leopard
G: Gold General	GG: Great General	HF: Horned Falcon
I: Iron General	K: King	Kr: Kirin
L: Lance	LH: Lion Hawk	Ln: Lion
N: Knight	p: Pawn	Ph: Phoenix
Q: Queen	R: Rook	RC: Reverse Chariot
RG: Rook General	S: Silver General	SE: Soaring Eagle
SM: Side Mover	SS: Side Soldier	VG: Vice General
VM: Vertical Mover	VS: Vertical Soldier	WB: Water Buffalo

=== Game play ===
Two players alternate making a move, with Black moving first. (The pieces are not differentiated by color; the traditional chess terms "Black" and "White" are only used to indicate who plays first, and to differentiate the sides during discussions of the game.) A move consists of moving a piece either to an empty square on the board or to a square occupied by an opposing piece, thus capturing that piece; and optionally of promoting the moving piece, if the move enters the promotion zone (that is, it starts outside the promotion zone and ends inside it), or if it is a capture and any part of it is in the promotion zone. Each of these options is detailed below.

Despite the large size of the board and number of pieces, tenjiku shogi games are often quicker than smaller shogi variants because of the higher average power of the pieces. Good use of the fire demons can make for a short game.

=== Movement and capture ===
Tenjiku shogi pieces that occur in chu shogi or dai shogi move as they do in that game, but the pieces from dai shogi promote differently.

An opposing piece is captured by displacement: That is, if a piece moves to a square occupied by an opposing piece, the opposing piece is displaced and removed from the board. A piece cannot move to a square occupied by a friendly piece, that is, by another piece controlled by the moving player. The one exception to this is the unique burn of the fire demon.

Each piece on the game moves in a characteristic pattern. Pieces move either orthogonally (that is, forward, backward, left, or right, in the direction of one of the arms of a plus sign, +), or diagonally (in the direction of one of the arms of a multiplication sign, ×). The vice general, fire demon, lion hawk, lion, and knight are exceptions, in that they do not move, or are not required to move, in a straight line.

Many pieces are capable of several kinds of movement, with the type of movement most often depending on the direction. The movement categories are:

==== Step movers and limited range movers ====
Some pieces are limited to moving one square at a time. If a friendly piece occupies an adjacent square, the moving piece may not move in that direction; if an opposing piece is there, it may be displaced and captured.

The step movers are the king, drunk elephant, blind tiger, ferocious leopard, gold general, silver general, copper general, iron general, dog, and pawn. Other pieces may step in certain directions, but move differently in other directions.

Other pieces have a limited range of two squares along a straight line. The water buffalo, chariot soldier, vertical soldier, and side soldier may move one or two squares in certain directions. They can only move to the second square if the first is unoccupied. They may capture on either square, but must stop where they capture.

==== Area movers ====
The lion, lion hawk, vice general, and fire demon may take multiple (2 to 3) steps in a single turn. These do not have to be in a line, so these pieces can potentially reach every square within two or three steps of the starting square, not just squares along one of the diagonals or orthogonals. Such moves are also useful to get around obstructions. An area mover must stop where it captures.

==== Jumping pieces ====
Some pieces can jump, or in the case of the knight can only jump: They pass over an intervening piece, whether friend or foe, with no effect on either. These are the free eagle, lion hawk, lion, soaring eagle, horned falcon, tetrarch, kirin, phoenix, and knight. These jumps all have a range of two squares: that is, the first square is passed over, and the piece lands (and captures) on the second. The knight jumps between the diagonals and orthogonals, and the lion and lion hawk may do so.

==== Ranging pieces ====
Many pieces can move any number of empty squares along a straight orthogonal or diagonal line, limited only by the edge of the board. If an opposing piece intervenes, it may be captured by moving to that square and removing it from the board. A ranging piece must stop where it captures, and cannot bypass a piece that is in its way. If a friendly piece intervenes, the moving piece is limited to a distance that stops short of the intervening piece; if the friendly piece is adjacent, it cannot move in that direction at all.

The ranging pieces are the great general, vice general, rook general, bishop general, free eagle, soaring eagle, horned falcon, queen, water buffalo, chariot soldier, fire demon, lion hawk, dragon king, dragon horse, rook, bishop, vertical mover, side mover, reverse chariot, vertical soldier, side soldier and lance.

==== Range jumping pieces ====
A few powerful pieces may jump over any number of pieces (including zero), friend or foe, along a diagonal or orthogonal, but only when making a capture. These are the great general, vice general, rook general, and bishop general.

However, they may only jump over other pieces of lower rank, whether friend or foe. None may jump a king or prince of either side. The relevant ranking is:

1. King, prince
2. Great general
3. Vice general
4. Rook general, bishop general

That is, bishop and rook generals cannot jump over any other range-jumping piece.

The range jumpers can nevertheless capture each other, even if they cannot jump over each other and there are other pieces outside the ranking in the way. (For example, though a rook general cannot jump over an enemy great general, it may still capture the great general.) This extends to the king and prince, which can be captured with or without jumping (even though they have no range-jumping ability).

Some descriptions of the game do not limit this ability to moves making a capture. However, most mention that these pieces have two types of move, ranging and range jumping, suggesting that the capture rule may have been mistakenly omitted.

==== Multiple captures ====
The lion, lion hawk, free eagle, soaring eagle and horned falcon have sequential multiple-capture abilities, called "lion moves". The fire demon can "burn" multiple pieces simultaneously. These unusual moves are described below.

==== Other ====
The heavenly tetrarch cannot move to an adjacent square, and has other idiosyncrasies; the fire demon 'burns' adjacent pieces. This is best described below.

==== Repeated board positions ====
A player is not allowed to make a move that would return the board to a previous position, with the same player to move. This rule prevents games from entering into a repeated loop.

However, evidence from chu shogi problems suggests that this at least does not apply to a player who is in check or whose pieces are attacked, as otherwise one could win via perpetual check or perpetual pursuit. The modern chu shogi rule as applied by the Japanese Chu Shogi Association (JCSA) is as follows, and presumably tenjiku shogi should be similar. If one side is making attacks on other pieces (however futile) with his moves in the repeat cycle, and the other is not, the attacking side must deviate, while in case of checking the checker must deviate regardless of whether the checked side attacks other pieces. In the case of consecutive passes, the side passing first must deviate, making turn passing to avoid zugzwang pointless if the opponent is in a position where he can pass his turn too. If none of these are applicable, repetition is a draw.

=== Promotion ===
Tenjiku shogi pieces that occur in chu shogi promote as they do in that game, with the exceptions of the lion and queen, which do not promote in chu shogi.

A player's promotion zone consists of the five far ranks, at the original line of the opponent's pawns and beyond. When a promotable piece makes a move entering the promotion zone, or makes a capture within the promotion zone—including captures entering, leaving, or entirely within the zone—it has the option of "promoting" to a more powerful rank.

The historical sources do not provide guidance on whether pieces which take multiple steps per move are allowed to promote by crossing into the promotion zone and back out again. Chu shogi does not offer guidance here either, because such pieces do not promote in chu shogi. The Chess Variant Pages adopt the stipulation that a move allows promotion if and only if:

- It starts outside and ends inside the promotion zone, or:
- It is a capture and starts inside the promotion zone.

By this rule, igui or capturing does not allow promotion if the move begins and ends outside the promotion zone, even if it passes in and back out along the way.

Promotion is effected by turning the piece over after it moves, revealing the name of its promoted rank. As such, a promoted piece cannot then promote a second time. Promotion is never mandatory, and in some cases it may be beneficial to leave the piece unpromoted. Promotion is permanent and promoted pieces may not revert to their original rank.

Promoting a piece has the effect of changing how that piece moves. See above for what each piece promotes to and below for how they move.

The king, great general, vice general, free eagle, lion hawk, and fire demon do not promote, nor can already promoted pieces promote further.

If a piece is not promoted upon entering the promotion zone, then it may only promote if it makes a capture. This is reset by leaving the zone and reentering: promotion is possible on such a reentry even without a capture.

If a piece which cannot retreat or move to the side advances to the far rank, so that it would otherwise have no further legal move, it is trapped. These pieces are the pawn, knight, iron general, and lance. In practice this would never occur for pawns or lances, which promote to pieces which keep their old moves, so that there is never any reason to defer their promotion, as stalemate is a loss for the stalemated player, and there are no other rules that might require this to happen, such as the lion-protection rules of chu shogi.

The situation for the knight and iron general, which promote to pieces that do not keep their old moves, is unclear. Since there could be a reason to defer their promotion, it is possible that they receive a second chance to promote at the far rank on a non-capture, as in chu shogi. (In chu shogi, this provision applies to pawns, which are not completely upward compatible with the gold generals they promote to because of the rules against trading lions.) This second chance, if it exists, could likewise be declined, leaving the knight or iron general as an immobile "dead piece" (死に駒). However, this is uncertain, because it is not clear when the rule of pawn promotion was added to chu shogi (before or after the invention of tenjiku shogi), and because the Edo-era sources have numerous lacunae in the rules for the variants other than sho shogi and chu shogi.

=== Movement diagrams ===
In the diagrams below, the different types of moves are coded by symbol and by color: blue for step moves, green for multiple capture, red for range moves, yellow for jumps, and orange for ranging jumps.

Notation
☆	Jumps to this square, bypassing any intervening piece.
○	Steps a limited number of squares along a straight line.
●	Steps within an area, not restricted to a straight line. Must stop upon capture.
☆	Jumps to this square, then continues as a step mover.
●	Steps a limited number of squares within an area, and may capture more than once.
!	igui (capture without moving). Counts for two steps.
☆	May jump directly to this square, or reach it through a multiple move.
│	Ranges along a straight line, crossing any number of empty squares
─	Ranges along a straight line, crossing any number of empty squares
╲	Ranges along a straight line, crossing any number of empty squares
╱	Ranges along a straight line, crossing any number of empty squares
☆	Jumps to this square, then continues as a range mover.
│	Jumps along a straight line, crossing any number of squares, but only when making a capture; otherwise, moves exactly as a ranging piece.
─	Jumps along a straight line, crossing any number of squares, but only when making a capture; otherwise, moves exactly as a ranging piece.
╲	Jumps along a straight line, crossing any number of squares, but only when making a capture; otherwise, moves exactly as a ranging piece.
╱	Jumps along a straight line, crossing any number of squares, but only when making a capture; otherwise, moves exactly as a ranging piece.
※	Burns any adjacent enemy pieces wherever it stops (background color indicates movement).

==== Individual pieces ====
Pieces are arranged in this section so that, if they promote, they promote into the piece above them. Piece names with a grey background are present at the start of the game; those with a blue background only appear with promotion. Betza's funny notation has been included in brackets for easier reference, with the extension that the notation xxxayyyK stands for an xxxK move possibly followed by an yyyK move, not necessarily in the same direction. Larger numbers of 'legs' can be indicated by repeated application of 'a', or by numbers: thus a3K means a piece that can take up to three steps of a king. By default continuation legs can go into all directions, but can be restricted to a single line by a modifier 'v' ("vertical", interpreted relative to the piece's current position on its path). The default modality of all legs is the ability to move and capture: other possibilities are specified explicitly. Thus mKa3K means a piece that takes up to three steps of a king, but must stop when it first captures. Square brackets are used to make it clear what legs the a modifier chains together: thus DaK would denote a dabbaba move followed by a king move, but D[aK] would denote a piece that can move as a dabbaba, or twice as a king.

Another extension is that inequalities can be used in place of numbers denoting range: thus, while R4 is a piece that moves like a rook, but only up to four squares, R(2≤n≤4) is a piece that moves like a rook, but only two, three, or four squares. Further, pn refers to cannon-like pieces that can jump at most n pieces along their path, and pp means the same as p∞ (just as WW is synonymous with W∞, both meaning a rook). Finally, x stands for "shooting": the xK for instance can pass its turn (shooting empty squares), or it can shoot (capture) any adjacent enemy piece without moving.

Jeweled general (challenging player's king) 玉将 gyokushō	Prince 太子 taishi
○ / ○ / ○; ○ / 玉 / ○; ○ / ○ / ○; Step: The king can step one square in any direction, orthogonal or diagonal. (K); Note: The king can move into check at any time, although this is almost always a blunder.	○ / ○ / ○; ○ / 太 / ○; ○ / ○ / ○; Step: The prince can move one square in any direction. (K); Note: The prince can move into check at any time.
King general (reigning player's king) 王将 ōshō	Drunk elephant 酔象 suizō
○ / ○ / ○; ○ / 王 / ○; ○ / ○ / ○; Step: The king can step one square in any direction, orthogonal or diagonal. (K); Note: The king can move into check at any time, although this is almost always a blunder.	○ / ○ / ○; ○ / 象 / ○; ○ / / ○; Step: The drunken elephant can move one square in any direction except directly backward, giving it seven directions of movement. (FfrlW)
Vice general 副将 fukushō	Great general 大将 taishō
The vice general may make either a range-jumping move or an area move on any one turn.: ╲ / / / / / / ╱; / ╲ / / / / ╱; / / ╲ / / ╱; / / / 副; / / ╱ / / ╲; / ╱ / / / / ╲; ╱ / / / / / / ╲; ● / ● / ● / ● / ● / ● / ●; ● / ● / ● / ● / ● / ● / ●; ● / ● / ● / ● / ● / ● / ●; ● / ● / ● / 副 / ● / ● / ●; ● / ● / ● / ● / ● / ● / ●; ● / ● / ● / ● / ● / ● / ●; ● / ● / ● / ● / ● / ● / ●; Range jump: When making a capture, the vice general can jump any number of lower-ranking pieces along any one diagonal. Otherwise it ranges without jumping.; It cannot jump a king, prince, great general, or another vice general. It can capture a king, prince, great general, another vice general, or any other piece by jumping.: Area move: The vice general can step in any direction, orthogonal or diagonal, up to three times in one turn. That is, it can step in another direction after its first or second step. It need not take all three steps. It must stop when it captures. (BcppB[mKa3K] + restrictions); It can return to the square it started from, allowing the player to "skip" a turn.	╲ / / / │ / / / ╱; / ╲ / / │ / / ╱; / / ╲ / │ / ╱; ─ / ─ / ─ / 大 / ─ / ─ / ─; / / ╱ / │ / ╲; / ╱ / / │ / / ╲; ╱ / / / │ / / / ╲; Range jump: When making a capture, the great general can jump any number of lower-ranking pieces in any one of the eight directions. Otherwise it ranges without jumping. (QcppQ + restrictions); It cannot jump a king, prince, or another great general. It can capture a king, prince, another great general, or any other piece by jumping.
Bishop general 角将 kakushō	Rook general 飛将 hishō
╲ / / / / / / ╱; / ╲ / / / / ╱; / / ╲ / / ╱; / / / 用; / / ╱ / / ╲; / ╱ / / / / ╲; ╱ / / / / / / ╲; Range jump: When making a capture, the bishop general can jump any number of lower-ranking pieces along any diagonal. Otherwise it ranges without jumping. (BcppB + restrictions); It cannot jump a king, prince, or another range-jumping general. It can capture a king, prince, another range-jumping general, or any other piece by jumping. Because it cannot move orthogonally, an unpromoted bishop general can only reach half the squares on the board.	/ / / │; / / / │; / / / │; ─ / ─ / ─ / 升 / ─ / ─ / ─; / / / │; / / / │; / / / │; Range jump: When making a capture, the rook general can jump any number of lower-ranking pieces along any orthogonal. Otherwise it ranges without jumping. (RcppR + restrictions); It cannot jump a king, prince, or another range-jumping general. It can capture a king, prince, another range-jumping general, or any other piece by jumping.
Horned falcon 角鷹 kakuō	Soaring eagle 飛鷲 hijū
╲ / / / / / / ╱; / ╲ / / ☆ / / ╱; / / ╲ / ! / ╱; ─ / ─ / ─ / 鷹 / ─ / ─ / ─; / / ╱ / │ / ╲; / ╱ / / │ / / ╲; ╱ / / / │ / / / ╲; Range: The horned falcon can move any number of free squares along any direction except directly forwards.; Lion move: It can step twice, or jump two squares, directly forward, capturing up to two pieces. This power includes igui and skipping a turn (see "Lion"). (BrlbRf[avW]fD)	/ / / │; / ☆ / / │ / / ☆; / / ! / │ / !; ─ / ─ / ─ / 鷲 / ─ / ─ / ─; / / ╱ / │ / ╲; / ╱ / / │ / / ╲; ╱ / / / │ / / / ╲; Range: The soaring eagle can move any number of free squares in any direction except diagonally forward.; Lion move: It can step twice, or jump two squares, diagonally forward, capturing up to two pieces. This power includes igui and skipping a turn (see "Lion"). (RbBf[avF]fA)
Dragon horse 龍馬 ryūme	Dragon king 龍王 ryūō
The dragon horse moves as either a bishop or a king.: ╲ / / / / / / ╱; / ╲ / / / / ╱; / / ╲ / ○ / ╱; / / ○ / 馬 / ○; / / ╱ / ○ / ╲; / ╱ / / / / ╲; ╱ / / / / / / ╲; Range: It can move any number of free squares along any of the four diagonal directions.; Step: It can move one square in any orthogonal direction. (WB)	The dragon king moves as either a rook or a king.: / / / │; / / / │; / / ○ / │ / ○; ─ / ─ / ─ / 龍 / ─ / ─ / ─; / / ○ / │ / ○; / / / │; / / / │; Range: It can move any number of free squares along any of the four orthogonal directions.; Step: It can move one square in any diagonal direction. (FR)
Bishop 角行 kakugyō	Rook 飛車 hisha
╲ / / / / / / ╱; / ╲ / / / / ╱; / / ╲ / / ╱; / / / 角; / / ╱ / / ╲; / ╱ / / / / ╲; ╱ / / / / / / ╲; Range: The bishop can move any number of free squares along any of the four diagonal directions. (B); Because it cannot move orthogonally, an unpromoted bishop can only reach half the squares on the board.	/ / / │; / / / │; / / / │; ─ / ─ / ─ / 飛 / ─ / ─ / ─; / / / │; / / / │; / / / │; Range: The rook can move any number of free squares along any of the four orthogonal directions. (R)
Ferocious leopard 猛豹 mōhyō	Gold general 金将 kinshō
○ / ○ / ○; / 豹; ○ / ○ / ○; Step: The leopard can step one square in the four diagonal directions, or directly forward or backward, giving it six directions of movement. (FfbW); That is, it can move to any of the six adjacent squares ahead or behind it.	○ / ○ / ○; ○ / 金 / ○; / ○; Step: The gold general can step one square in the four orthogonal directions, or diagonally forward, giving it six directions of movement. (WfF); It cannot move diagonally backward.
	Pawn 歩兵 fuhyō
	○; 歩; Step: A pawn can step one square directly forward. (fW); Since a pawn cannot move backward or to the sides, it is trapped when it reaches the far rank. In practice, pawns are promoted whenever possible.
Fire demon 火鬼 kaki	Heavenly tetrarch 四天王 shitennō
The fire demon may either make a range move or an area move on any one turn. In addition, it has the power to "burn".: ╲ / / / / / / ╱; / ╲ / / / / ╱; / / ※ / ※ / ※; ─ / ─ / ※ / 火 / ※ / ─ / ─; / / ※ / ※ / ※; / ╱ / / / / ╲; ╱ / / / / / / ╲; ● / ● / ● / ● / ● / ● / ●; ● / ● / ● / ● / ● / ● / ●; ● / ● / ※ / ※ / ※ / ● / ●; ● / ● / ※ / 火 / ※ / ● / ●; ● / ● / ※ / ※ / ※ / ● / ●; ● / ● / ● / ● / ● / ● / ●; ● / ● / ● / ● / ● / ● / ●; Range: It can move any number of free squares in the four diagonal directions, or to the sides.; Note: This is the move stated by the Shōgi Zushiki and Sho Shōgi Zushiki. However, Western sources have a ranging move along the file instead of along the rank.: Area move: It can step in any direction up to three times per turn. It can change direction after its first or second step, and it need not take all three steps. However, unlike the lion, it must stop when it captures.; It can return to the square it started from, allowing the player to "skip" a turn, but does not have the lion power of igui.: Burn: Wherever the fire demon stops, all adjacent opposing pieces except fire demons are removed from the board, in addition to any piece on the square it lands on. That is, a fire demon can capture up to eight pieces per turn (one it displaces, and seven it burns on adjacent squares).; Passive burn: Any piece stopping next to an opposing fire demon is removed from the board (after making its capture, if any). Such so-called "suicide moves" do not count as a turn for the stationary player: the fire demon passively burns opposing pieces that land on adjacent squares without using up a turn. (BrlR[mKa3K] + immediate xK); Conflict between fire demons: When one fire demon lands next to another, it is only the moving piece that is immolated. The stationary fire demon survives, as do all other adjacent pieces.	The tetrarch cannot move to any adjacent square, and is not blocked from moving by pieces on those squares, but it can capture such pieces without moving.: ╲ / / / │ / / / ╱; / ☆ / / ☆ / / ☆; / / ! / ! / !; ○ / ☆ / ! / 天 / ! / ☆ / ○; / / ! / ! / !; / ☆ / / ☆ / / ☆; ╱ / / / │ / / / ╲; Igui: It can capture a piece on any adjacent square without moving. (See "Lion" below.); Range: It can move any number of free squares along any one of the four diagonals or along the orthogonal file, skipping any intervening piece on the adjacent square. (It is not a range jumper and cannot jump any other piece anywhere else on its path.); Limited range: It can move two or three squares orthogonally sideways. Although it skips any intervening piece on the first square, it cannot jump a piece on the second square. If it captures on the second square, it must stop there. (B(≥2)fbR(≥2)rlR(2≤n≤3)cxK); In English this piece is usually pluralized as 'Heavenly Tetrarchs', as this could refer to all four tetrarchs (the Four Heavenly Kings). Nevertheless, it seems more likely that the piece is intended to be singular, because there are four chariot soldiers in the initial position and hence four potential tetrarchs.
Water buffalo 水牛 suigyū	Chariot soldier 車兵 shahei
╲ / / / / / / ╱; / ╲ / / ○ / / ╱; / / ╲ / ○ / ╱; ─ / ─ / ─ / 水 / ─ / ─ / ─; / / ╱ / ○ / ╲; / ╱ / / ○ / / ╲; ╱ / / / / / / ╲; Range: The water buffalo can move any number of free squares in the four diagonal directions, or orthogonally sideways.; Limited range: It can move one or two squares directly forward or backward. (BrlRfbR2); Note: Since a piece's promotion is part of its move, the water buffalo burns all surrounding enemy pieces upon promotion to fire demon.	╲ / / / │ / / / ╱; / ╲ / / │ / / ╱; / / ╲ / │ / ╱; / ○ / ○ / 車 / ○ / ○; / / ╱ / │ / ╲; / ╱ / / │ / / ╲; ╱ / / / │ / / / ╲; Range: The chariot soldier can move any number of free squares in the four diagonal directions, or directly forward or backward.; Limited range: It can move one or two squares sideways. (BfbRrlR2)
Side soldier 横兵 ōhei	Vertical soldier 竪兵 shuhei
/ / / ○; / / / ○; ─ / ─ / ─ / 黄 / ─ / ─ / ─; / / / ○; Range: The side soldier can move any number of free squares orthogonally sideways.; Limited range: It can move one or two squares directly forward.; Step: It can move one square directly backward. (WfR2rlR)	/ / │; / / │; / / │; ○ / ○ / 立 / ○ / ○; / / ○; Range: The vertical soldier can move any number of free squares orthogonally forward.; Limited range: It can move one or two squares orthogonally sideways.; Step: It can move one square directly backward. (WfRrlR2)
Knight 桂馬 keima	Iron general 鉄将 tesshō
☆ / / ☆; / 桂; Jump: The knight jumps at an angle intermediate between orthogonal and diagonal, amounting to one square forward plus one square diagonally forward, in a single motion. That is, it has a choice of two forward destinations. It ignores any intervening piece on the way to its destination. (ffN); Since a knight cannot move backward or to the sides, it is trapped when it reaches the penultimate rank.	○ / ○ / ○; / 鉄; Step: The iron general can move one square forward, either orthogonally or diagonally, giving it three directions of movement. (fK); Since an iron general cannot move backward or to the sides, it is trapped when it reaches the far rank.
Free eagle 奔鷲 honjū	Lion hawk 獅鷹 shiō
╲ / / / │ / / / ╱; / ☆ / / ☆ / / ☆; / / ! / │ / !; ─ / ☆ / ─ / 就 / ─ / ☆ / ─; / / ! / │ / !; / ☆ / / ☆ / / ☆; ╱ / / / │ / / / ╲; Range: The free eagle can move any number of free squares in any direction.; Lion move: It can move twice as a cat-sword (one square in any diagonal direction; able to change direction for its second move), with the jump, igui, and multiple-capture abilities. (See "Lion" for details.). (QDA[aF]); Based on descriptions of the lion having a double king move, it is thought that the double cat-sword move includes jumping a piece.	╲ / / / / / / ╱; / ☆ / ☆ / ☆ / ☆ / ☆; / ☆ / ! / ! / ! / ☆; / ☆ / ! / 師 / ! / ☆; / ☆ / ! / ! / ! / ☆; / ☆ / ☆ / ☆ / ☆ / ☆; ╱ / / / / / / ╲; Range: The lion hawk can move any number of free squares in the four diagonal directions. (BNAD[aK]); Lion move: It can move as a lion, with the jump, igui, and multiple-capture abilities. (See "Lion" for details.)
Queen 奔王 honnō	Lion 獅子 shishi
╲ / / / │ / / / ╱; / ╲ / / │ / / ╱; / / ╲ / │ / ╱; ─ / ─ / ─ / 奔 / ─ / ─ / ─; / / ╱ / │ / ╲; / ╱ / / │ / / ╲; ╱ / / / │ / / / ╲; Range: The queen can move any number of free squares in any of the eight directions, orthogonal or diagonal. (Q)	The lion has a special movement ability commonly called a 'lion move' or 'lion power'. It is shown here in two diagrams for clarity.: ● / ● / ● / ● / ●; ● / ● / ● / ● / ●; ● / ● / 獅 / ● / ●; ● / ● / ● / ● / ●; ● / ● / ● / ● / ●; ☆ / ☆ / ☆ / ☆ / ☆; ☆ / ! / ! / ! / ☆; ☆ / ! / 獅 / ! / ☆; ☆ / ! / ! / ! / ☆; ☆ / ☆ / ☆ / ☆ / ☆; Lion move: The lion can step in any direction, and capture, up to twice in a turn. This move is equivalent to two turns for a king.; Unlike area movers, the lion can continue after a capture on the first step, capturing up to two pieces on each turn.; By moving back to its starting square, it can effectively capture a piece on an adjacent square without moving. This is called 居喰い igui "stationary feeding".; It can also do the same to an empty square, without capturing anything. This is traditionally indicated by tapping the lion and leaving it in place.; Jump: A lion can jump anywhere within a distance of two squares: That is, anywhere it could reach in two step moves on an empty board, though of course it cannot land on a square occupied by a friendly piece. This is equivalent to jumping in any of the eight diagonal or orthogonal directions, or making any of the jumps of a knight in Western chess. (NAD[aK]); Note: The restrictions when capturing a lion in chu shogi do not apply in tenjiku shogi.
Phoenix 鳳凰 hōō	Kirin 麒麟 kirin
☆ / / / / ☆; / / ○; / ○ / 鳳 / ○; / / ○; ☆ / / / / ☆; Step: The phoenix can move one square in one of the four orthogonal directions.; Jump: It can jump to the second square in one of the four diagonal directions. (WA)	/ / ☆; / ○ / / ○; ☆ / / 麒 / / ☆; / ○ / / ○; / / ☆; Step: The kirin can move one square in one of the four diagonal directions.; Jump: It can jump to the second square in one of the four orthogonal directions. (FD); Note: Because of its unusual movement, an unpromoted kirin can only reach half the squares on the board.
Free boar 奔猪 honcho	Flying ox 飛牛 higyū
╲ / / / / / / ╱; / ╲ / / / / ╱; / / ╲ / / ╱; ─ / ─ / ─ / 猪 / ─ / ─ / ─; / / ╱ / / ╲; / ╱ / / / / ╲; ╱ / / / / / / ╲; Range: The free boar can range any number of free squares along any one of the four diagonal directions, or directly to either side, giving it six directions of movement. (BrlR)	╲ / / / │ / / / ╱; / ╲ / / │ / / ╱; / / ╲ / │ / ╱; / / / 牛; / / ╱ / │ / ╲; / ╱ / / │ / / ╲; ╱ / / / │ / / / ╲; Range: The flying ox can move any number of free squares along any one of the four diagonal directions, or directly forward or backward, giving it six directions of movement. (BfbR)
Side mover 横行 ōgyō	Vertical mover 竪行 shugyō
/ / / ○; ─ / ─ / ─ / 横 / ─ / ─ / ─; / / / ○; Range: The side mover can move any number of free squares orthogonally sideways.; Step: It can move one square directly forward or backward. (WrlR)	/ │; / │; / │; ○ / 竪 / ○; / │; / │; / │; Range: The vertical mover can move any number of free squares orthogonally forward or backward.; Step: It can move one square orthogonally sideways. (WfbR)
Copper general 銅将 dōshō	Silver general 銀将 ginshō
○ / ○ / ○; / 銅; / ○; Step: The copper general can move one square directly forward or backward, or one square diagonally forward, giving it four directions of movement. (fKbW)	○ / ○ / ○; / 銀; ○ / / ○; Step: The silver general can move one square in the four diagonal directions, or directly forward, giving it five directions of movement. (FfW)
Multi general 雜将 suishō	Flying stag 飛鹿 hiroku
/ / / │; / / / │; / / / │; / / / 雜; / / ╱ / / ╲; / ╱ / / / / ╲; ╱ / / / / / / ╲; Range: The multi general can move any number of free squares directly forward or diagonally backward, giving it three directions of movement. (fRbB)	/ │; / │; ○ / │ / ○; ○ / 鹿 / ○; ○ / │ / ○; / │; / │; Range: The flying stag can move any number of free squares directly forward or backward.; Step: It can move one square in any direction. (fbRK)
Dog 犬 inu	Blind tiger 盲虎 mōko
/ ○; / 犬; ○ / / ○; Step: The dog can move one square directly forward, or diagonally backward, giving it three directions of movement. (fWbF)	○ / / ○; ○ / 虎 / ○; ○ / ○ / ○; Step: The blind tiger can move one square in any direction except directly forward, giving it seven directions of movement. (FrlbW)
White horse 白駒 hakku	Whale 鯨鯢 keigei
╲ / / / │ / / / ╱; / ╲ / / │ / / ╱; / / ╲ / │ / ╱; / / / 駒; / / / │; / / / │; / / / │; Range: The white horse can move any number of free squares orthogonally forward or backward, or diagonally forward, giving it four directions of movement. (fQbR)	/ / / │; / / / │; / / / │; / / / 鯨; / / ╱ / │ / ╲; / ╱ / / │ / / ╲; ╱ / / / │ / / / ╲; Range: The whale can move any number of free squares orthogonally forward or backward, or diagonally backward, giving it four directions of movement. (fRbQ)
Lance 香車 kyōsha	Reverse chariot 反車 hensha
│; │; │; 香; Range: The lance can move any number of free squares directly forward, giving it only one direction of movement. (fR); Since a lance cannot move backward or to the sides, it is trapped when it reaches the far rank. In practice, lances are promoted whenever possible.	│; │; │; 反; │; │; │; Range: The reverse chariot can move any number of free squares orthogonally forward or backward, giving it two directions of movement. (fbR)

=== Repetition ===
A player may not make a move if the resulting position is one that has previously occurred in the game with the same player to move. This is called repetition (千日手 sennichite). Note that certain pieces have the ability to pass in certain situations (lions, soaring eagles, horned falcons, vice generals, fire demons, free eagles, and lion hawks). Such a pass move leaves the position unchanged, but it does not violate the repetition rule, as it will now be the turn of the other player to move. Of course, two consecutive passes are not possible, as the first player will see the same position as before.

However, evidence from chu shogi problems suggests that this at least does not apply to a player who is in check or whose pieces are attacked, as otherwise one could win via perpetual check or perpetual pursuit. The modern chu shogi rule as applied by the Japanese Chu Shogi Association (JCSA) is as follows, and presumably tenjiku shogi should be similar. If one side is making attacks on other pieces (however futile) with his moves in the repeat cycle, and the other is not, the attacking side must deviate, while in case of checking the checker must deviate regardless of whether the checked side attacks other pieces. In the case of consecutive passes, the side passing first must deviate, making turn passing to avoid zugzwang pointless if the opponent is in a position where he can pass his turn too. Only the fourth repetition is forbidden by these rules. If none of these are applicable, repetition is a draw.

=== Check and mate ===
When a player makes a move, such that the opponent's only remaining king or prince could be captured on the following move, the move is said to give check; the king or prince is said to be in check. If a player's last king or prince is in check and no legal move by that player will get it out of check, the checking move is also mate, and effectively wins the game.

Unlike Western chess, a player need not move out of check in tenjiku shogi, and indeed may even move into check. Although obviously not often a good idea, a player with more than one royal may occasionally sacrifice one of these pieces as part of a gambit.

=== Game end ===
A player who captures the opponent's sole remaining king or prince wins the game. Thus a player who is checkmated or stalemated will lose. The very artificial situation of a smothered stalemate, where no moves are possible (even those that would expose the king), is not covered in the historical sources. On their pages for chu shogi and dai shogi, The Chess Variant Pages rule this as a loss for the stalemated player, for definiteness.

In practice these winning conditions are rarely fulfilled, as a player will typically resign when checkmated, as otherwise when loss is inevitable.

A player who makes an illegal move loses immediately. (This rule may be relaxed in casual games.)

The historical rules do not address the situation where both sides' kings perish in one move, because one king captures the other, which was standing next to a friendly fire demon. But in practice this would never occur.

== Handicaps ==
Games between players of disparate strength may be played with handicaps, but there is no known historical handicap system for tenjiku shogi. Games such as chess and chu shogi can serve as models for a handicap system, where a player can surrender one or more pieces, or trade them for other pieces and/or the first move.

== Game notation ==
The method used in English-language texts to express shogi moves was established by George Hodges in 1976. It is derived from the algebraic notation used for chess, but modifications have been made for tenjiku shogi.

A typical example is P-8g. The first letter represents the piece moved (see above). Promoted pieces have a + added in front of the letter. e.g., +P for a promoted pawn. The designation of the piece is followed by a symbol indicating the type of move: - for an ordinary move or x for a capture. Next is the designation for the square on which the piece lands. This consists of a number representing the file and a lowercase letter representing the rank, with 1a being the top right corner (as seen from Black's point of view) and 16p being the bottom left corner. (This method of designating squares is based on Japanese convention, which, however, uses Japanese numerals instead of letters. For example, the square 2c is denoted by 2三 in Japanese.)

If a lion, horned falcon, soaring eagle or Heavenly Tetrarch captures by igui, or the fire demon burns, the square of the piece being captured is used instead of the destination square, and this is preceded by the symbol !. A piece moving next to a fire demon (suicide move) is followed by a *. If a double or triple capture is made, than subsequent captures are added after the first capture.

If a move entitles the player to promote the piece, then a + is added to the end to signify that the promotion was taken, or an = to indicate that it was declined. For example, Nx7d= indicates a knight capturing on 7d without promoting.

In cases where the above notation would be ambiguous, the designation of the start square is added after the designation for the piece in order to make clear which piece is meant.

Moves are commonly numbered as in chess.

In handicap games White plays first, so Black's move 1 is replaced by an ellipsis.

== Notes on disputed moves ==
In general, the presentation of the rules above follows The Chess Variant Pages, except for whether or not the water buffalo can immediately burn enemy pieces upon promotion.

- Lion hawk

The Shogi Association (TSA) rules, for unknown reasons, interpreted "like a lion" to mean that the lion hawk did not have the full lion powers of jump and double capture, but only a two-step area move (BmKa2K). This interpretation was never made in Japanese articles on tenjiku shogi, and has largely been abandoned in the West as well. Giving the lion hawk full lion powers brings the piece into line with the rest of the game, and is the only interpretation supported by the historical sources.

- Free eagle

Western sources give the free eagle the move of a queen plus the ability to jump to the second square along an orthogonal (QD). This however seems unlikely, given that such a move could be more easily expressed as "moves as queen or kirin".

Japanese Wikipedia states "it cannot jump on the diagonals, but can jump pieces on the orthogonals" (斜めの場合は飛び越えては行けないが、縦横の場合は駒を飛び越えて行ける) (QpR). The diagram shows an orthogonal range jump (QcppR), but the free eagle does not appear in the ranking list of range-jumping pieces. It also notes that "as this piece is not affected by the ranking of the pieces, one can immediately capture the opponent's king from the initial setup" (この駒は駒の格の影響を受けない為、(上記の動きの場合は)初期配置の状態からいきなり敵の王将を取ることが可能である), which seems unlikely.

However, the Edo-era Sho Shōgi Zushiki states that it moves "as a queen or two times as a cat sword in two directions" (如奔王亦猫刄再度歩兼二行) (Q[asF]), which could be taken as requiring the piece to finish on one of the orthogonals, if not exactly a jump; while elsewhere in the Sho Shōgi Zushiki and in the Shōgi Zushiki it says that in addition to moving as a queen, it can make a cat-sword move (one square in one of the four diagonals) twice (奔王の動きに加えて、猫刄の動き（斜め四方向に1マス動く）を2度できる) (Q[aF]), which has no such implication, but which Japanese Wikipedia says is thought to mean a jump (QAD[aF]). This creates a symmetry between the free eagle and lion hawk: the lion hawk is a lion combined with the diagonal moves of the queen (BWNADcaKmcabK), while the free eagle is a queen combined with the diagonal moves of the lion (QADcaFmcabF).

- Fire demon

TSA rules state that if you move your fire demon next to an opposing fire demon, only your fire demon is immolated; all other adjacent pieces survive. This implies that a fire demon's passive burn (how it automatically burns enemy pieces that end up next to it without moving) is faster than its active burn (how it burns enemy pieces that it moves next to). A few computer programs and books stipulate that other adjacent pieces are immolated as well, with only the opposing fire demon surviving, but this interpretation is not widely followed. Both variants are playable, though the TSA rules are more consistent in not allowing the suicidal fire demon to burn anything at all.

Japanese Wikipedia states only that "When a fire demon moves next to a fire demon, the moving piece is burnt" (火鬼が火鬼の隣に移動したときは、動いた方が焼かれる), without mentioning the fate of surrounding pieces (thus perhaps implying that nothing special happens to them).

The two Edo-era sources have the orthogonal ranging move along the rank of the board (BvRmKa3K+immediate xK). Western sources have it move along the file (BsRmKa3K+immediate xK), but moving along the rank (as used in this article) would be more in keeping with the fire demon being a promoted water buffalo.

The fire demon's passive burn suggests that all adjacent enemy pieces burn when the water buffalo promotes, as otherwise that would be the only way a piece could ever stay next to an enemy fire demon.

- Heavenly tetrarch

Western sources do not have the ranging move along the orthogonal. However, the Sho Shōgi Zushiki states it moves "as a chariot soldier, also the eight neighboring squares without moving and taking two or three steps outside the periphery" (如車兵亦近八方不行其外周二三要用歩) (B(n≥2)vR(n≥2)sR(2≤n≤3)xK), and this is consistent with it being a promoted chariot soldier.

However, the two other Edo-era sources do not state that the heavenly tetrarch can perform igui, even though igui is explicitly stated for the pieces that incontrovertibly have that power. George Hodges (TSA) appears to have taken the igui power from a "Kyoto source" that currently cannot be located.

- Range-jumping generals

TSA rules state that the range-jumping generals cannot capture an equal or higher-ranking piece, not just that they cannot jump over them. This gives a huge advantage to Black, so that Black can win every game if played right, but is not supported by Japanese articles on tenjiku shogi and has been largely abandoned in the West as unplayable. This is due to the very terse wording of the historical documents, that do not make it clear if the capture of an equal or higher-ranking piece is allowed even if such a piece cannot be jumped over. The presence of the king in the hierarchy suggested the TSA rules, since the king cannot jump-capture at all, and in any situation where the enemy king could be jumped over it would not happen in practice as it would simply be captured. Due to the resulting playability problem, it was suggested that capturing would be allowed but not jumping, but this allowed for smothered mates in the opening and appeared to give a huge advantage to Black. The Chess Variant Pages allows the capture of equal or higher-ranking pieces except kings or princes, which removes this advantage to Black, but creates an inconsistency because nothing in the historical documents suggests that the king is treated specially apart from its rank.

However, in 2022 H. G. Muller noted that the presence of the king in the hierarchy might mean that one cannot jump over one's own king. (The fact that it would also forbid jumping over the enemy king becomes irrelevant since in such a position, it would always be possible and preferable to capture the enemy king instead.) This avoids creating an inconsistency in the rules. High-level game play also showed that the smothered mates can be defended against and do not create an unbalanced game, as long as one knows the correct opening lines (which could be determined by his tenjiku shogi engine).

== Strategy ==
=== Piece values ===
According to the German Chu Shogi Association, the average values of the pieces are (using the interpretations of the English-language sources):

Average piece values
Piece name	Approximate value	Promotion	Approximate value
Fire Demon	83	—	—
Great General	45	—	—
Vice General	39	—	—
Water Buffalo	17	Fire Demon	83
Rook General	23	Great General	45
Lion Hawk	25	—	—
Bishop General	21	Vice General	39
Free Eagle	22	—	—
Queen	22	Free Eagle	22
Lion	18	Lion Hawk	25
Soaring Eagle	18	Rook General	23
Horned Falcon	19	Bishop General	21
Chariot Soldier	18	Heavenly Tetrarch	12
Dragon King	14	Soaring Eagle	18
Dragon Horse	12	Horned Falcon	19
Rook	12	Dragon King	14
Vertical Soldier	8	Chariot Soldier	18
Side Soldier	7	Water Buffalo	17
Bishop	10	Dragon Horse	12
Vertical Mover	7	Flying Ox	16
Side Mover	7	Free Boar	16
Phoenix	3	Queen	22
Kirin	3	Lion	18
Lance	6	White Horse	14
Reverse Chariot	6	Whale	10
King	4	—	—
Drunk Elephant	3	Prince	4
Gold General	3	Rook	12
Ferocious Leopard	3	Bishop	10
Blind Tiger	3	Flying Stag	9
Silver General	2	Vertical Mover	7
Copper General	2	Side Mover	7
Iron General	2	Vertical Soldier	8
Knight	1	Side Soldier	7
Dog	1	Multi General	6
Pawn	1	Gold General	3

These average values do not take into account the special status of the king and prince as royal pieces. They have also been normalized so that the pawn is worth 1 point to avoid fractions. Additionally, pieces gain in value if they have a good chance of promotion (particularly for the water buffalo, which promotes to the most powerful piece in the game), and the jumping generals and fire demon tend to lose some power as the board empties (because they then cannot make full use of their jumping and burning abilities).

== See also ==
- Shogi variant
- Wa shogi
- Chu shogi
- Heian dai shogi
- Dai shogi
- Dai dai shogi
- Maka dai dai shogi
- Tai shogi
- Taikyoku shogi
