= Dōbutsu shōgi =

Small shogi game variant

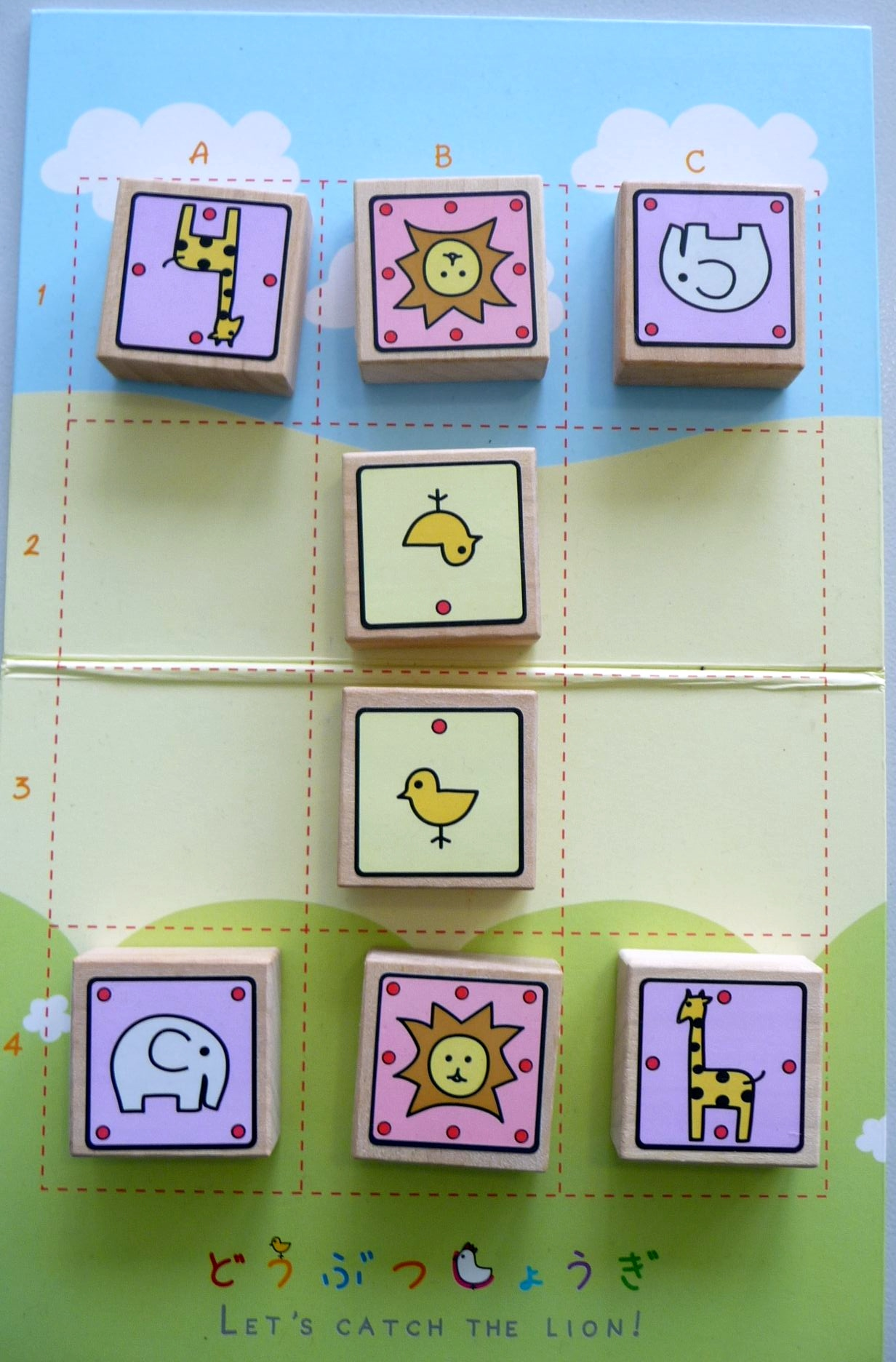
Dōbutsu shōgi

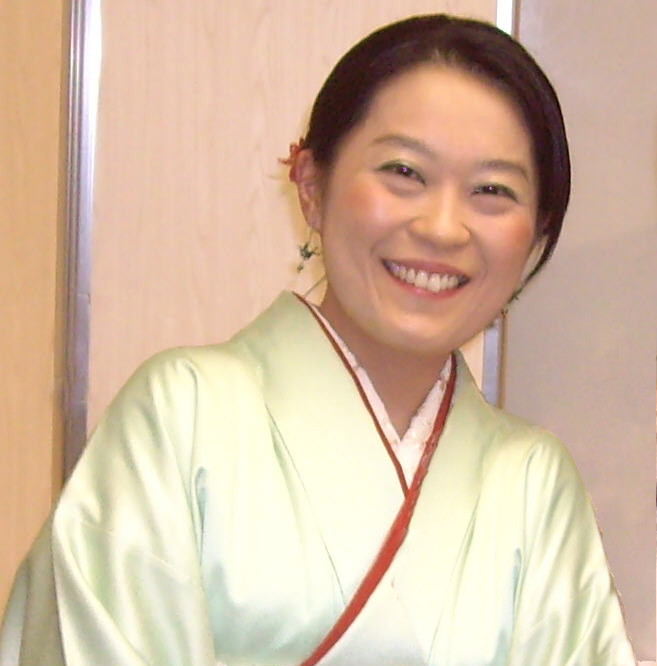
Madoka Kitao

Dōbutsu shōgi (どうぶつしょうぎ; "animal shogi") is a small shogi variant for young children and for young beginners starting the game. It was invented by women's professional shogi player Madoka Kitao (北尾 まどか, Kitao Madoka), partially to attract young girls to the game. The pieces were designed by fellow women's professional shogi player Maiko Fujita (藤田 麻衣子, Fujita Maiko). It is played on a 3×4 board and generally follows the rules of standard shogi, including drops, except that pieces can only move one square at a time, and the king reaching the enemy camp as an additional way to win the game.

The pieces are square, like children's blocks, have cartoon figures of the relevant animal rather than kanji to identify them, and often have dots on the sides and corners of the directions the pieces can move. The game has been marketed overseas as "Let's Catch the Lion!"

== Play ==
g	l	e
	c	
	C	
E	L	G

Each player starts the game with four pieces:

- A Lion (king) in the center of the home row ("forest")
- A Giraffe (rook) to the right of the king
- An Elephant (bishop) to the left of the king
- A Chick (pawn) in front of the king

Each moves as in standard shogi, but is limited to moving one square per turn. If the Chick advances two squares to reach the final rank (the "sky" for the player that started in the forest), it promotes to a Hen (tokin), which can move one square any way except diagonally backwards (like the gold general in shogi).

As in shogi, if a Hen is captured, it may only be dropped back into play as a Chick. However, standard restrictions on where one may drop a Chick, such as not being allowed to give immediate checkmate, have two Chicks on a file, or drop the Chick on the final rank, do not apply. A chick dropped on the final rank, however, does not promote (and may make no further moves until it is recaptured).

If the players play the same position three turns in a row, the game is a draw. Unlike in shogi, perpetual check is also a draw. There are two ways to win the game: capturing ("catching") the opponent's Lion, and advancing one's own Lion into the promotion zone (farthest rank), as long as doing so does not place one's Lion in check.

== Theoretical result ==
Dōbutsu shōgi was strongly solved in 2009 by Tetsuro Tanaka, who used retrograde analysis to determine the optimal outcome from every position reachable from the starting setup. There are 246,803,167 such reachable positions; a larger figure of 1,567,925,964 sometimes given for the game is an upper bound on all arrangements of the pieces, including positions that never arise in play.. The second player to move (White, in shogi terminology) has a winning strategy from the starting position, although the theoretical win may take up to 78 plies (39 moves on each side). Thus, the game begins in a zugzwang position, in which the first player to move is at a disadvantage. By symmetry, the game also begins in a Trébuchet position, a full-point zugzwang position, in which the side to begin movement eventually loses.

All opening moves for the first player except capturing the second player's chick delay loss by 78 plies with perfect play; capturing the chick delays loss by only 76 plies.

In general, as with their long-ranged counterparts, the giraffe is stronger than the elephant. Like most small variants of shogi, particularly micro shogi and minishogi, having pieces in hand ready to drop is highly advantageous. The game does not lend itself well to handicap play, because a handicap of an elephant or a giraffe results in the handicap taker having a relatively easy forced mate.

The variant of nana shogi shows that it is feasible to have a limited number of long-ranged pieces on such small-sized boards.

== Variation ==
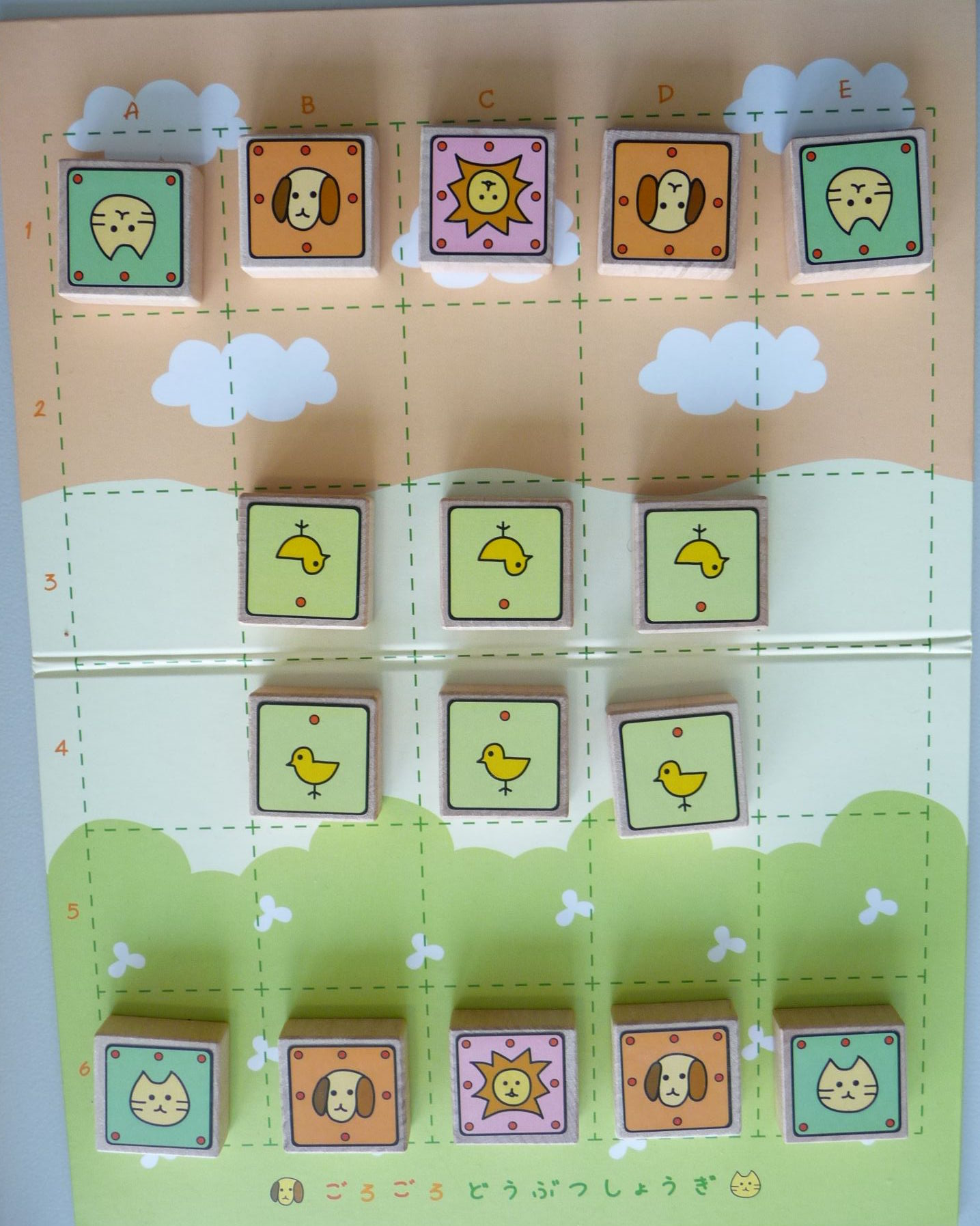
Goro goro shogi variant

Cat	Dog	Lion	Dog	Cat
	Chick	Chick	Chick	
	Chick	Chick	Chick	
Cat	Dog	Lion	Dog	Cat

A 5×6 version with 16 pieces is known as goro goro dōbutsu shōgi (ごろごろどうぶつしょうぎ), which is the same as goro goro shogi. On each player's side, it uses 3 chicks (pawns), 2 cats (silvers), 2 dogs (golds), and 1 lion (king). Chick and cat promote to hen and empowered cat (promoted silver) respectively which then move just like the dog. Promotion zones are the first and last 2 ranks. It has the same restrictions on dropped pieces in shogi including two pawns (nifu) and pawn drop with immediate checkmate (uchifuzume). Perpetual check (4 move repetition) is also a draw as in dōbutsu shōgi.

A 9×9 version of this game known as "Dobutsu shogi in the Greenwood" (in Japanese: おおきな森のどうぶつしょうぎ ōkina mori no dōbutsu shōgi, lit. Animal Shogi in big forest), which is identical to shogi, has been launched. The game features new pieces and since the board is large, the movements of the Elephant and Giraffe (bishop and rook in shogi) are unlimited. The new pieces are 2 boars (lances) and 2 rabbits (knights). Just like in standard shogi, the boar and rabbit can promote to empowered boar (promoted lance) and empowered rabbit (promoted knight) respectively which can move like the dog. While the elephant and giraffe can promote to empowered elephant (dragon horse) and empowered giraffe (dragon king) respectively.

== See also ==
- Shogi variant
- Whale shogi – played on 6×6 board with more pieces
- Dou shou qi
- Los Alamos chess
- Minichess
