= Minichess =

Family of chess variants played on a smaller board

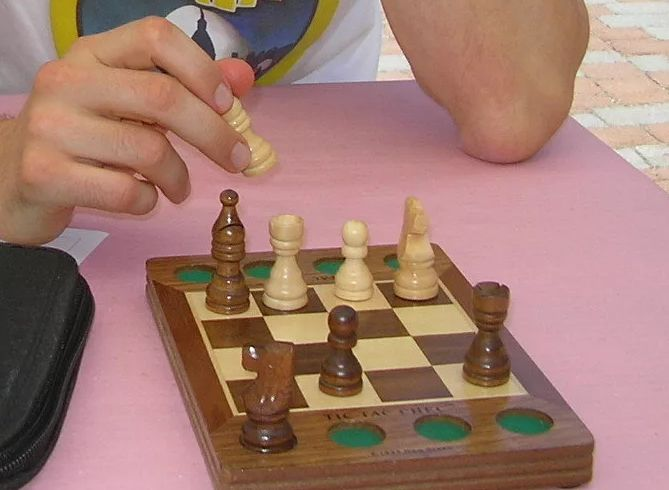
The game of Tic Tac Chec, played on a 4×4 board

Minichess is a family of chess variants played with regular chess pieces and standard rules, but on a smaller board. The motivation for these variants is to make the game simpler and shorter than standard chess. The first chess-like game implemented on a computer was the 6×6 chess variant Los Alamos chess. The low memory capacity of early computers meant that a reduced board size and a smaller number of pieces were required for the game to be implementable on a computer.

== 3×3 and 3×4 boards ==
Chess on a 3×3 board does not have any clearly defined starting position. However, it is a solved game: the outcome of every possible position is known. The best move for each side is known as well. The game was solved independently by Aloril in 2001 and by Kirill Kryukov in 2004. The solution by Kryukov is more complete, since it allows pawns to be placed everywhere, not only on the second row as by Aloril. The longest checkmate on a 3×3 board takes 16 moves. The number of unique legal positions is 54,687,564.

In 2009 Kryukov reported solving 3×4 chess, which also does not have a clearly defined starting position. On this board there are 167,303,246,916 legal positions and the longest checkmate takes 43 moves.

== 4×4, 4×5 and 4×8 chess ==
| a4 black rook | b4 black queen | c4 black king | d4 black rook |
| a3 black pawn | b3 black pawn | c3 black pawn | d3 black pawn |
| a2 white pawn | b2 white pawn | c2 white pawn | d2 white pawn |
| a1 white rook | b1 white queen | c1 white king | d1 white rook |

Silverman 4×4

| a5 black rook | b5 black queen | c5 black king | d5 black rook |
| a4 black pawn | b4 black pawn | c4 black pawn | d4 black pawn |
| a3 | b3 | c3 | d3 |
| a2 white pawn | b2 white pawn | c2 white pawn | d2 white pawn |
| a1 white rook | b1 white queen | c1 white king | d1 white rook |

Silverman 4×5

| a5 black king | b5 black knight | c5 black bishop | d5 black rook |
| a4 black pawn | b4 | c4 | d4 |
| a3 | b3 | c3 | d3 |
| a2 | b2 | c2 | d2 white pawn |
| a1 white rook | b1 white bishop | c1 white knight | d1 white king |

Microchess

| | a | b | c | d |
|---|---|---|---|---|---|
| 8 | a8 black king | b8 black bishop | c8 black knight | d8 black rook | 8 |
| 7 | a7 black pawn | b7 black pawn | c7 black pawn | d7 black pawn | 7 |
| 6 | a6 | b6 | c6 | d6 | 6 |
| 5 | a5 | b5 | c5 | d5 | 5 |
| 4 | a4 | b4 | c4 | d4 | 4 |
| 3 | a3 | b3 | c3 | d3 | 3 |
| 2 | a2 white pawn | b2 white pawn | c2 white pawn | d2 white pawn | 2 |
| 1 | a1 white king | b1 white bishop | c1 white knight | d1 white rook | 1 |
| | a | b | c | d |

Demi-chess

In 1981 mathematician David Silverman suggested a 4×4 chess variant, as shown on the diagram. The first player wins easily in this game (1. axb3+ Qxb3 2. cxb3+ Kxb3 (or 2...Kb4 3. bxc3#) 3. bxa3+ Kc4 4. Qa2#), so Silverman proposed a variant: Black can select a pawn, and White must make a first move with this pawn. However, in this case Black wins even more easily (select pawn b2, 1.bxa3 (or 1.bxc3) b2+ 2. Qxb2 Qxb2#). Currently, there is still no defined starting position for 4×4 chess. To make the variant more playable, Silverman finally proposed to insert a row between pawns and use the board 4×5. In this variant, pawns can move two squares on their first move, if the target square is free.

The 1995 game Tic Tac Chec, invented by Don Green, is played on a 4×4 board which starts empty. Each player has a knight, a rook, a bishop and a pawn, and players may place a piece on the board on their turn. Once each player has three pieces in play, pieces may be moved. Captured pieces are returned to the opponent, and may be replayed. A player wins if they are able to arrange their pieces into a line of four.

Another chess variant on a 4×5 board, Microchess, was invented by Glimne in 1997. Castling is allowed in this variant.

There is also variant on a 4×8 board, Demi-chess, which was invented by Peter Krystufek in 1986. Castling is allowed in this variant.

== 5×5 chess ==
| a5 black rook | b5 black knight | c5 black bishop | d5 black queen | e5 black king |
| a4 black pawn | b4 black pawn | c4 black pawn | d4 black pawn | e4 black pawn |
| a3 | b3 | c3 | d3 | e3 |
| a2 white pawn | b2 white pawn | c2 white pawn | d2 white pawn | e2 white pawn |
| a1 white rook | b1 white knight | c1 white bishop | d1 white queen | e1 white king |

Gardner

| a5 black king | b5 black queen | c5 black bishop | d5 black knight | e5 black rook |
| a4 black pawn | b4 black pawn | c4 black pawn | d4 black pawn | e4 black pawn |
| a3 | b3 | c3 | d3 | e3 |
| a2 white pawn | b2 white pawn | c2 white pawn | d2 white pawn | e2 white pawn |
| a1 white rook | b1 white knight | c1 white bishop | d1 white queen | e1 white king |

Baby chess (for black)

| a5 black bishop | b5 black knight | c5 black rook | d5 black queen | e5 black king |
| a4 black pawn | b4 black pawn | c4 black pawn | d4 black pawn | e4 black pawn |
| a3 | b3 | c3 | d3 | e3 |
| a2 white pawn | b2 white pawn | c2 white pawn | d2 white pawn | e2 white pawn |
| a1 white king | b1 white queen | c1 white rook | d1 white knight | e1 white bishop |

Jacobs–Meirovitz

| a5 black rook | b5 black bishop | c5 black king | d5 black queen | e5 black bishop |
| a4 black pawn | b4 black pawn | c4 black pawn | d4 black pawn | e4 black pawn |
| a3 | b3 | c3 | d3 | e3 |
| a2 white pawn | b2 white pawn | c2 white pawn | d2 white pawn | e2 white pawn |
| a1 white rook | b1 white knight | c1 white king | d1 white queen | e1 white knight |

Mallett

A board needs to be five squares wide to contain all kinds of chess pieces on the first row. In 1969, Martin Gardner suggested a chess variant on 5×5 board in which all chess moves, including pawn double-move, en-passant capture as well as castling can be made. Later AISE (Associazione Italiana Scacchi Eterodossi, "Italian Heterodox Chess Association") abandoned pawn double-move and castling. The game was largely played in Italy (including by correspondence) and opening theory was developed. The statistics of the finished games is the following:

- White won 40% of games.
- Black won 28%.
- 32% were draws.

Mehdi Mhalla and Frederic Prost weakly solved Gardner minichess in 2013 and proved the game-theoretic value to be a draw. Gardner minichess was also played by AISE with suicide chess and progressive chess rules. In 1980 HP shipped the HP-41C programmable calculator, which could play this game. The calculator was able to play on quite a decent level.

In 1989, Martin Gardner proposed another setup, which he called Baby chess. In difference from Gardner minichess, black pieces are mirrored. Paul Jacobs and Marco Meirovitz suggested another starting position for 5×5 chess shown at the right.

Jeff Mallett (main developer of Zillions of Games) suggested a setup in which White has two knights against two black bishops. Mhalla and Prost proved Mallett chess to be a forced win for White in 25 moves, although theoretically the game is drawn when played perfectly if White is given the bishops and Black the knights rather than vice versa.

== 5×6 chess ==
| a6 black queen | b6 black king | c6 black bishop | d6 black knight | e6 black rook |
| a5 black pawn | b5 black pawn | c5 black pawn | d5 black pawn | e5 black pawn |
| a4 | b4 | c4 | d4 | e4 |
| a3 | b3 | c3 | d3 | e3 |
| a2 white pawn | b2 white pawn | c2 white pawn | d2 white pawn | e2 white pawn |
| a1 white queen | b1 white king | c1 white bishop | d1 white knight | e1 white rook |

Petty chess

| a6 black queen | b6 black king | c6 black bishop | d6 black knight | e6 black rook |
| a5 black pawn | b5 black pawn | c5 black pawn | d5 black pawn | e5 black pawn |
| a4 | b4 | c4 | d4 | e4 |
| a3 | b3 | c3 | d3 | e3 |
| a2 white pawn | b2 white pawn | c2 white pawn | d2 white pawn | e2 white pawn |
| a1 white rook | b1 white knight | c1 white bishop | d1 white king | e1 white queen |

Speed chess

| a6 black rook | b6 black bishop | c6 black queen | d6 black king | e6 black knight |
| a5 black pawn | b5 black pawn | c5 black pawn | d5 black pawn | e5 black pawn |
| a4 | b4 | c4 | d4 | e4 |
| a3 | b3 | c3 | d3 | e3 |
| a2 white pawn | b2 white pawn | c2 white pawn | d2 white pawn | e2 white pawn |
| a1 white rook | b1 white bishop | c1 white queen | d1 white king | e1 white knight |

QuickChess

| a6 black rook | b6 black bishop | c6 black king | d6 black queen | e6 black knight |
| a5 black pawn | b5 black pawn | c5 black pawn | d5 black pawn | e5 black pawn |
| a4 | b4 | c4 | d4 | e4 |
| a3 | b3 | c3 | d3 | e3 |
| a2 white pawn | b2 white pawn | c2 white pawn | d2 white pawn | e2 white pawn |
| a1 white knight | b1 white queen | c1 white king | d1 white bishop | e1 white rook |

Elena chess

| a6 black rook | b6 black knight | c6 black bishop | d6 black queen | e6 black king |
| a5 black pawn | b5 black pawn | c5 black pawn | d5 black pawn | e5 black pawn |
| a4 | b4 | c4 | d4 | e4 |
| a3 | b3 | c3 | d3 | e3 |
| a2 white pawn | b2 white pawn | c2 white pawn | d2 white pawn | e2 white pawn |
| a1 white rook | b1 white knight | c1 white bishop | d1 white queen | e1 white king |

Chess Attack

| a6 black king | b6 black queen | c6 black bishop | d6 black knight | e6 black rook |
| a5 black pawn | b5 black pawn | c5 black pawn | d5 black pawn | e5 black pawn |
| a4 | b4 | c4 | d4 | e4 |
| a3 | b3 | c3 | d3 | e3 |
| a2 white pawn | b2 white pawn | c2 white pawn | d2 white pawn | e2 white pawn |
| a1 white rook | b1 white knight | c1 white bishop | d1 white queen | e1 white king |

MinitChess

There are several chess variants on 5×6 board. The earliest published one is Petty chess, which was invented by B. Walker Watson in 1930. Speed chess was invented by Mr. den Oude in 1988. Elena chess was invented by Sergei Sirotkin in 1999.

QuickChess was invented by Joseph Miccio in 1991. Pawn double-move and castling are not allowed in this variant, pawns can only promote to captured pieces. The game was sold by Amerigames International and received National Parenting Publications Award in 1993. Miccio obtained a US patent in 1993, which described three further chess variant on 5×6 board. Besides two variants similar to Speed chess and Elena Chess (same position of white pieces, position of black pieces is symmetrical), the patent claimed one further variant, which have been named later Chess Attack. Miccio advocated these games as educational tools for children to learn chess rules. The smaller board and less pieces would reduce the complexity of the game and allow for more quicker games. The piece setup like in Speed chess was intended to teach short side castling and setup as in Chess Attack - long side castling.

Laszlo Polgar published a book in 1994 Minichess 777+1 Positions (Quickchess teaches chess quick), completely devoted to chess on 5×6 board. Besides initial setup as in QuickChess, Polgar proposed to use any other possible setup of pieces, even asymmetrical ones. The book contained problems, combinations and games for 5×6 chess. Polgar recommended to use it as a first book to teach children to play chess.

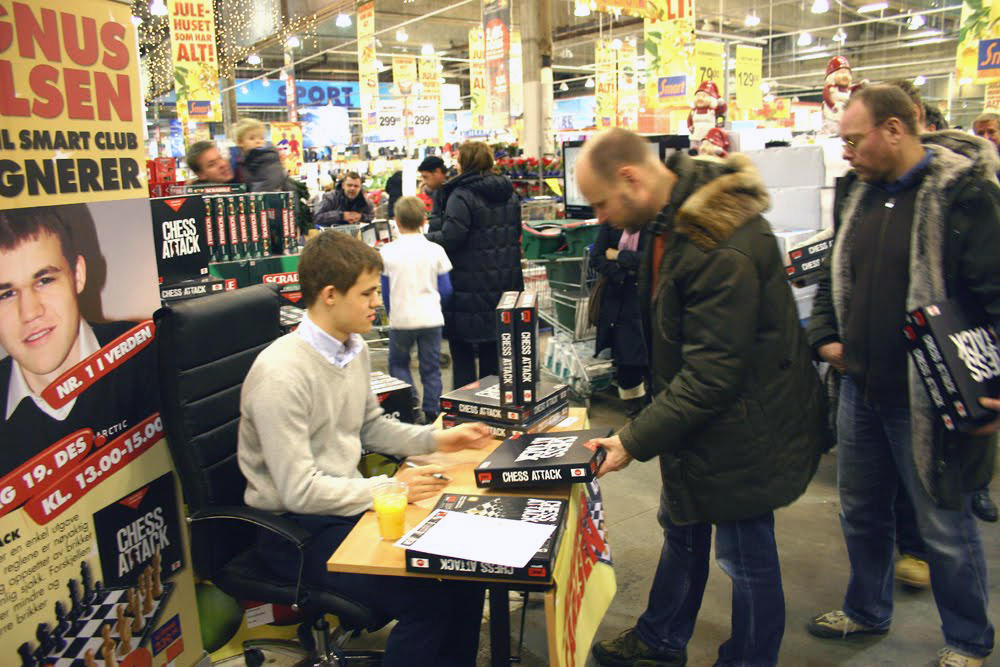
Magnus Carlsen promoting 5×6 chess variant Chess Attack

Chess Attack, which has the same setup as Gardner minichess (but played on a bigger board) is sold by Norway company Yes Games AS since 2008. In this variant, pawns can make double-moves and en-passant capture is allowed. The game was endorsed by Magnus Carlsen and Alexandra Kosteniuk.

MinitChess, published in 2010 based on earlier 2007 and 2009 variants, is played on a Gardner board with the black pieces mirrored. In this variant there is no castling, no double pawn moves, pawn promotion only to queen, victory by king capture or when an opponent has no legal move (including moves which permit the king to be captured—these moves are legal), and draw after 40 moves by each side. In addition, the bishop is replaced by a bad bishop that has the additional option of moving to any adjacent empty square on its turn, allowing it to change color. This variant is intended to be easy to write computer programs to play and harder for expert human players of standard chess, while still retaining the essential character of the game: several computer tournaments have been held.

== 6×6 chess ==
| | a | b | c | d | e | f |
|---|---|---|---|---|---|---|---|
| 6 | a6 black rook | b6 black bishop | c6 black knight | d6 black king | e6 black bishop | f6 black rook | 6 |
| 5 | a5 black pawn | b5 black pawn | c5 black pawn | d5 black pawn | e5 black pawn | f5 black pawn | 5 |
| 4 | a4 | b4 | c4 | d4 | e4 | f4 | 4 |
| 3 | a3 | b3 | c3 | d3 | e3 | f3 | 3 |
| 2 | a2 white pawn | b2 white pawn | c2 white pawn | d2 white pawn | e2 white pawn | f2 white pawn | 2 |
| 1 | a1 white rook | b1 white bishop | c1 white knight | d1 white king | e1 white bishop | f1 white rook | 1 |
| | a | b | c | d | e | f |

Diana chess

| | a | b | c | d | e | f |
|---|---|---|---|---|---|---|---|
| 6 | a6 black rook | b6 black bishop | c6 black king | d6 black knight | e6 black bishop | f6 black rook | 6 |
| 5 | a5 black pawn | b5 black pawn | c5 black pawn | d5 black pawn | e5 black pawn | f5 black pawn | 5 |
| 4 | a4 | b4 | c4 | d4 | e4 | f4 | 4 |
| 3 | a3 | b3 | c3 | d3 | e3 | f3 | 3 |
| 2 | a2 white pawn | b2 white pawn | c2 white pawn | d2 white pawn | e2 white pawn | f2 white pawn | 2 |
| 1 | a1 white rook | b1 white bishop | c1 white knight | d1 white king | e1 white bishop | f1 white rook | 1 |
| | a | b | c | d | e | f |

L'Hermitte chess

| | a | b | c | d | e | f |
|---|---|---|---|---|---|---|---|
| 6 | a6 black rook | b6 black knight | c6 black queen | d6 black king | e6 black knight | f6 black rook | 6 |
| 5 | a5 black pawn | b5 black pawn | c5 black pawn | d5 black pawn | e5 black pawn | f5 black pawn | 5 |
| 4 | a4 | b4 | c4 | d4 | e4 | f4 | 4 |
| 3 | a3 | b3 | c3 | d3 | e3 | f3 | 3 |
| 2 | a2 white pawn | b2 white pawn | c2 white pawn | d2 white pawn | e2 white pawn | f2 white pawn | 2 |
| 1 | a1 white rook | b1 white knight | c1 white queen | d1 white king | e1 white knight | f1 white rook | 1 |
| | a | b | c | d | e | f |

Los Alamos chess

| | a | b | c | d | e | f |
|---|---|---|---|---|---|---|---|
| 6 | a6 black rook | b6 black knight | c6 black queen | d6 black king | e6 black knight | f6 black rook | 6 |
| 5 | a5 black pawn | b5 black pawn | c5 black pawn | d5 black pawn | e5 black pawn | f5 black pawn | 5 |
| 4 | a4 | b4 | c4 | d4 | e4 | f4 | 4 |
| 3 | a3 | b3 | c3 | d3 | e3 | f3 | 3 |
| 2 | a2 white pawn | b2 white pawn | c2 white pawn | d2 white pawn | e2 white pawn | f2 white pawn | 2 |
| 1 | a1 white rook | b1 white knight | c1 | d1 white king | e1 white knight | f1 white rook | 1 |
| | a | b | c | d | e | f |

Los Alamos chess, game 2

Besides Los Alamos chess, there are other chess variants played on a 6×6 board. The game Diana chess (or Ladies chess) was suggested by Hopwood in 1870. The initial position is shown above. There are no queens on the board and pawns cannot promote to queens either. Pawns cannot move forward two squares on their initial move. Castling is done by switching the positions of the king and rook. The same condition as in chess apply for castling (e.g., the king should not be under check, neither rook nor king should have moved before etc.) Los Alamos chess game 2 is a variant of Los Alamos chess where White starts without a queen.

Serge L'Hermitte suggested in 1969 a game with nearly the same setup as Diana chess, except that the positions of the black king and knight are exchanged from their positions in Diana chess. Additionally, knights cannot move within the first three moves, and the king can move to the knight position without losing the right to castle.

| | a | b | c | d | e | f |
|---|---|---|---|---|---|---|---|
| 6 | a6 black knight | b6 black bishop | c6 black queen | d6 black king | e6 black bishop | f6 black knight | 6 |
| 5 | a5 black pawn | b5 black pawn | c5 black pawn | d5 black pawn | e5 black pawn | f5 black pawn | 5 |
| 4 | a4 | b4 | c4 | d4 | e4 | f4 | 4 |
| 3 | a3 | b3 | c3 | d3 | e3 | f3 | 3 |
| 2 | a2 white pawn | b2 white pawn | c2 white pawn | d2 white pawn | e2 white pawn | f2 white pawn | 2 |
| 1 | a1 white knight | b1 white bishop | c1 white queen | d1 white king | e1 white bishop | f1 white knight | 1 |
| | a | b | c | d | e | f |

Simpler chess, without rooks

| | a | b | c | d | e | f |
|---|---|---|---|---|---|---|---|
| 6 | a6 black rook | b6 black bishop | c6 black queen | d6 black king | e6 black bishop | f6 black rook | 6 |
| 5 | a5 black pawn | b5 black pawn | c5 black pawn | d5 black pawn | e5 black pawn | f5 black pawn | 5 |
| 4 | a4 | b4 | c4 | d4 | e4 | f4 | 4 |
| 3 | a3 | b3 | c3 | d3 | e3 | f3 | 3 |
| 2 | a2 white pawn | b2 white pawn | c2 white pawn | d2 white pawn | e2 white pawn | f2 white pawn | 2 |
| 1 | a1 white rook | b1 white bishop | c1 white queen | d1 white king | e1 white bishop | f1 white rook | 1 |
| | a | b | c | d | e | f |

Simpler chess, without knights

| | a | b | c | d | e | f |
|---|---|---|---|---|---|---|---|
| 6 | a6 black rook | b6 black knight | c6 black bishop | d6 black bishop | e6 black knight | f6 black rook | 6 |
| 5 | a5 black pawn | b5 black pawn | c5 black pawn | d5 black pawn | e5 black pawn | f5 black pawn | 5 |
| 4 | a4 | b4 | c4 | d4 | e4 | f4 | 4 |
| 3 | a3 | b3 | c3 | d3 | e3 | f3 | 3 |
| 2 | a2 white pawn | b2 white pawn | c2 white pawn | d2 white pawn | e2 white pawn | f2 white pawn | 2 |
| 1 | a1 white rook | b1 white knight | c1 white bishop | d1 white bishop | e1 white knight | f1 white rook | 1 |
| | a | b | c | d | e | f |

Simpler chess, without king or queen. With no king to be checkmated, the object of this game is to capture all enemy pieces.

| | a | b | c | d | e | f |
|---|---|---|---|---|---|---|---|
| 6 | a6 black rook | b6 black bishop | c6 black queen | d6 black king | e6 black bishop | f6 black rook | 6 |
| 5 | a5 black pawn | b5 black pawn | c5 black pawn | d5 black pawn | e5 black pawn | f5 black pawn | 5 |
| 4 | a4 | b4 | c4 | d4 | e4 | f4 | 4 |
| 3 | a3 | b3 | c3 | d3 | e3 | f3 | 3 |
| 2 | a2 white pawn | b2 white pawn | c2 white pawn | d2 white pawn | e2 white pawn | f2 white pawn | 2 |
| 1 | a1 white rook | b1 white knight | c1 white queen | d1 white king | e1 white knight | f1 white rook | 1 |
| | a | b | c | d | e | f |

Mallett 6×6 chess

A. Wardley proposed in 1977 a Simpler chess, a family of 6×6 chess variants, in which a pair of pieces is removed from both sides: rooks, knights, bishop or even king and queen. Removing bishops results in Los Alamos chess; the result of removing rooks, knights, or royals is shown on the diagrams above.

Jeff Mallett proposed the setup knights versus bishops also on 6×6 board. On a normal 8×8 board, bishops are considered slightly more valuable than knights (especially two bishops). However, on 6×6 boards, because of the smaller size of the board, two knights are presumably equal to two bishops.

== See also ==
- Hexapawn – played with only pawns on a 3×3 board
- Octopawn – played with only pawns on a 4×4 board
- Los Alamos chess – played on 6×6 board
- Dōbutsu shōgi – played on 3×4 board
- Microshogi – played on 4×5 board
- Minishogi – played on 5×5 board
- Whale shogi – played on 6×6 board
