= Tori shogi =

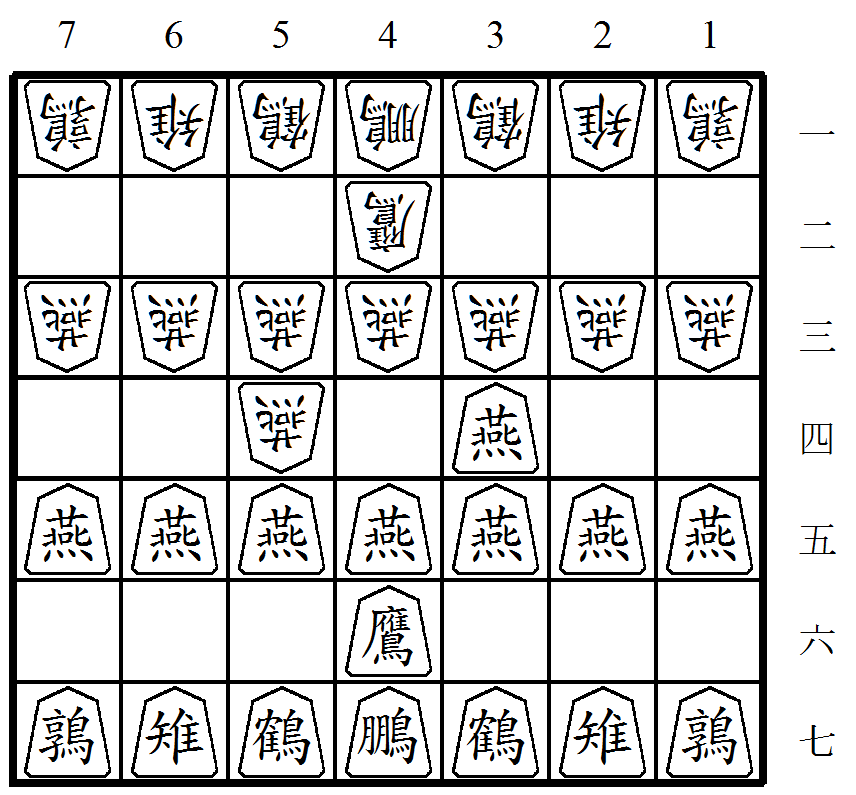
- Tori shogi diagram, start position
- Years active: Late 18th century to present
- Genres: Board game Abstract strategy game
- Players: 2
- Setup time: < 2 minutes
- Playing time: 30 minutes to 2 hours
- Chance: None
- Age range: 5+
- Skills: strategy, tactics
- Synonyms: Bird shogi

Tori shōgi (禽将棋 or 鳥将棋, 'bird chess') is a variant of shogi (Japanese chess), which was invented by Toyota Genryu in 1799 despite being traditionally attributed to his master Ōhashi Sōei. It was first published in 1828 and again in 1833. The game is played on a 7×7 board and uses the drop rule; it is the only traditional shogi variant, possibly besides wa shogi, to do so. This is one of the more popular shogi variants. There were tournaments in London and Royston in the 1990s and early 2000s.

== Rules of the game ==
=== Objective ===
The objective of the game is to capture your opponent's phoenix.

=== Game equipment ===
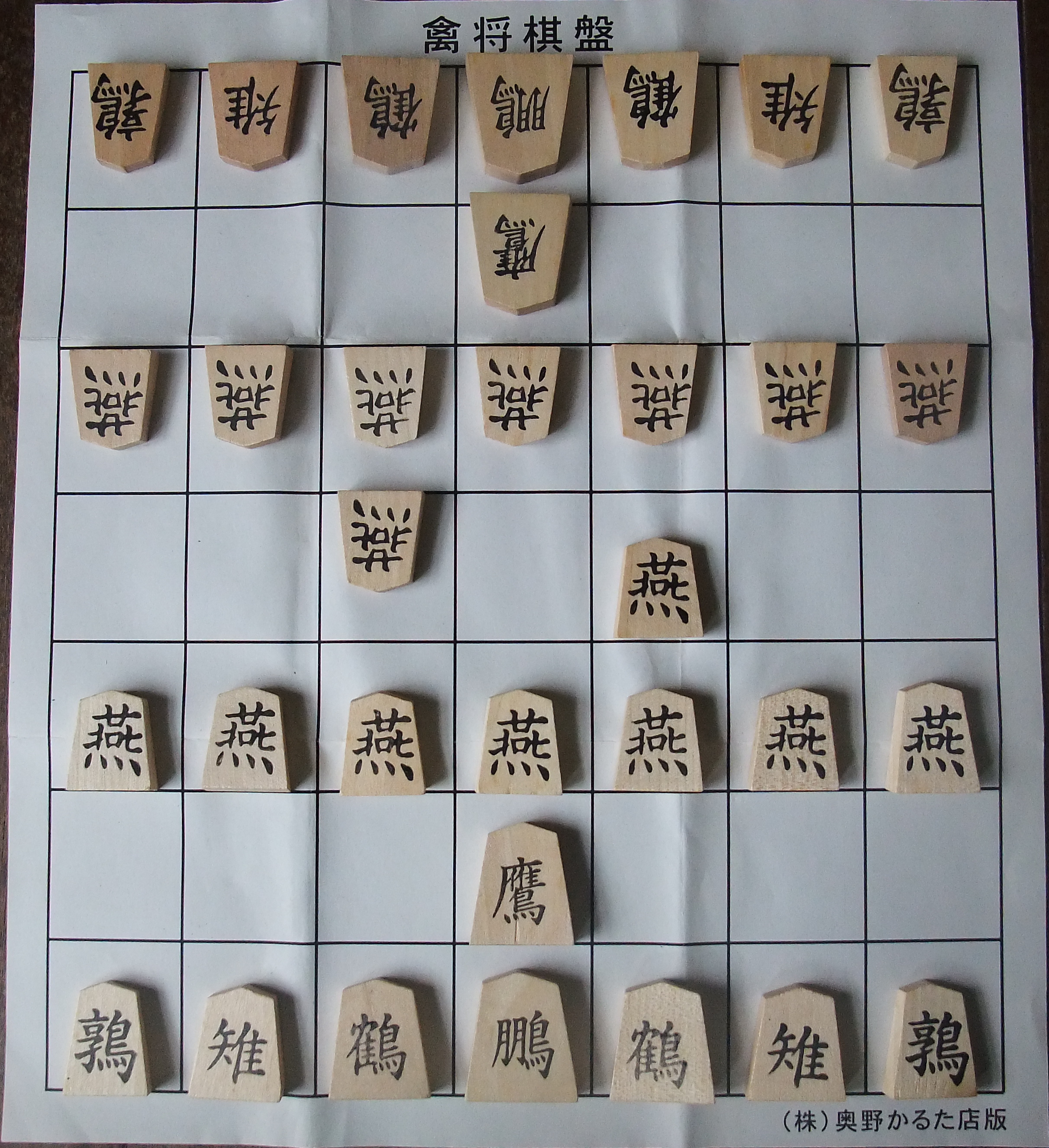
Tori shogi

Two players, Black and White (or 先手 sente and 後手 gote), play on a board ruled into a grid of 7 ranks (rows) by 7 files (columns). The squares are undifferentiated by marking or color.

Each player has a set of 16 wedge-shaped pieces, of slightly different sizes. From largest to smallest (or most to least powerful) they are:

- 1 phoenix
- 1 falcon
- 2 cranes
- 2 pheasants
- 2 quails (a left and a right)
- 8 swallows

In line with the bird theme, each piece is named after a different kind of bird.

Each piece has its name in the form of a kanji written on its face. On the reverse side of some pieces is another character, often in a different color (commonly red instead of black) and are usually cursive; this reverse side is turned up to indicate that the piece has been promoted during play. (The quail are different: on one side is the character for "quail", while on the other is the character for left or right; some people will play with the "left"/"right" side up instead of the "quail" side up.)

The pieces of the two sides do not differ in color, but instead each piece is shaped like a wedge, and faces forward, toward the opposing side. This shows who controls the piece during play.

==== Table of pieces ====
Listed here are the pieces of the game in English and Japanese:

Piece	Kanji	Romaji	Abbreviation
Phoenix	鵬	ootori, hō	Ph
Falcon	鷹	taka, ō	Fa
*Mountain Hawk Eagle	鵰	kumataka, shū	+Fa
Crane	鶴	tsuru, kaku	Cr
Pheasant	雉	kiji, chi	Pt
Quail (right and left)	鶉	uzura, jun	Q (RQ & LQ)
Swallow	燕	tsubame, en	Sw
*Wild goose	鴈	kari, gan	+Sw

The first pronunciation of each piece is the Japanese pronunciation, while the second is the Sino-Japanese pronunciation. The promoted pieces (*) are usually called eagle and goose in English.

=== Setup ===
Below is a diagram showing the setup of the pieces. Black pieces are in bold face in the first diagram, and bigger in the second, and move first:

RQ	Pt	Cr	Ph	Cr	Pt	LQ
			Fa
Sw	Sw	Sw	Sw	Sw	Sw	Sw
		Sw		**Sw**
**Sw**	**Sw**	**Sw**	**Sw**	**Sw**	**Sw**	**Sw**
			**Fa**
**LQ**	**Pt**	**Cr**	**Ph**	**Cr**	**Pt**	**RQ**

7	6	5	4	3	2	1
鶉	雉	鶴	鵬	鶴	雉	鶉	一
			鷹				二
燕	燕	燕	燕	燕	燕	燕	三
		燕		燕			四
燕	燕	燕	燕	燕	燕	燕	五
			鷹				六
鶉	雉	鶴	鵬	鶴	雉	鶉	七

=== Gameplay ===
The players alternate making a move, with Black moving first. (The traditional terms 'black' and 'white' are used to differentiate the sides during discussion of the game, but are no longer literally descriptive.) A move consists of moving a single piece on the board and potentially promoting that piece, displacing (capturing) an opposing piece or dropping a captured piece onto an empty square of the board. Each of these options is detailed below.

=== Movement and capture ===
An opposing piece is captured by displacement: That is, if a piece moves to a square occupied by an opposing piece, the opposing piece is displaced and removed from the board. A piece cannot move to a square occupied by a friendly piece (meaning another piece controlled by the moving player).

Each piece on the game moves in a characteristic pattern. Pieces move either orthogonally (that is, forward, backward, left, or right, in the direction of one of the arms of a plus sign, +), or diagonally (in the direction of one of the arms of a multiplication sign, ×).

Many pieces are capable of several kinds of movement, with the type of movement most often depending on the direction in which they move. The movement categories are:

==== Step movers ====
Some pieces move only one square at a time. (If a friendly piece occupies an adjacent square, the moving piece may not move in that direction; if an opposing piece is there, it may be displaced and captured.)

The step movers are the phoenix, falcon, crane, and the 8 swallows on each side.

==== Limited ranging piece ====
The eagle can move along a limited number (2) of free (empty) squares along a straight line in certain directions. Other than the limited distance, it moves like ranging pieces (see below).

==== Jumping pieces ====
The pheasant and goose can jump, that is, they can pass over any intervening piece, whether friend or foe, with no effect on either.

==== Ranging pieces ====
The quail and eagle can move any number of empty squares along a straight line, limited only by the edge of the board. If an opposing piece intervenes, it may be captured by moving to that square and removing it from the board. A ranging piece must stop where it captures, and cannot bypass a piece that is in its way. If a friendly piece intervenes, the moving piece is limited to a distance that stops short of the intervening piece; if the friendly piece is adjacent, it cannot move in that direction at all.

=== Promotion ===
A player's promotion zone consists of the two farthest ranks, at the original line of the opponent's falcon and beyond. If a piece crosses the board within the promotion zone, including moves into, out of, or wholly within the zone, but not including drops (see below), then that player must promote the piece at the end of the turn. Promotion is effected by turning the piece over after it moves, revealing the name of its promoted rank.

Promoting a piece has the effect of changing how that piece moves until it is removed from the board (see above). Only two pieces promote, as follows:

- A falcon promotes to an eagle.
- A swallow promotes to a goose.

When captured, pieces lose their promoted status.

=== Individual pieces ===
Below are diagrams indicating each piece's movement. Pieces with a grey heading start out in the game; those with a blue heading only appear on the board after promotion. Betza's funny notation has been included in brackets for easier reference.

**Notation**
○	Steps to an adjacent square or has a limited range
☆	Jumps to a non-adjacent square, bypassing any intervening piece
│	Ranges along a straight line, crossing any number of empty squares
╲	Ranges along a straight line, crossing any number of empty squares
╱	Ranges along a straight line, crossing any number of empty squares

Phoenix			
Step: The phoenix can step one square in any direction, orthogonal or diagonal. (K)	○ / ○ / ○; ○ / 鵬 / ○; ○ / ○ / ○	The phoenix is the "royal" or "objective" piece.	
Falcon		Mountain Hawk Eagle	
Step: The falcon can step one square in any direction, orthogonal or diagonal except directly backwards. (FfrlW) This is the move of the drunk elephant in chu shogi.	○ / ○ / ○; ○ / 鷹 / ○; ○ / / ○	Range: The eagle can move any number of free squares diagonally forward or directly backward; or, Limited range: It can move one or two squares diagonally backward; or, Step: It can step one square directly forward or sideways. (fBbRWbB2)	╲ / / / / ╱; / ╲ / ○ / ╱; / ○ / 鵰 / ○; / ○ / │ / ○; ○ / / │ / / ○
Crane		Pheasant	
Step: The crane can move one square in the four diagonal directions; or, It can move one square orthogonally forward or backward. (FfbW) That is, it can move to any of the six adjacent squares ahead or behind it, but not directly to the side. This is the move of the ferocious leopard in chu shogi.	○ / ○ / ○; / 鶴; ○ / ○ / ○	Jump: The pheasant can jump to the second square directly forward; or, Step: It can move one square diagonally backward. (fDbF) Because of its unusual movement, a pheasant can only reach half the squares on the board.	/ ☆; / 雉; ○ / / ○
Left Quail		Right Quail	
Range: The left quail can move any number of free squares directly forward or diagonally backward to the right; or, Step: It can move one square diagonally backward to the left. (fRbrBblF)	/ │; / │; / 鶉; ○ / / ╲; / / / ╲	Range: The right quail can move any number of free squares directly forward or diagonally backward to the left; or, Step: It can move one square diagonally backward to the right. (fRblBbrF)	/ / │; / / │; / / 鶉; / ╱ / / ○; ╱
Swallow		Wild Goose	
Step: The swallow can step one square forward. (fW)	○; 燕	Jump: The goose can jump to the second square directly backward or diagonally forward. (fAbD) Because of its unusual movement, a goose can only reach about a quarter of the squares on the board.	☆ / / ☆; / 鴈; / ☆

=== Drops ===
Captured pieces are truly captured in tori shogi. They are retained "in hand", and can be brought back into play under the capturing player's control. On any turn, instead of moving a piece across the board, a player can take a piece he has previously captured and place it on any empty square, facing the opponent. The piece is now part of the forces controlled by that player. This is termed dropping the piece, or just a drop.

A drop cannot capture a piece; that requires an additional move.

Pieces that are dropped in the promotion zone do not promote as a result: Promotion requires that piece make a normal movement on a subsequent turn, as detailed under "Promotion", above. Pieces that are promoted when captured lose that promotion; they are unpromoted when dropped back on the board.

There are three restrictions when dropping swallows:

A swallow may not be dropped on the furthest rank, since it would have no legal move on subsequent turns.

A swallow cannot be dropped into the same file (vertical column) as two other unpromoted swallows controlled by the same player. (A goose, or promoted swallow, does not count as a swallow when considering this drop restriction.)

A swallow cannot be dropped where the opponent would have no way to prevent his phoenix being captured on the next move. In other words, a swallow cannot be dropped to give immediate checkmate.

=== Check and mate ===
When a player makes a move such that the opponent's phoenix could be captured on the following move, the move is said to give check to the phoenix; the phoenix is said to be in check. If a player's phoenix is in check and no legal move by that player will get the phoenix out of check, the checking move is also mate, and effectively wins the game.

A player is not allowed to give perpetual check. This is not a rule in itself, but arises from the repetition rule. Either the checker has to break off the checking, or the checked side has to stop evading, after which his phoenix is captured.

=== Repetition ===
The rule for repetition (千日手 sennichite) in tori shogi is that if the same position occurs three times with the same player to play by repetition of moves, the player starting the sequence must vary the move. For two positions to be considered the same, the pieces in hand must be the same, as well as the position on the board.

=== Game end ===
A player who captures the opponent's phoenix wins the game. In practice this rarely happens, as a player will resign when checkmated, as otherwise when loss is inevitable.

A player who makes an illegal move loses immediately. (This rule may be relaxed in casual games.)

== Handicaps ==
Games between players of disparate strength are often played with handicaps. In a handicap game, one or more of White's pieces is removed before the start of play, and White plays the first move of the game. Note that the pieces removed at the beginning play no further part in the game—they are not available for drops. The imbalance created by this method of handicapping is not as strong as it is in chess, because material advantage is not as powerful in tori shogi as in chess.

Common handicaps, in increasing order of size, are as follows:

- Remove White's left quail
- Remove White's falcon
- Two pieces: remove White's falcon and left quail
- Three pieces: remove White's falcon and both quails

Other handicaps are also occasionally used. The relationship between handicaps and differences in rank is not universally agreed upon.

== Game notation ==
The method used in English-language texts to express shogi moves was established by George Hodges in 1976. It is derived from the algebraic notation used for chess, but differs in several respects. Modifications have been made for tori shogi.

A typical example is Sw-6d. The first letter represents the piece moved: Sw = swallow, Q = quail, Pt = pheasant, Cr = crane, Fa = falcon, Ph = phoenix. Promoted pieces have a + added in front of the letter, as +Sw for a goose (promoted swallow). The designation of the piece is followed by a symbol indicating the type of move: - for an ordinary move, x for a capture, or * for a drop. Next is the designation for the square on which the piece lands. This consists of a number representing the file and a lowercase letter representing the rank, with 1a being the top right corner (as seen from Black's point of view) and 7g being the bottom left corner. (This method of designating squares is based on Japanese convention, which, however, uses Japanese numerals instead of letters. For example, the square 2c is denoted by 2三 in Japanese.)

If a move requires the player to promote the piece, then a + is added to the end to signify that the promotion was taken. For example, SWx4a+ indicates a swallow capturing on 4a and promoting.

In cases where the above notation would be ambiguous, the designation of the start square is added after the designation for the piece in order to make clear which piece is meant. For example, if Black has a crane at both 3c and 5c, which can be moved to the square 4b in front of the phoenix, then these are distinguished as Cr5c-4b (moving the left one) and Cr3c-4b (moving the right one). Optionally, a prefix may be added to the quail to distinguish the left quail from the right quail, LQ and RQ, when the left quail appears to the right of the right quail.

Moves are commonly numbered as in chess. For example, the start of a game might look like this:

    1. Swx3c   Swx5e
    2. Fax5e   Fax3c
    3. Cr-5f   Q-1b

In handicap games White plays first, so Black's move 1 is replaced by an ellipsis.

== See also ==
- Shogi variant
- Minishogi
- Judkins shogi
- Microshogi
- Kyoto shogi
- Cannon shogi
- Yari shogi
- Whale shogi
