= Kyoto shogi =

Modern variant of shogi

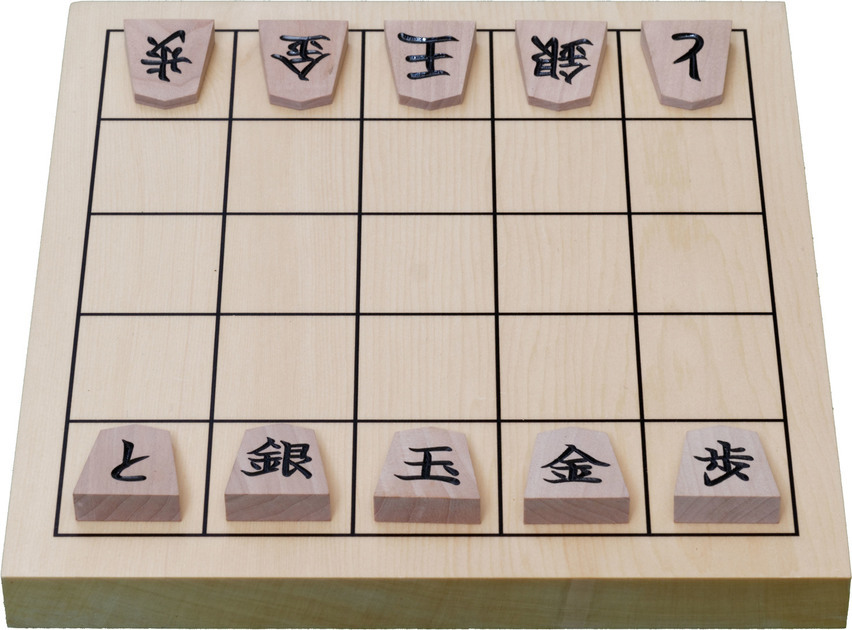
Kyoto shogi with initial setup

Kyoto shogi (京都将棋, kyōto shōgi; "Kyoto chess") is a modern variant of shogi (Japanese chess). It was invented by Tamiya Katsuya c. 1976.

Kyoto shogi is played like standard shogi, but with a reduced number of pieces on a 5×5 board. However, the pieces alternately promote and demote with every move, and the promotion values are entirely different from standard shogi. It is weakly solved as a first player win.

== Rules of the game ==
=== Game equipment ===
Two players play on a board ruled into a grid of 5 ranks (rows) by 5 files (columns). The squares are undifferentiated by marking or color.

Each player has a set of 5 wedge-shaped pieces, of slightly different sizes. From largest to smallest (most to least powerful) they are:

- 1 king
- 1 gold general
- 1 silver general
- 1 tokin
- 1 pawn

| Piece | Kanji | Rōmaji |
|---|---|---|
| King (reigning) | 王将 | ōshō |
| King (challenging) | 玉将 | gyokushō |
| Rook/pawn | 飛歩 | hifu |
| Silver-general/bishop | 銀角 | ginkaku |
| Gold-general/knight | 金桂 | kinkei |
| Lance/tokin | 香と | kyōto |

The names of the pieces combine their promoted and unpromoted values, and are puns in Japanese for words with the same pronunciations but different kanji. For example, the lance/tokin is homonymous with the name of the city 京都 Kyoto, and provides the name of the game.

=== Setup ===
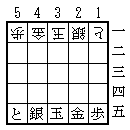
Setup

| 5 | 4 | 3 | 2 | 1 |
|---|---|---|---|---|---|
| 歩 | 金 | 王 | 銀 | と | 一 |
| | | | | | 二 |
| | | | | | 三 |
| | | | | | 四 |
| と | 銀 | 玉 | 金 | 歩 | 五 |

| 5 | 4 | 3 | 2 | 1 |
|---|---|---|---|---|---|
| P | G | K | S | T | a |
| | | | | | b |
| | | | | | c |
| | | | | | d |
| T | S | K | G | P | e |

Each side places his pieces in the positions shown below, pointing toward the opponent.

- In the rank nearest the player:
  - The king (K) is placed in the center file.
  - The gold general (G) is placed in the adjacent files to the right of the king.
  - The silver general (S) is placed in the adjacent files to the left of the king.
  - The tokin (T) is placed in the left corner.
  - The pawn (P) is placed in the right corner.

That is, the first rank is:

| T | S | K | G | P |

=== Promotion ===
There is no promotion zone in Kyoto shogi. Every time a piece makes a move it alternately promotes and reverts to its unpromoted state. Promotion is effected by turning the piece over after it moves, revealing the name of its promoted rank; demotion is effected by turning the piece back.

The promotion rules and values are reminiscent of microshogi and entirely different from standard shogi:

- A king cannot promote: K
- A tokin (T) promotes to a lance and vice versa: T ↔ L
- A silver general promotes to a bishop and vice versa: S ↔ B
- A gold general promotes to a knight and vice versa: G ↔ N
- A pawn promotes to a rook and vice versa: P ↔ R

=== Movement and capture ===
A piece is allowed to move, capture or be dropped in a manner that will prevent it from moving on a subsequent turn, which is illegal in standard shogi. For example, a rook can move onto the farthest rank, becoming a pawn and unable to move further. Such pieces may be captured as any other.

=== Drops ===
A captured piece may be dropped with either side facing up. There are no restrictions on where pieces can be dropped, other than that the square must be empty. So unlike in regular Shogi, pieces can be dropped in places where they can never move again, pawns can be dropped in files that already contain a pawn, and checkmate can be delivered through a pawn drop.

=== Repetition ===
The original rules states that a third repetition would end the game as a draw, but kept open the possibility that this should be changed if playing experience would reveal it as undesirable. An alternative would be to declare a loss for the player repeating a position too many times, except in cases of perpetual check, where the checker would lose.

== See also ==
- Shogi variant
- Whale shogi
- Minishogi
- Judkins shogi
- Microshogi
- Cannon shogi
- Yari shogi
