= Dragonfly (chess variant) =

Chess variant played on a 7×7 board

	a	b	c	d	e	f	g
7	a7 black rook	b7 black bishop	c7 black bishop	d7 black king	e7 black knight	f7 black knight	g7 black rook	7
6	a6 black pawn	b6 black pawn	c6 black pawn	d6 black pawn	e6 black pawn	f6 black pawn	g6 black pawn	6
5	a5	b5	c5	d5	e5	f5	g5	5
4	a4	b4	c4	d4	e4	f4	g4	4
3	a3	b3	c3	d3	e3	f3	g3	3
2	a2 white pawn	b2 white pawn	c2 white pawn	d2 white pawn	e2 white pawn	f2 white pawn	g2 white pawn	2
1	a1 white rook	b1 white bishop	c1 white bishop	d1 white king	e1 white knight	f1 white knight	g1 white rook	1
	a	b	c	d	e	f	g

Dragonfly 7×7 starting setup

Dragonfly (also known as Shuttle Chess or Bird Chess) is a chess variant invented by Christian Freeling in 1983. There are no queens, and a captured bishop, knight, or rook becomes the property of the capturer, who may play it as their own on a turn to any open square. The board is 7×7 squares, or alternatively a 61-cell hexagon with two additional pawns per side.

The game is an offshoot and simplification of a Freeling game named Loonybird (or Dragon Chess). Still, "Play is complex and interesting. Draws are rare too." (Wood 1994:94)

== Game rules ==
The standard rules of chess apply, including winning by checkmate. But Dragonfly follows these special rules:

- A bishop, knight, or rook that is captured enters the capturing player's pieces in hand in their own color. As a move, a player may drop any one of the pieces they have in hand on any open square (if the move is otherwise legal). Captured pawns do not go in hand and are instead removed from the game.
- Pawns do not have an initial double-step option. (So, en passant is not possible.) A pawn promotes when reaching the furthest rank to any piece of the player's choosing from those currently held in hand by their opponent. (If the opponent has none, then a pawn move to the furthest rank may not be made.) The chosen piece is removed from the opponent's in-hand stock.
- Castling is permitted, and normal castling conventions apply, with the king shifting over two squares in either direction. But castling with a dropped rook is not allowed.

== Dragonfly hex ==
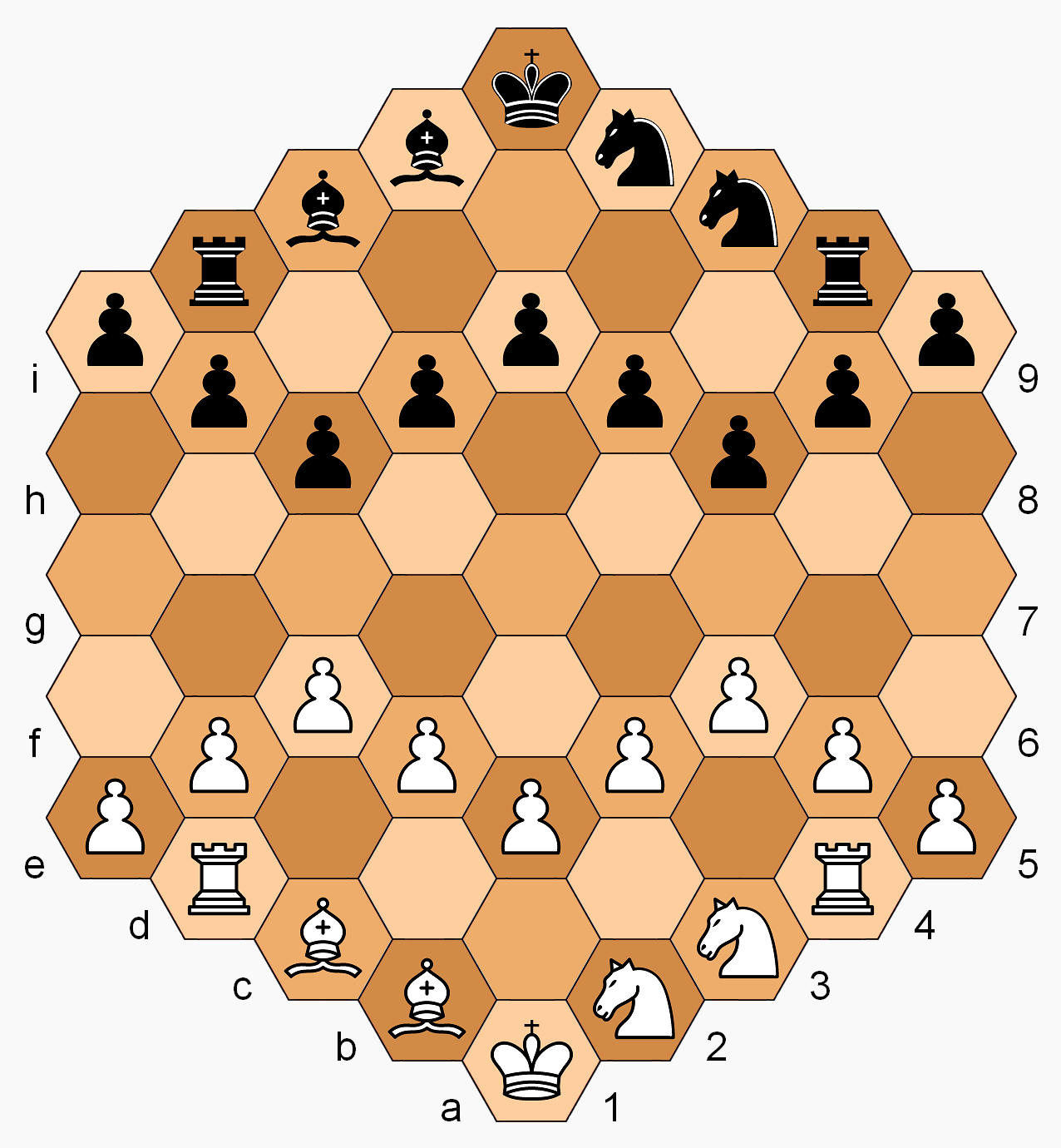
Dragonfly hex starting setup

Dragonfly on the hex board is played the same as Dragonfly 7×7, except that pieces move and capture as in Gliński's hexagonal chess (with the exceptions that pawns have no initial double-step option, and castling is permitted).

== See also ==
- Crazyhouse
- Hexshogi
- Shogi
- Yari Shogi
