= Yari shogi =

Yari shogi (槍将棋 yari shōgi, spear chess, where 'spear' is another name for the lance piece) is a modern variant of shogi (Japanese chess); however, it is not Japanese. It was invented in 1981 by Christian Freeling of the Netherlands. This game accentuates shogi’s intrinsically forward range of direction by giving most of the pieces the ability to move any number of free squares orthogonally forward like a shogi lance. The opposite is true of promoted pieces which can move backward with the same power.

== Rules of the game ==
=== Objective ===
The objective of the game is to capture your opponent's general.

=== Game equipment ===
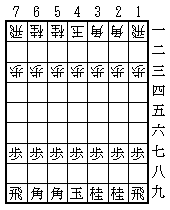
Setup

Two players, Black and White (or 先手 sente and 後手 gote), play on a board ruled into a grid of 9 ranks (rows) by 7 files (columns). The squares are undifferentiated by markings or color.

Each player has a set of 14 wedge-shaped pieces, of slightly different sizes. From largest to smallest (most to least powerful) they are:

- 1 general
- 2 yari rooks
- 2 yari bishops
- 2 yari knights
- 7 pawns

Most of the English names were chosen to correspond to rough equivalents in Western chess, rather than as translations of the Japanese names.

Each piece has its name in the form of two kanji written on its face. On the reverse side of some pieces are one or two other characters, often in a different color (commonly red instead of black); this reverse side is turned up to indicate that the piece has been promoted during play. The pieces of the two sides do not differ in color, but instead each piece is shaped like a wedge, and faces forward, toward the opposing side. This shows who controls the piece during play.

==== Table of pieces ====
Listed here are the pieces of the game with their Japanese representation:

Piece	Kanji	Rōmaji	Hiragana	Meaning
General	将	shō	しょう	general
Yari rook	香飛[車]	kyō hi[sha]	きょうひ[しゃ]	incense flying chariot
Rook	飛[車]	hi[sha]	ひ[しゃ]	flying chariot
Yari bishop	香角[行]	kyō kaku[gyō]	きょうかく[ぎょう]	incense angle mover
Yari gold	成香角[行]	narikyō kaku[gyō]	なりきょうかく[ぎょう]	promoted incense angle mover
Yari knight	香桂[馬]	kyō kei[ma]	きょうけい[ま]	incense laurelled horse
Yari gold	成香桂	narikyō kei	なりきょうけい	promoted incense laurel
Pawn	歩[兵]	fu[hyō]	ふ[ひょう]	foot soldier
Yari silver	香銀[将]	kyō gin[shō]	きょうきん[しょう]	incense silver general

=== Setup ===
7	6	5	4	3	2	1
飛 車	桂 馬	桂 馬	王将	角 行	角 行	飛 車	一
							二
歩 兵	歩 兵	歩 兵	歩 兵	歩 兵	歩 兵	歩 兵	三
							四
							五
							六
歩 兵	歩 兵	歩 兵	歩 兵	歩 兵	歩 兵	歩 兵	七
							八
飛 車	角 行	角 行	王将	桂 馬	桂 馬	飛 車	九

7	6	5	4	3	2	1
YR	YN	YN	G	YB	YB	YR	a
							b
P	P	P	P	P	P	P	c
							d
							e
							f
P	P	P	P	P	P	P	g
							h
YR	YB	YB	G	YN	YN	YR	i

Each side places his pieces in the positions shown, pointing toward the opponent.

- In the rank nearest the player:
  - The general is placed in the center file.
  - The two yari bishops are placed in the adjacent two files to left of the general.
  - The two yari knights are placed in the two adjacent files to the right of the general.
  - The two yari rooks are placed in the far corners.

That is, the first rank is:

YR	YB	YB	G	YN	YN	YR

- In the third rank, the seven pawns are placed one in each file.

=== Gameplay ===
The players alternate making a move, with Black moving first. (The traditional terms 'black' and 'white' are used to differentiate the sides during discussion of the game, but are not literally descriptive.) A move consists of moving a single piece on the board and potentially promoting that piece, displacing (capturing) an opposing piece or dropping a captured piece onto an empty square of the board. Each of these options is detailed below.

=== Movement and capture ===
An opposing piece is captured by displacement: That is, if a piece moves to a square occupied by an opposing piece, the opposing piece is displaced and removed from the board. A piece cannot move to a square occupied by a friendly piece (meaning another piece controlled by the moving player).

Each piece on the game moves in a characteristic pattern. Pieces move either orthogonally (that is, forward, backward, left, or right, in the direction of one of the arms of a plus sign, +), or diagonally (in the direction of one of the arms of a multiplication sign, ×). The knight is an exception, in that it is not required to move in a straight line.

If a piece that cannot retreat or move aside advances across the board until it can no longer move, it must promote. This applies to the pawn, yari knight, yari bishop and yari rook upon reaching the farthest rank, and to the yari knight upon reaching either of the two farthest ranks.

Many pieces are capable of several kinds of movement, with the type of movement most often depending on the direction in which they move. The movement categories are:

==== Step movers ====
The king and pawn move only one square at a time. (If a friendly piece occupies an adjacent square, the moving piece may not move in that direction; if an opposing piece is there, it may be displaced and captured.)

==== Jumping piece ====
The yari knight can jump, that is, it can pass over any intervening piece, whether friend or foe, with no effect on either.

==== Ranging pieces ====
Many pieces can move any number of empty squares along a straight line, limited only by the edge of the board. If an opposing piece intervenes, it may be captured by moving to that square and removing it from the board. A ranging piece must stop where it captures, and cannot bypass a piece that is in its way. If a friendly piece intervenes, the moving piece is limited to a distance that stops short of the intervening piece; if the friendly piece is adjacent, it cannot move in that direction at all.

The ranging pieces are the yari rook, yari bishop and yari knight.

=== Promotion ===
A player's promotion zone consists of the three farthest ranks, at the original line of the opponent's pawns and beyond (that is, the opponent's territory at setup). If a piece crosses the board within the promotion zone, including moves into, out of, or wholly within the zone, but not including drops (see below), then that player may choose to promote the piece at the end of the turn. Promotion is effected by turning the piece over after it moves, revealing the name of its promoted rank.

Promoting a piece has the effect of changing how that piece moves until it is removed from the board. Each piece promotes as follows:

- A general cannot promote, nor can pieces which are already promoted.
- A yari bishop or yari knight loses its normal movement and gains the ability to move one square orthogonally forward or sideways, diagonally forward and any number of free squares orthogonally backward.
- A pawn, when promoted, keeps its normal movement and gains the ability to move one square diagonally forward or any number of free squares backward.
- A yari rook, when promoted, keeps its normal movement and gains the ability to move any number of free squares backward.

If a yari bishop, yari knight or pawn reaches the farthest rank, it must be promoted, since it would otherwise have no legal move on subsequent turns. When captured, pieces lose their promoted status.

=== Individual pieces ===
Below are diagrams indicating each piece's movement. Pieces are paired with their promotion. Pieces with a grey heading start out in the game; those with a blue heading only appear on the board after promotion. Betza's funny notation has been included in brackets for easier reference.

Notation
○	Steps to an adjacent square
☆	Jumps to a non-adjacent square, bypassing any intervening piece
│	Ranges along a straight line, crossing any number of empty squares
─	Ranges along a straight line, crossing any number of empty squares

General			
Step: The general can step one square in any direction, orthogonal or diagonal. (K)	○ / ○ / ○; ○ / 将 / ○; ○ / ○ / ○	The general is the "royal" or "objective" piece.	
Yari Knight		Yari Gold	
Jump: The yari knight jumps at an angle intermediate between orthogonal and diagonal, amounting to one square forward plus one square diagonally forward, in a single motion, ignoring any intervening piece; or, Range: It can move any number of free squares straight forward. (fRffN) A yari knight that reaches the farthest rank must promote.	☆ / │ / ☆; / │; / 桂	Range: The yari gold can move any number of free squares directly backward. Step: It can step one square directly forward or sideways; or, one square diagonally forward. (WfFbR)	○ / ○ / ○; ○ / 成 / ○; / │; / │
Yari Rook		Rook	
Range: The yari rook can move any number of free squares orthogonally forward or sideways. (frlR)	/ / │; / / │; ─ / ─ / 飛 / ─ / ─	Range: The rook can move any number of free squares along any of the four orthogonal directions. (R)	/ / │; / / │; ─ / ─ / 成 / ─ / ─; / / │; / / │
Yari Bishop		Yari Gold	
Range: The yari bishop can move any number of free squares directly forward; or, Step: It can move one square diagonally forward. (fFfR) A yari bishop that reaches the farthest rank must promote.	/ │; ○ / │ / ○; / 角	Range: The yari gold can move any number of free squares directly backward. Step: It can step one square directly forward or sideways; or, one square diagonally forward. (WfFbR)	○ / ○ / ○; ○ / 成 / ○; / │; / │
Pawn		Yari Silver	
Step: The pawn can step one square forward. (fW) A pawn that reaches the farthest rank must promote. There are restrictive rules for where a pawn may be dropped (see below).	○; 歩	Range: The yari silver can move any number of free squares directly backward; or, Step: It can move one square forward, orthogonally or diagonally. (fKbR)	○ / ○ / ○; / 銀; / │; / │

=== Drops ===
Captured pieces are truly captured in yari shogi. They are retained "in hand", and can be brought back into play under the capturing player's control. On any turn, instead of moving a piece across the board, a player can take a piece he has previously captured and place it on any empty square, facing the opponent. The piece is now part of the forces controlled by that player. This is termed dropping the piece, or just a drop.

A drop cannot capture a piece; that requires an additional move.

Pieces that are dropped in the promotion zone do not promote as a result: Promotion requires that piece make a normal movement on a subsequent turn, as detailed under "Promotion", above. Pieces that are promoted when captured lose that promotion; they are unpromoted when dropped back on the board.

A pawn, yari knight, or yari bishop may not be dropped on the farthest rank, since it would have no legal move on subsequent turns.

A pawn cannot be dropped into the same file (vertical column) as another unpromoted pawn controlled by the same player. (A yari silver, or promoted pawn, does not count as a pawn when considering this drop restriction.) A player who has an unpromoted pawn on every file is therefore unable to drop a pawn anywhere. For this reason, it is common to sacrifice a pawn in order to gain flexibility for drops.

Unlike shogi, a pawn can be dropped when the opponent would have no way to prevent his general being captured on the next move. In other words, a pawn can be dropped to give immediate mate.

=== Check and mate ===
When a player makes a move such that the opponent's general could be captured on the following move, the move is said to give check to the general; the general is said to be in check. If a player's general is in check and no legal move by that player will get the general out of check, the checking move is also a mate, and effectively wins the game.

A player is not allowed to give perpetual check.

=== Game end ===
A player who captures the opponent's general wins the game. In practice this rarely happens, as a player will resign when checkmated, as otherwise when loss is inevitable.

A player who makes an illegal move loses immediately. (This rule may be relaxed in casual games.)

There are two other possible (but fairly uncommon) ways for a game to end: repetition (千日手 sennichite) and impasse (持将棋 jishōgi).

If the same position occurs three times with the same player to play, then the game is no contest. (Recall, however, the prohibition against perpetual check.) For two positions to be considered the same, the pieces in hand must be the same, as well as the position on the board.

The game reaches an impasse if both generals have advanced into their respective promotion zones and neither player can hope to mate the other or to gain any further material. If this happens then the winner is decided as follows: each yari rook or yari bishop scores 5 points for the owning player, and all other pieces (except generals) score 1 point each. Promotions are ignored for the purposes of scoring. A player scoring less than 26 points loses. If both players have at least 26 points, then the game is no contest.

Games which are no contest are counted as draws in tournament style games.

== Handicaps ==
Games between players of disparate strength are often played with handicaps. In a handicap game, one or more of White's pieces is removed before the start of play, and White plays the first move of the game. Note that the pieces removed at the beginning play no further part in the game - they are not available for drops. The imbalance created by this method of handicapping is not as strong as it is in chess, because material advantage is not as powerful in yari shogi as in chess.

Common handicaps, in increasing order of size, are as follows:

- Remove White's left yari bishop
- Remove White's left yari rook
- Two pieces: remove White's left yari rook and left yari bishop
- Four pieces: remove White's yari rooks and yari bishops
- Six pieces: remove White's yari rooks, yari bishops and yari knights

Other handicaps are also occasionally used. The relationship between handicaps and differences in rank is not universally agreed upon.

== Game notation ==
The method used in English-language texts to express shogi moves was established by George Hodges in 1976. It is derived from the algebraic notation used for chess, but differs in several respects. It has been modified for use in yari shogi.

A typical example is P-7f. The first letter represents the piece moved: P = pawn, YN = yari knight, YB = yari bishop, YR = yari rook, G = general. Promoted pieces have a + added in front of the letter. e.g., +P for a yari silver (promoted pawn). The designation of the piece is followed by a symbol indicating the type of move: - for an ordinary move, x for a capture, or * for a drop. Next is the designation for the square on which the piece lands. This consists of a number representing the file and a lowercase letter representing the rank, with 1a being the top right corner (as seen from Black's point of view) and 7i being the bottom left corner. (This method of designating squares is based on Japanese convention, which, however, uses Japanese numerals instead of letters. For example, the square 2c is denoted by 2三 in Japanese.)

If a move entitles the player to promote the piece, then a + is added to the end to signify that the promotion was taken, or an = to indicate that it was declined. For example, YNx7c= indicates a yari knight capturing on 7c without promoting.

In cases where the above notation would be ambiguous, the designation of the start square is added after the designation for the piece in order to make clear which piece is meant. For example, in the initial position Black has two yari bishops which can be moved to the square 5h, and these are distinguished as YB6i-5h (moving the left one) and YB5i-5h (moving the right one).

Moves are commonly numbered as in chess. For example, the start of a game might look like this:

    1. P-7f   P-3d
    2. P-2f   YB-3b

In handicap games White plays first, so Black's move 1 is replaced by an ellipsis.

== Strategy and tactics ==
Drops are the most serious departure from Western chess. They entail a different strategy, with a strong defensive position being much more important. A quick offense will leave a player's home territory open to drop attacks as soon as pieces are exchanged. Because pawns attack head on, and cannot defend each other, they tend to be lost early in the game, providing ammunition for such attacks. Dropping a pawn behind enemy lines, promoting, and dropping a second pawn behind it so they protect each other is a strong attack; it threatens the opponent's entire defense, but provides little of value if the attack fails and the pieces are captured.

Players raised on Western chess often make poor use of drops, and dropping is half the game. If a player has more than a couple of captured pieces in hand, it is likely that dropping attacks are being overlooked. However, it is wise to keep a pawn in hand, and often to exchange pieces if necessary to get one.

Attacking pieces can easily become trapped behind enemy lines, as the opponent can often drop a pawn in a protected square to cut off a line of retreat. For this reason, yari rooks are commonly kept at a safe distance in the early parts of the game, and are used to support attacks by weaker pieces.

There are various ranging yari rook openings, where the yari rook moves to the center or left of the board to support an attack. However, as the most powerful piece on the board it invites attack, and it is a good idea to keep your general well away from your yari rook.

Advancing a yari rook pawn can open up the side of the board for attack. Therefore, when a player first advances a yari rook pawn, it is usual for the opponent to answer by advancing the opposing pawn, in order to avoid complications later in the game.

== See also ==
- Shogi variant
- Tori shogi
- Minishogi
- Judkins shogi
- Microshogi
- Kyoto shogi
- Cannon shogi
- Dragonfly
