= Judkins shogi =

Judkins shogi (ジャドケンス将棋 Jadokensu shōgi "Judkins shogi") is a modern variant of shogi (Japanese chess), however it is not Japanese. Credit for its invention has been given to Paul Judkins of Norwich, UK, prior to April 1998.

== Rules of the game ==
=== Objective ===
The objective of the game is to capture your opponent's king.

=== Game equipment ===
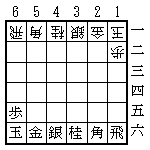
Setup

Two players, Black and White (or 先手 sente and 後手 gote), play on a board ruled into a grid of 6 ranks (rows) by 6 files (columns). The squares are undifferentiated by marking or color.

Each player has a set of 7 wedge-shaped pieces, of slightly different sizes. From largest to smallest (most to least powerful) they are:

- 1 king
- 1 rook
- 1 bishop
- 1 gold general
- 1 silver general
- 1 knight
- 1 pawn

Most of the English-language names are chosen to correspond to rough equivalents in Western chess, rather than as translations of the Japanese names.

Each piece has its name in the form of two kanji written on its face. On the reverse side of some pieces are one or two other characters, often in a different color (commonly red instead of black); this reverse side is turned up to indicate that the piece has been promoted during play. The pieces of the two sides do not differ in color, but instead each piece is shaped like a wedge, and faces forward, toward the opposing side. This shows who controls the piece during play.

==== Table of pieces ====
Listed here are the pieces of the game with their Japanese representation:

| Piece | Kanji | Rōmaji | Unicode | Hiragana | Meaning |
|---|---|---|---|---|---|
| King (reigning) | 王[将] | ō[shō] | 738b [5c06] | おう[しょう] | king |
| King (challenging) | 玉[将] | gyoku[shō] | 7389 [5c06] | ぎょく[しょう] | jade general |
| Rook | 飛[車] | hi[sha] | 98db [8eca] | ひ[しゃ] | flying chariot |
| Promoted rook | 竜[王] | ryū[ō] | 7adc [738b] | りゅう[おう] | dragon king |
| Bishop | 角[行] | kaku[gyō] | 89d2 [884c] | かく[ぎょう] | angle mover |
| Promoted bishop | [竜]馬 | uma (ryūma) | [7adc] 99ac | うま (りゅうま) | dragon horse |
| Gold general | 金[将] | kin[shō] | 91d1 [5c06] | きん[しょう] | gold general |
| Silver general | 銀[将] | gin[shō] | 9280 [5c06] | ぎん[しょう] | silver general |
| Promoted silver | 成銀 | narigin | 6210 9280 | なりぎん | promoted silver |
| Knight | 桂[馬] | kei[ma] | 6842 [99ac] | けい[ま] | laurelled horse |
| Promoted knight | 成桂 | narikei | 6210 6842 | なりけい | promoted laurel |
| Pawn | 歩[兵] | fu[hyō] | 6b69 [5175] | ふ[ひょう] | foot soldier |
| Promoted pawn | と[金] | to[kin] | 3068 [91d1] | と[きん] | reaches gold |

English speakers sometimes refer to promoted bishops as horses and promoted rooks as dragons, after their Japanese names, and generally use the Japanese name tokin for promoted pawns. Silver generals and gold generals are commonly referred to simply as silvers and golds.

The characters inscribed on the backs of the pieces to indicate promoted rank may be in red ink, and are usually cursive. The characters on the backs of the pieces that promote to gold generals are cursive versions of 金 'gold', becoming more cursive (more abbreviated) as the value of the original piece decreases. These abbreviated characters have these equivalents in print: 全 for promoted silver, 今 for promoted knight, and 个 for promoted pawn (tokin). Another convention has abbreviated versions of the original characters, with a reduced number of strokes: 圭 for promoted knight, with promoted silver the same 全 as above, and と for tokin.

=== Setup ===
| 6 | 5 | 4 | 3 | 2 | 1 |
|---|---|---|---|---|---|---|
| 飛 車 | 角 行 | 桂 馬 | 銀 将 | 金 将 | 王 将 | 一 |
| | | | | | 歩 兵 | 二 |
| | | | | | | 三 |
| | | | | | | 四 |
| 歩 兵 | | | | | | 五 |
| 玉 将 | 金 将 | 銀 将 | 桂 馬 | 角 行 | 飛 車 | 六 |

| 6 | 5 | 4 | 3 | 2 | 1 |
|---|---|---|---|---|---|---|
| R | B | N | S | G | K | a |
| | | | | | P | b |
| | | | | | | c |
| | | | | | | d |
| P | | | | | | e |
| K | G | S | N | B | R | f |

Each side places his pieces in the positions shown below, pointing toward the opponent.

- In the rank nearest the player:
  - The king is placed in the left corner file.
  - The gold general is placed in the adjacent file to the king.
  - The silver general is placed adjacent to the gold general.
  - The knight is placed adjacent to the silver general.
  - The bishop is placed adjacent to the knight.
  - The rook is placed adjacent to the bishop in the right corner.

That is, the first rank is |K|G|S|N|B|R|.

- In the second rank, each player places the pawn in the same file as the king on the far left side.

=== Game play ===
The players alternate making a move, with Black moving first. (The traditional terms 'black' and 'white' are used to differentiate the sides during discussion of the game, but are not literally descriptive.) A move consists of moving a single piece on the board and potentially promoting that piece, displacing (capturing) an opposing piece or dropping a captured piece onto an empty square of the board. Each of these options is detailed below.

=== Movement and capture ===
An opposing piece is captured by displacement: That is, if a piece moves to a square occupied by an opposing piece, the opposing piece is displaced and removed from the board. A piece cannot move to a square occupied by a friendly piece (meaning another piece controlled by the moving player).

Each piece on the game moves in a characteristic pattern. Pieces move either orthogonally (that is, forward, backward, left, or right, in the direction of one of the arms of a plus sign, +), or diagonally (in the direction of one of the arms of a multiplication sign, ×). The knight is an exception in that it does not move in a straight line.

The movement categories are:

==== Step movers ====
Some pieces move only one square at a time. (If a friendly piece occupies an adjacent square, the moving piece may not move in that direction; if an opposing piece is there, it may be displaced and captured.)

The step movers are the king, gold general, silver general and pawn.

==== Jumping piece ====
The knight can jump, that is, it can pass over any intervening piece, whether friend or foe, with no effect on either.

==== Ranging pieces ====
The bishop and rook can move any number of empty squares along a straight line, limited only by the edge of the board. If an opposing piece intervenes, it may be captured by moving to that square and removing it from the board. A ranging piece must stop where it captures, and cannot bypass a piece that is in its way. If a friendly piece intervenes, the moving piece is limited to a distance that stops short of the intervening piece; if the friendly piece is adjacent, it cannot move in that direction at all.

=== Promotion ===
A player's promotion zone consists of the two farthest ranks, at the original line of the opponent's pawn and beyond (that is, the opponent's territory at setup). If a piece crosses the board within the promotion zone, including moves into, out of, or wholly within the zone, but not including drops (see below), then that player may choose to promote the piece at the end of the turn. Promotion is effected by turning the piece over after it moves, revealing the name of its promoted rank.

Promoting a piece has the effect of changing how that piece moves until it is removed from the board. Each piece promotes as follows:

- A king or gold general cannot promote, nor can pieces which are already promoted.
- A silver general, knight or pawn, when promoted, loses its normal movement and gains the movement of a gold general.
- A bishop or rook, when promoted, keeps its normal movement and gains the ability to move one square in any direction (like a king). This means the bishop is now able to reach any square on the board, given enough moves.

If a pawn or knight reaches the furthest rank, it must be promoted, since it would otherwise have no legal move on subsequent turns. For the same reason, a knight reaching the penultimate rank must be promoted.

When captured, pieces lose their promoted status.

=== Individual pieces ===
Following are diagrams that indicate the movement of each piece. Pieces are pared with their promotion and those with a grey heading start out in the game; promoted pieces have a blue heading. Betza's funny notation has been included in brackets for easier reference.

Notation
| ○ | Steps to an adjacent square |
| ☆ | Jumps to a non-adjacent square, bypassing any intervening piece |
| │ | Ranges along a straight line, crossing any number of empty squares |
| ─ | Ranges along a straight line, crossing any number of empty squares |
| ╲ | Ranges along a straight line, crossing any number of empty squares |
| ╱ | Ranges along a straight line, crossing any number of empty squares |

King (reigning)
King (challenging)
Step: The king can step one square in any direction, orthogonal or diagonal. (K)

The king general goes to the superior player.

| ○ | ○ | ○ |
| ○ | 王 | ○ |
| ○ | ○ | ○ |

Step: The king can step one square in any direction, orthogonal or diagonal. (K)

The jeweled general goes to the inferior player.

| ○ | ○ | ○ |
| ○ | 玉 | ○ |
| ○ | ○ | ○ |

Gold General

Step: The gold general can step one square in one of the four orthogonal directions; or, one square diagonally forward, giving it six possibilities. (WfF)

| ○ | ○ | ○ |
| ○ | 金 | ○ |
| | ○ | |

The gold general does not promote.
Silver General
Promoted Silver
Step: The silver general can step one square in one of the four diagonal directions; or, one square straight forward, giving it five possibilities. (FfW)

| ○ | ○ | ○ |
| | 銀 | |
| ○ | | ○ |

Step: The promoted silver can step one square in one of the four orthogonal directions; or, one square diagonally forward, giving it six possibilities. (WfF)

| ○ | ○ | ○ |
| ○ | 全 | ○ |
| | ○ | |

Knight
Promoted Knight
Jump: The knight jumps at an angle intermediate between orthogonal and diagonal, amounting to one square forward plus one square diagonally forward, in a single motion, ignoring any intervening piece. That is, it has a choice of two forward destinations. (ffN)

A knight that reaches one of the two farthest ranks must promote.

| ☆ | | ☆ |
| | 桂 | |

Step: The promoted knight can step one square in one of the four orthogonal directions; or, one square diagonally forward, giving it six possibilities. (WfF)

| ○ | ○ | ○ |
| ○ | 圭 | ○ |
| | ○ | |

Bishop
Dragon Horse
Range: The bishop can move any number of free squares along any of the four diagonal directions. (B)

Because it cannot move orthogonally, an unpromoted bishop can only reach half the squares on the board.

| ╲ | | | | ╱ |
| | ╲ | | ╱ | |
| | | 角 | | |
| | ╱ | | ╲ | |
| ╱ | | | | ╲ |

Range: The dragon horse can move any number of free squares along any of the four diagonal directions.

Step: It can step one square in any of the four orthogonal directions. (WB)

| ╲ | | | | ╱ |
| | ╲ | ○ | ╱ | |
| | ○ | 馬 | ○ | |
| | ╱ | ○ | ╲ | |
| ╱ | | | | ╲ |

Rook
Dragon King
Range: The rook can move any number of free squares along any of the four orthogonal directions. (R)

| | | │ | | |
| | | │ | | |
| ─ | ─ | 飛 | ─ | ─ |
| | | │ | | |
| | | │ | | |

Range: The dragon king can move any number of free squares along any of the four orthogonal directions.

Step: It can step one square in any of the four diagonal directions. (FR)

| | | │ | | |
| | ○ | │ | ○ | |
| ─ | ─ | 竜 | ─ | ─ |
| | ○ | │ | ○ | |
| | | │ | | |

Pawn
Tokin
Step: The pawn can step one square forward. (fW)

A pawn that reaches the farthest rank must promote. There are restrictive rules for where a pawn may be dropped (see below).

| ○ |
| 歩 |

Step: The tokin can step one square in one of the four orthogonal directions; or, one square diagonally forward, giving it six possibilities. (WfF)

| ○ | ○ | ○ |
| ○ | と | ○ |
| | ○ | |

=== Drops ===
Captured pieces are truly captured in Judkins shogi. They are retained "in hand", and can be brought back into play under the capturing player's control. On any turn, instead of moving a piece across the board, a player can take a piece he has previously captured and place it on any empty square, facing the opponent. The piece is now part of the forces controlled by that player. This is termed dropping the piece, or just a drop.

A drop cannot capture a piece; that requires an additional move.

Pieces that are dropped in the promotion zone do not promote as a result: Promotion requires that piece make a normal movement on a subsequent turn, as detailed under "Promotion", above. Pieces that are promoted when captured lose that promotion; they are unpromoted when dropped back on the board.

A pawn or knight may not be dropped on the furthest rank, since it would have no legal move on subsequent turns. Similarly, a knight may not be dropped on the penultimate rank.

There are two restrictions when dropping pawns:

A pawn cannot be dropped into the same file (vertical column) as another unpromoted pawn controlled by the same player. (A tokin, or promoted pawn, does not count as a pawn when considering this drop restriction.)

A pawn cannot be dropped directly in front of the opponent's king, if the opponent would have no way to prevent his king being captured on the next move. In other words, a pawn cannot be dropped to give immediate mate.

=== Check and mate ===
When a player makes a move, such that the opponent's king could be captured on the following move, the move is said to give check to the king; the king is said to be in check. If a player's king is in check and no legal move by that player will get it out of check, the checking move is also mate, and effectively wins the game.

A player is not allowed to give perpetual check.

=== Game end ===
A player who captures the opponent's king wins the game. In practice this rarely happens, as a player will resign when checkmated, as otherwise when loss is inevitable.

A player who makes an illegal move loses immediately. (This rule may be relaxed in casual games.)

There are two other possible (but fairly uncommon) ways for a game to end: repetition (千日手 sennichite) and impasse (持将棋 jishōgi). If the same position occurs four times with the same player to play, then the game is no contest. Recall, however, the prohibition against perpetual check. For two positions to be considered the same, the pieces in hand must be the same, as well as the position on the board.

The game reaches an impasse if both kings have advanced into their respective promotion zones and neither player can hope to mate the other or to gain any further material. If this happens then the winner is decided as follows: each rook or bishop scores 5 points for the owning player, and all other pieces (except kings) score 1 point each. Promotions are ignored for the purposes of scoring. A player scoring less than 12 points loses. If both players have at least 12 points, then the game is no contest.

Games which are no contest are usually counted as draws in amateur tournaments, but in professional style tournaments the rules may require the game to be replayed with colors reversed (possibly with reduced time limits).

== Handicaps ==
Games between players of disparate strength are often played with handicaps. In a handicap game, one or more of White's pieces is removed before the start of play, and White plays the first move of the game. Note that the pieces removed at the beginning play no further part in the game — they are not available for drops. The imbalance created by this method of handicapping is not as strong as it is in chess, because material advantage is not as powerful in Judkins shogi as in chess.

Common handicaps, in increasing order of size, are as follows:

- Remove White's bishop
- Remove White's rook
- Two pieces: remove White's rook and bishop

Other handicaps are also occasionally used. The relationship between handicaps and differences in rank is not universally agreed upon.

== Game notation ==
The method used in English-language texts to express shogi moves was established by George Hodges in 1976. It is derived from the algebraic notation used for chess, but differs in several respects. Minor variations are made for Judkins shogi.

A typical example is P-6d. The first letter represents the piece moved: P = pawn, N = knight, S = silver, G = gold, B = bishop, R = rook, K = king. Promoted pieces have a + added in front of the letter. e.g., +P for a tokin (promoted pawn). The designation of the piece is followed by a symbol indicating the type of move: - for an ordinary move, x for a capture, or * for a drop. Next is the designation for the square on which the piece lands. This consists of a number representing the file and a lowercase letter representing the rank, with 1a being the top right corner (as seen from Black's point of view) and 6f being the bottom left corner. (This method of designating squares is based on Japanese convention, which, however, uses Japanese numerals instead of letters. For example, the square 2c is denoted by 2三 in Japanese.)

If a move entitles the player to promote the piece, then a + is added to the end to signify that the promotion was taken, or an = to indicate that it was declined. For example, Nx5c= indicates a knight capturing on 5c without promoting.

In cases where the above notation would be ambiguous, the designation of the start square is added after the designation for the piece in order to make clear which piece is meant. For example, if Black has two golds (one was captured and dropped) which can be moved to the square 5e in front of the king, and these are distinguished as C6e-5d (moving the left one) and C4e-5d (moving the right one).

Moves are commonly numbered as in chess. For example, the start of a game might look like this:

    1. P-1c   P-6d
    2. P-1d   P-6c

In handicap games White plays first, so Black's move 1 is replaced by an ellipsis.

== See also ==
- Shogi variant
- Tori shogi
- Minishogi
- Microshogi
- Kyoto shogi
- Cannon shogi
- Yari shogi
