= Micro shogi =

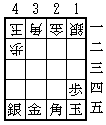
Microshogi

Microshogi (五分摩訶将棋 gofun maka shōgi "5-minute (scarlet) poppy chess") is a modern variant of shogi (Japanese chess), with very different rules for promotion, and demotion. Kerry Handscomb of NOST (Note: NOST (kNights of the Square Table), a (now defunct) correspondence game club formed in 1960 by Bob Lauzon and Jim France, enjoyed several hundred active members.) gave it this English name. Although not confirmed, he credits its invention to the late Oyama Yasuharu, one of the most famous professional shogi players in history. In the mid-1980s, Handscomb was gifted a set custom made by a Japanese craftsman. Therefore, the game must have been invented before this time.

== Equipment ==
Two players play on a board ruled into a grid of 5 ranks (rows) by 4 files (columns). The squares are undifferentiated by marking or color.

Each player has a set of 5 wedge-shaped pieces. The pieces are of slightly different sizes. From largest to smallest (or most to least powerful) they are:

- 1 king
- 1 bishop
- 1 gold general
- 1 silver general
- 1 pawn

The king is blank on the opposite side, the silver has a lance on the opposite side, the gold a rook, the bishop a tokin, and the pawn a knight.

The pieces all move like their shogi equivalents.

== Game rules ==
The game is identical to standard shogi with the following exceptions.

=== Setup ===
4	3	2	1
王 将	角 行	金 将	銀 将	一
歩 兵				二
				三
			歩 兵	四
銀 将	金 将	角 行	玉 将	五

4	3	2	1
K	B	G	S	a
P				b
				c
			P	d
S	G	B	K	e

Each side places his pieces in the following positions, pointing toward the opponent. For more information see the ChessVariants.com page on micro shogi.

- In the rank nearest the player:
  - The king is placed in the right corner
  - The bishop is placed in the adjacent file to the king.
  - The gold general is placed adjacent to the bishop.
  - The silver general is placed adjacent to the gold general in the left corner.

That is, the first rank is |S|G|B|K|.

- In the second rank, each player places the pawn in the same file as the king.

=== Promotion ===
Unlike standard shogi, microshogi has no promotion zone. Instead, a piece promotes when it captures, and promotion is mandatory. When a piece captures, it is flipped over to show the value on the other side.

Promotion values are entirely different from standard shogi:

- A king does not promote: K
- A silver general becomes a lance and vice versa: S ↔ L
- A bishop becomes a tokin (T) and vice versa: B ↔ T
- A gold general becomes a rook and vice versa: G ↔ R
- A pawn becomes a knight and vice versa: P ↔ N

Likewise, when a lance, tokin, rook, or knight makes a capture, it flips back to its former state.

A piece can flip back and forth during the game as it makes captures.

A knight which reaches one of the two far ranks is trapped, as is a pawn which captures and thus promotes there. Likewise, a pawn that reaches the far rank is trapped, as is a knight which captures there. A lance is also trapped at the far rank, but can escape if it captures there and thus promotes to a silver. A silver which captures in the far rank and therefore promotes to a lance is trapped.

Any trapped piece may be captured and returned to play as part of the opposing army.

A tokin moves the same way as a golden general.

=== Drops ===
Drops are similar to standard shogi, except that:

- A player may drop a piece with either side facing up.
- There are no restrictions when dropping. That is, a player may have two unpromoted pawns on the same file, a piece can be dropped with no legal moves later, and a pawn can be dropped to give immediate checkmate.

== See also ==
- Shogi variant
- Tori shogi
- Minishogi
- Judkins shogi
- Kyoto shogi
- Cannon shogi
- Yari shogi
