= Whale Shogi =

Shogi variant invented by R. Wayne Schmittberger in 1981

Whale Shogi (鯨将棋 kujira shōgi) is a modern variant of shogi (Japanese chess). It is not, however, Japanese; it was invented by R. Wayne Schmittberger of the United States in 1981. The game is similar to Judkins shogi but with more pieces, and the pieces are named after types of whale.

== Game rules ==
=== Objective ===
The objective of the game is to capture your opponent's white whale.

=== Game equipment ===
Two players, Black and White (or 先手 sente and 後手 gote), play on a board ruled into a grid of 6 ranks (rows) by 6 files (columns). The squares are undifferentiated by marking or color.

Each player has a set of 12 wedge-shaped pieces, of slightly different sizes. From largest to smallest (most to least powerful) they are:

- 1 white whale (W)
- 1 porpoise (P)
- 1 humpback (H)
- 1 grey whale (G)
- 1 narwhal (N)
- 1 blue whale (B)
- 6 dolphins (D)

Each piece has its initial written on its face. On the reverse side of the porpoise is another letter (K for 'killer whale'), often in a different color (commonly red instead of black); this reverse side is turned up to indicate that the piece has been promoted during play. The pieces of the two sides do not differ in color, but instead each piece is shaped like a wedge, and faces forward, toward the opposing side. This shows who controls the piece during play.

Because this is a Western shogi variant, and kanji for the whales are difficult even for the Japanese, the pieces use Latin letters rather than kanji.

=== Setup ===
a	b	c	d	e	f
B	N	P	W	G	H	6
D	D	D	D	D	D	5
						4
						3
D	D	D	D	D	D	2
H	G	W	P	N	B	1

This is the starting setup of a game of Whale Shogi, from the perspective of Black.

Each side places his pieces in the positions shown below, pointing toward the opponent.

- In the rank nearest the player:
  - The white whale is placed just left of center.
  - The porpoise is placed in the adjacent file to the right of the white whale.
  - The humpback is placed in the left corner.
  - The grey whale is placed between the white whale and the humpback.
  - The narwhal is placed adjacent to the porpoise.
  - The blue whale is placed adjacent to the narwhal in the right corner.

That is, the first rank is:

H	G	W	P	N	B

- In the second rank, the six dolphins are placed one in each file.

=== Gameplay ===
The players alternate turns, with Black moving first. (The traditional terms 'Black' and 'White' are used to differentiate the sides during discussion of the game, but are not literally descriptive.) A move consists of moving a single piece on the board, displacing (capturing) an opposing piece, or dropping a previously captured piece onto an empty square of the board. Each of these options is detailed below.

=== Movement and capture ===
An opposing piece is captured by displacement: That is, if a piece moves to a square occupied by an opposing piece, the opposing piece is displaced and removed from the board. A piece cannot move to a square occupied by a friendly piece (meaning another piece controlled by the moving player).

Each piece on the game moves in a characteristic pattern. Pieces move either orthogonally (that is, forward, backward, left, or right, in the direction of one of the arms of a plus sign, +), or diagonally (in the direction of one of the arms of a multiplication sign, ×).

Some pieces are capable of more than one kind of movement, with the type of movement most often depending on the direction in which they move. The movement categories are:

==== Step movers ====
Some pieces move only one square at a time. (If a friendly piece occupies an adjacent square, the moving piece may not move in that direction; if an opposing piece is there, it may be displaced and captured.)

The step movers are the white whale, porpoise, humpback, narwhal, blue whale and killer whale.

==== Jumping piece ====
The narwhal can jump, that is, it can pass over any intervening piece, whether friend or foe, with no effect on either, but only directly forward.

==== Ranging pieces ====
The grey whale and killer whale can move any number of empty squares along a straight line, limited only by the edge of the board. The dolphin can, too, but only when on the back rank; it is a step mover elsewhere. If an opposing piece intervenes, it may be captured by moving to that square and removing it from the board. A ranging piece must stop where it captures, and cannot bypass a piece that is in its way. If a friendly piece intervenes, the moving piece is limited to a distance that stops short of the intervening piece; if the friendly piece is adjacent, it cannot move in that direction at all.

==== Individual pieces ====
Below are diagrams indicating each piece's movement. Pieces with a grey heading start out in the game; those with a blue heading only appear on the board after promotion. Betza's funny notation has been included in brackets for easier reference.

Notation
○	Steps to an adjacent square
☆	Jumps to a non-adjacent square, bypassing any intervening piece
│	Ranges along a straight line, crossing any number of empty squares
─	Ranges along a straight line, crossing any number of empty squares
╲	Ranges along a straight line, crossing any number of empty squares
╱	Ranges along a straight line, crossing any number of empty squares

White Whale	Grey Whale
○ / ○ / ○; ○ / W / ○; ○ / ○ / ○; Step: The white whale can step one square in any direction, orthogonal or diagonal. (K)	/ / |; / / |; / / G; / ╱ / / ╲; ╱ / / / / ╲; Range: The grey whale can move any number of free squares directly forward or diagonally backward. (fRbB)
Porpoise	Killer Whale
○ / P / ○; Step: The porpoise can move one square orthogonally sideways. (rlW); The porpoise promotes to a killer whale upon capture.	/ / │; / ○ / │ / ○; ─ / ─ / K / ─ / ─; / ○ / │ / ○; / / │; Range: The killer whale can move any number of free squares along any of the four orthogonal directions.; Step: It can move one square in any diagonal direction. (FR); This is the move of the dragon king in other shogi variants.
Narwhal	Humpback
/ ☆; ○ / N / ○; / ○; Jump: The narwhal can jump to the second square directly forward; or, Step: It can move one square directly backward or sideways. (fDrlbW)	○ / / ○; / H; ○ / ○ / ○; Step: The humpback can step one square in one of the four diagonal directions, or directly backward. (FbW); This is the move of the old monkey in maka dai dai shogi.
Blue Whale	Dolphin
○ / ○ / ○; / B; / ○; Step: The blue whale can step one square directly forward or backward, or one square diagonally forward, giving it four possibilities. (fbWfF); This is the move of the copper general in large-size variants.	○; D; / / D; / ╱ / / ╲; ╱ / / / / ╲; Step: The dolphin can step one square forward; or, Range: It can move any number of free squares diagonally backward, but only if it is in the farthest rank. (bB if in farthest rank; otherwise fW)

=== Drops ===
Captured pieces are truly captured in Whale Shogi. They are retained "in hand" and can be brought back into play under the capturing player's control. Pieces in hand are not hidden; they remain visible to both players.

On any turn, instead of moving a piece across the board, a player can select a piece in hand and place it on any empty square, facing the opponent. The piece is then one of that player's active pieces on the board and can be moved accordingly. This is called dropping the piece, or simply, a drop. A drop counts as a complete move.

A drop cannot capture a piece. Capture may occur normally, however, on subsequent moves of the piece.

A porpoise cannot be dropped as a porpoise. When captured, the porpoise promotes to a killer whale and can only be dropped as a killer whale.

There are three restrictions when dropping dolphins:

- Back Rank: A dolphin may not be dropped on the furthest rank (even though it would a legal move from there, unlike a regular shogi pawn).
- Third Dolphin: A dolphin cannot be dropped into the same file (vertical column) as two other dolphins of the same player.
- Drop Dolphin Mate: A dolphin cannot be dropped to give immediate mate. (This rule only applies specifically to dolphins, drops and checkmates − to clarify, a player may deliver an immediate checkmate by dropping a non-dolphin piece, a player may checkmate with a dolphin that is already on the board, and a dolphin may be dropped to give an immediate check as long as it does not also result in checkmate.)

=== Check and mate ===
When a player makes a move such that the opponent's white whale could be captured on the following move, the move is said to give check; White is said to be in check. If a player is in check and no legal move by that player will get out of check, the checking move is also mate and effectively wins the game.

A player is not allowed to give perpetual check.

=== Game end ===
A player who captures the opponent's white whale wins the game. In practice this rarely happens, as a player will resign when checkmated, as otherwise when loss is inevitable.

A player who makes an illegal move loses immediately. This rule may be relaxed in casual games.

Another possible (but fairly uncommon) way for a game to end is repetition (千日手 sennichite).

If the same position occurs four times with the same player to play, then the game is no contest. Recall, however, the prohibition against perpetual check. For two positions to be considered the same, the pieces in hand must be the same, as well as the position on the board.

Games which are no contest are usually counted as draws in amateur tournaments, but in a professional-style tournament the rules may require the game to be replayed with colors reversed (possibly with reduced time limits).

== Handicaps ==
Games between players of disparate strength can be played with handicaps. In a handicap game, one or more of White's pieces is removed before the start of play, and White plays the first move of the game. Note that the pieces removed at the beginning play no further part in the game—they are not available for drops. The imbalance created by this method of handicapping is not as strong as it is in chess, because material advantage is not as powerful in Whale Shogi as in chess.

== Game notation ==
The method used in English-language texts to express shogi moves was established by George Hodges in 1976. It is derived from the algebraic notation used for chess but differs in several respects. This notation is modified for use in Whale Shogi in the letters used to name the pieces.

A typical example is P-f6. The first letter represents the piece moved: D = dolphin, B = blue whale, N = narwhal, G = grey whale, H = humpback, P = porpoise, W = white whale. The promoted porpoise is simply K = killer whale. The designation of the piece is followed by a symbol indicating the type of move: - for an ordinary move, x for a capture, or * for a drop. Next is the designation for the square on which the piece lands. This consists of a lowercase letter representing the file and a number representing the rank, with a1 being the bottom left corner (as seen from Black's point of view) and f6 being the top right corner. This method of designating squares follows the Western rather than the Japanese convention.

In cases where the above notation would be ambiguous, the designation of the start square is added after the designation for the piece in order to make clear which piece is meant. For example, if Black has two humpbacks (one was captured and dropped) which can be moved to the square e3, and these are distinguished as (for example) Hd2-e3 and Hf2-e3.

Moves are commonly numbered as in chess. For example, the start of a game might look like this:

   1. D-e3   D-c4
   2. D-d3   N-a4
   3. D-d4   Dxd4

In handicap games White plays first, so Black's move 1 is replaced by an ellipsis.

== Paulowich Whale Shogi ==
This variant invented by David Paulowich in 2005 uses a 7×7 board and includes a new extra piece, the Pacific northern right whale (A). It moves as a minor grey whale in that instead of sliding, it moves only one square, but also directly forwards or diagonally backwards—in other words, just like a dog in tenjiku shogi. It can be captured and dropped and all other Whale Shogi rules are the same.

=== Setup ===
a	b	c	d	e	f	g
B	N	P	W	A	G	H	7
D	D	D	D	D	D	D	6
							5
							4
							3
D	D	D	D	D	D	D	2
H	G	A	W	P	N	B	1
