= Kurozuka (disambiguation) =

Kurozuka is the grave of an onibaba in Fukushima Prefecture, Japan.

Kurozuka may also refer to:

- Onibaba (folklore), the mythical creature also called "Kurozuka"
- Kurozuka (novel), a Japanese novel, manga and anime series
