= Onibaba =

Onibaba may refer to:

- Onibaba (folklore), creatures in Japanese folklore
- Onibaba (film), a 1964 Japanese horror film named after the creatures
