= Tai shogi =

25x25 grid variant of Japanese chess

Tai shogi (泰将棋 tai shōgi or 無上泰将棋 mujō tai shōgi "grand chess", renamed from 無上大将棋 mujō dai shōgi "supreme chess" to avoid confusion with 大将棋 dai shōgi) is a large board variant of shogi (Japanese chess). The game dates to the 15th century and is based on earlier large-board shogi games. Before the discovery of taikyoku shogi in 1997, tai shogi was believed to be the largest playable chess variant, if not board game, ever. One game may be played over several long sessions and require each player to make over a thousand moves. It was never a popular game; indeed, a single production of six game sets in the early 17th century was a notable event.

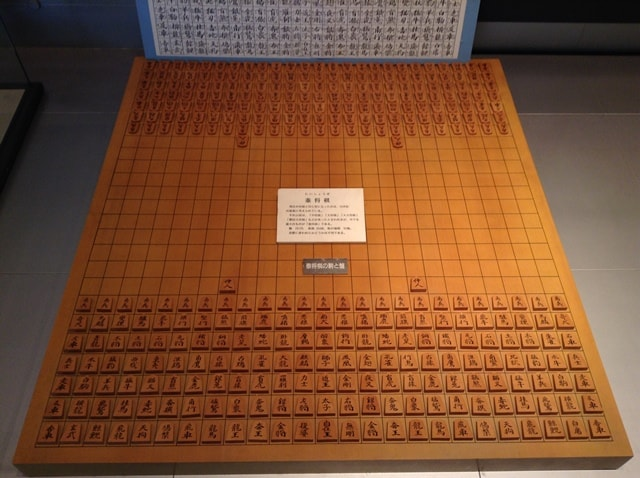
Tai shogi set display in at the Tendō shogi museum (天童市将棋資料館) showing the initial setup

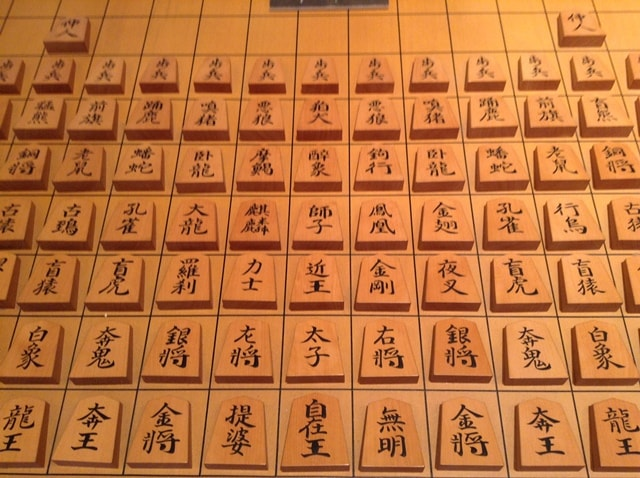
Close-up of the initial setup

Like other large-board variants, but unlike standard shogi, the game is played without drops, and uses a promotion-by-capture rule.

Because of the terse and often incomplete wording of the historical sources for the large shogi variants, except for chu shogi and to a lesser extent dai shogi (which were at some points of time the most prestigious forms of shogi being played), the historical rules of tai shogi are not clear. Different sources often differ significantly in the moves attributed to the pieces, and the degree of contradiction (summarised below with the listing of most known alternative moves) is such that it is likely impossible to reconstruct the "true historical rules" with any degree of certainty, if there ever was such a thing. It is not clear if the game was ever played much historically, as the few sets that were made seem to have been intended only for display.

== Rules of the game ==
Tai shogi is essentially a merger of two other large-board shogi variants: dai dai shogi and maka dai dai shogi. Almost all the pieces of those two smaller games are included, and where the same pieces are found, they move the same way. Additionally, many of the tai shogi pieces not from those two games already appear in the even more popular chu shogi. Only nine extra pieces are added that do not appear in any smaller games – the peacock, soldier, vermillion sparrow, turtle-snake, side dragon, golden deer, silver hare, fierce eagle, and ram's-head soldier. (Indeed, two of the Edo-era sources generally do not describe a piece for tai shogi if it exists in a smaller variant.)

The promotion rule is contested. Dai dai shogi and maka dai dai shogi have very different promotion rules. The promotion rules given on the Japanese Wikipedia are similar to those of maka dai dai shogi: almost all pieces promote, but most to the lowly gold general, even if they are much more powerful; and many weak pieces turn into "free" versions of themselves (in which stepping moves are replaced by unlimited ranging moves in the same directions). However, the promotion rules given in English-language sources are similar to those of dai dai shogi: most pieces do not promote. Both agree that promotion is compulsory upon capture if the piece can promote.

In maka dai dai shogi with its demotions, The Chess Variant Pages suggest that promotion is only compulsory when capturing a promoted piece, which seems more reasonable because otherwise the most powerful pieces would quickly disappear. However, in tai shogi non-promoting copies of those powerful pieces can be obtained by promoting some weak pieces.

The difference is unusual: in all smaller variants, Japanese Wikipedia agrees with the English-language sources on promotions, even though it does not always agree on the moves. There are additionally some confusions in the Japanese Wikipedia promotions: for example, the fragrant elephant is said to exist in tai shogi, but without a piece promoting into it. Because of this, the promotions from the English-language sources have been followed throughout this article, with alternatives given in the footnotes. That is, most pieces do not promote, and promotion (if possible) is compulsory on capture.

=== Objective ===
The objective of the game is to capture the opponent's emperor and prince (or princes). When the last of these is captured, the game ends. There are no rules for check or checkmate; however, in practice a player resigns when checkmated.

=== Game equipment ===
Two players, Black and White (or 先手 sente and 後手 gote), play on a board ruled into a grid of 25 ranks (rows) and 25 files (columns), for a total of 625 squares. The squares are undifferentiated by marking or color.

Each player has a set of 177 wedge-shaped pieces of 93 types. In all, the players must remember 100 moves for these pieces. The pieces are of slightly different sizes. From largest to smallest (or roughly most to least powerful) they are:

- 1 Emperor
- 1 Prince
- 1 Hook mover
- 2 Long-nosed goblins
- 1 Capricorn
- 2 Peacocks
- 2 Soaring eagles
- 2 Horned falcons
- 2 Queens
- 1 Rushing bird
- 2 Free demons
- 2 Free dream-eaters
- 2 Water buffalos
- 2 Flying oxen
- 2 Soldiers
- 2 Dragon kings
- 2 Dragon horses
- 1 Lion
- 2 Racing chariots
- 2 Rooks
- 2 Bishops
- 2 White horses
- 2 Whales
- 2 Standard bearers
- 1 Vermillion sparrow
- 1 Turtle-snake
- 1 Blue dragon
- 1 White tiger
- 1 Right chariot
- 1 Left chariot
- 2 Side dragons
- 2 Doves
- 1 She-devil
- 1 Golden bird
- 1 Great dragon
- 2 White elephants
- 1 Lion dog
- 1 Wrestler
- 1 Guardian of the Gods
- 1 Buddhist devil
- 2 Golden deer
- 2 Silver hares
- 2 Fierce eagles
- 1 Old kite
- 2 Violent oxen
- 2 Flying dragons
- 2 Old rats
- 2 Enchanted badgers
- 2 Flying horses
- 2 Prancing stags
- 2 Violent bears
- 2 Side movers
- 2 Vertical movers
- 2 Reverse chariots
- 1 Phoenix
- 1 Kirin
- 2 Poison snakes
- 1 Northern barbarian
- 1 Southern barbarian
- 1 Eastern barbarian
- 1 Western barbarian
- 2 Blind bears
- 1 Drunken elephant
- 1 Neighbor king
- 2 Blind tigers
- 2 Blind monkeys
- 2 Ferocious leopards
- 2 Reclining dragons
- 2 Chinese cocks
- 2 Old monkeys
- 2 Evil Wolves
- 2 Angry boars
- 2 Cat swords
- 2 Coiled serpents
- 1 Deva
- 1 Dark spirit
- 1 Right general
- 1 Left general
- 2 Gold generals
- 2 Silver generals
- 2 Copper generals
- 2 Tile generals
- 2 Iron generals
- 2 Wood generals
- 2 Stone generals
- 2 Earth generals
- 2 Go betweens
- 2 Knights
- 2 Howling dogs
- 2 Donkeys
- 2 Ram's-head soldiers
- 2 Lances
- 25 Pawns

Several of the English names were chosen to correspond to rough equivalents in Western chess, rather than as translations of the Japanese names. (Sometimes the queen is called the "free king", a direct translation of its Japanese name. The kirin's name is sometimes anglicised as kylin.)

Each piece has its name in the form of two kanji written on its face. On the reverse side of some pieces are one or two other characters, often in a different color (commonly red instead of black); this reverse side is turned up to indicate that the piece has been promoted during play. The pieces of the two sides do not differ in color, but instead each piece is shaped like a wedge, and faces forward, toward the opposing side. This shows who controls the piece during play.

==== Table of pieces ====
Listed here are the pieces of the game and, if they promote, which pieces they promote to.

Piece (*promoted piece only)	Kanji	Rōmaji	Promotes to
Emperor	(自在)天王	(jizai) tennō	—
Prince	太子	taishi	—
Hook mover	鉤行	kōgyō	Gold general
Long-nosed goblin	天狗	tengu	—
Capricorn	*摩𩹄(羯)	makatsu	Gold general
Peacock	孔雀	kujaku	—
Soaring eagle	飛鷲	hijū	—
Horned falcon	角鷹	kakuō	—
Queen	奔王	honnō	—
Rushing bird	行鳥	gyōchō	Free demon
Free demon (oni)	奔鬼	honki	—
Free dream-eater (baku)	奔獏	honbaku	—
Water buffalo	水牛	suigyū	Free dream-eater
Flying ox	飛牛	higyū	—
Soldier	兵士	heishi	—
Dragon king	龍王	ryūō	—
Dragon horse	龍馬	ryūme	—
Lion	獅子	shishi	Furious fiend
*Furious fiend	奮迅	funjin	—
Racing chariot	走車	sōsha	—
Rook	飛車	hisha	Gold general
Bishop	角行	kakugyō	Gold general
White horse	白駒	hokku	—
Whale	鯨鯢	keigei	—
Standard bearer	前旗	zenki	—
Vermillion sparrow	朱雀	suzaku	—
Turtle-snake	玄武	genbu	—
Blue dragon	青龍	seiryū	—
White tiger	白虎	byakko	—
Right chariot	右車	usha	—
Left chariot	左車	sasha	—
Side dragon	横龍	ōryū	Gold general
Dove	鳩槃	kyūhan	—
She-devil	夜叉	yasha	Gold general
Golden bird	金翅	kinshi	—
Great dragon	大龍	dairyū	—
White elephant	白象	hakuzō	—
Lion dog	狛犬	komainu	Great elephant
*Great elephant	大象	taizō	—
Wrestler	力士	rikishi	Gold general
Guardian of the Gods	金剛	kongō	Gold general
Buddhist devil	羅刹	rasetsu	Gold general
Golden deer	金鹿	konroku	—
Silver hare	銀兎	ginto	—
Fierce eagle	猛鷲	mōjū	—
Old kite	古鵄	kotetsu	Long-nosed goblin
Violent ox	猛牛	mōgyū	—
Flying dragon	飛龍	hiryū	Gold general
Old rat	老鼠	rōso	Wizard stork
*Wizard stork	*仙鶴	senkaku	—
Enchanted badger	変狸	henri	Dove
Flying horse	馬麟	barin	Queen
Prancing stag	踊鹿	yōroku	Square mover
*Square mover	方行	hōgyō	—
Violent bear	猛熊	mōyū	—
Side mover	横行	ōgyō	Gold general
Vertical mover	竪行	shugyō	Gold general
Reverse chariot	反車	hensha	—
Phoenix	鳳凰	hōō	Golden bird
Kirin	麒麟	kirin	Great dragon
Poisonous snake	毒蛇	dokuja	Hook mover
Northern barbarian	北狄	hokuteki	Fragrant elephant
*Fragrant elephant	香象	kōzō	—
Southern barbarian	南蛮	nanban	White elephant
Eastern barbarian	東夷	tōi	Lion
Western barbarian	西戎	seijū	Lion dog
Blind bear	盲熊	mōyū	—
Drunken elephant	醉象	suizō	Prince
Neighboring king	近王	kinnō	Standard bearer
Blind tiger	盲虎	mōko	—
Blind monkey	盲猿	mōen	Mountain witch
*Mountain witch	山母	sambo	—
Ferocious leopard	猛豹	mōhyō	—
Reclining dragon	臥龍	garyū	—
Chinese cock	淮鶏	waikei	Wizard stork
Old monkey	古猿	koen	—
Evil wolf	悪狼	akurō	—
Angry boar	嗔猪	shincho	—
Cat sword	猫刄	myōjin	—
Coiled serpent	蟠蛇	banja	—
Deva	提婆	daiba	Teaching king
*Teaching king	教王	kyōō	—
Dark spirit	無明	mumyō	Buddhist spirit
*Buddhist spirit	法性	hōsei	—
Right general	右将	ushō	—
Left general	左将	sashō	—
Gold general	金将	kinshō	—
Silver general	銀将	ginshō	—
Copper general	銅将	dōshō	—
Tile general	瓦将	gashō	—
Iron general	鉄将	tesshō	—
Wood general	木将	mokushō	—
Stone general	石将	sekishō	—
Earth general	土将	doshō	—
Go-between	仲人	chūnin	—
Knight	桂馬	keima	Gold general
Howling dog	*𠵇(^{口}奇)犬	kiken	—
Donkey	驢馬	roba	Gold general
Ram's-head soldier	羊兵	yōhei	—
Lance	香車	kyōsha	—
Pawn	歩兵	fuhyō	—

* The first kanji in 'howling' dog, 𠵇, is not supported by many fonts, and so is created here with the help of an ad hoc superscript ^{口} . Likewise, the second character in 'Capricorn' should be composed of 魚+曷 (𩹄), and the second character in 'wizard stork' should be 而 atop 鷦.

=== Setup ===
Below is a diagram showing the setup of one player's pieces. The way one player sees their own pieces is the same way the opposing player will see their pieces.

Board layout
							GB										GB							
P	P	P	P	P	P	P	P	P	P	P	P	P	P	P	P	P	P	P	P	P	P	P	P	P
HD	FH	EN	DO	FO	SM	VM	VB	SB	PR	AB	EW	LD	EW	AB	PR	SB	VB	VM	SM	FO	DO	EN	FH	HD
LC	BD	WO	EA	SG	T	I	C	OR	CO	RD	CA	DE	HM	RD	CO	OR	C	I	T	SG	EA	WO	VS	RC
SO	WB	FL	WS	EB	CC	HF	OM	OK	PC	GD	KR	LN	PH	GO	PC	RB	OM	HF	CC	SU	NB	FL	WB	SO
SC	WH	RS	VO	CS	BB	SV	GL	BM	BT	BU	WR	NK	GG	SD	BT	BM	GL	SV	BB	CS	VO	RS	WH	SC
RV	SI	SE	N	PS	FT	B	FE	WE	FR	S	LG	CP	RG	S	FR	WE	FE	B	FT	PS	N	SE	SI	RV
L	TS	W	FD	LO	D	R	DH	DK	Q	G	DV	E	DS	G	Q	DK	DH	R	D	LO	FD	W	WT	L

Legend
AB - Angry Boar	B - Bishop	BB - Blind Bear	BD - Blue Dragon
BU - Buddhist Devil	BM - Blind Monkey	BT - Blind Tiger	C - Copp. General
CA - Capricorn	CC - Chinese Cock	CO - Coiled Serpent	CP - Prince
CS - Cat Sword	D - Dove	DE - Drunken Elephant	DH - Dragon Horse
DK - Dragon King	DO - Donkey	DS - Dark Spirit	DV - Deva
E - Emperor	EA - Earth General	EB - Eastern Barbarian	EN - Enchanted Badger
EW - Evil Wolf	FD - Flying Dragon	FE - Fierce Eagle	FH - Flying Horse
FL - Fer. Leopard	FO - Flying Ox	FR - Free Demon	FT - Free Dream-Eater
G - Gold General	GB - Go Between	GD - Great Dragon	GG - Guardian of the Gods
GL - Golden Deer	GO - Golden Bird	HD - Howling Dog	HF - Horned Falcon
HM - Hook Mover	I - Iron General	KR - Kirin	L - Lance
LC - Left Chariot	LD - Lion Dog	LG - Left General	LN - Lion
LO - Long-nosed Goblin	N - Knight	NB - Northern Barbarian	NK - Neighbor King
OK - Old Kite	OM - Old Monkey	OR - Old Rat	P - Pawn
PC - Peacock	PH - Phoenix	PR - Prancing Stag	PS - Poison Snake
Q - Queen	R - Rook	RB - Rushing Bird	RC - Right Chariot
RD - Reclining Dragon	RG - Right General	RS - Ram's-head Soldier	RV - Reverse Chariot
S - Silver General	SB - Standard Bearer	SC - Racing Chariot	SD - She-devil
SE - Soaring Eagle	SG - Stone General	SI - Side Dragon	SM - Side Mover
SO - Soldier	SU - Southern Barbarian	SV - Silver Hare	T - Tile General
TS - Turtle-snake	VB - Violent Bear	VM - Vert. Mover	VO - Violent Ox
VS - Vermillion Sparrow	W - Whale	WB - Water Buffalo	WE - White Elephant
WH - White Horse	WO - Wood General	WR - Wrestler	WS - Western Barbarian
WT - White Tiger			

The queen could also be abbreviated FK (for free king) and the kirin as Ky (for kylin).

=== Game play ===
The players alternate making a move, with Black moving first. (The traditional terms 'black' and 'white' are used to differentiate the sides during discussion of the game, but are no longer literally descriptive.) A move consists of moving a single piece on the board and potentially promoting that piece or displacing (capturing) an opposing piece. Each of these options is detailed below.

=== Movement and capture ===
An opposing piece is captured by displacement: That is, if a piece moves to a square occupied by an opposing piece, the opposing piece is displaced and removed from the board. A piece cannot move to a square occupied by a friendly piece (meaning another piece controlled by the moving player).

Each piece on the game moves in a characteristic pattern. Pieces move either orthogonally (that is, forward, backward, left, or right, in the direction of one of the arms of a plus sign, +), or diagonally (in the direction of one of the arms of a multiplication sign, ×). The emperor, lion, and knight are exceptions at the beginning of the game, in that they do not move, or are not required to move, in a straight line. (The Buddhist spirit and furious fiend are similar, but they only appear as pieces promote.)

If a piece that cannot retreat or move aside advances across the board until it can no longer move, it must remain there until captured. This applies to the pawn, lance, ram's-head soldier, stone general, wood general, and iron general upon reaching the farthest rank, and to the knight upon reaching either of the two farthest ranks.

Many pieces are capable of several kinds of movement, with the type of movement most often depending on the direction in which they move. The movement categories are:

==== Step movers ====
Some pieces move only one square at a time. (If a friendly piece occupies an adjacent square, the moving piece may not move in that direction; if an opposing piece is there, it may be displaced and captured.)

The step movers are the prince, drunk elephant, neighbor king, blind tiger, blind monkey, ferocious leopard, reclining dragon, Chinese cock, old monkey, evil wolf, the generals (except the wood general), angry boar, cat sword, coiled serpent, deva, dark spirit, go between, and the 25 pawns on each side.

==== Limited ranging pieces ====
Some pieces can move along a limited number (2, 3, or 5) of free (empty) squares along a straight line in certain directions. Other than the limited distance, they move like ranging pieces (see below).

These pieces are the water buffalo, standard bearer, vermillion sparrow, turtle-snake, blue dragon, white tiger, dove, she-devil, golden bird, great dragon, white elephant, lion dog, wrestler, Guardian of the Gods, Buddhist devil, golden deer, silver hare, fierce eagle, old kite, violent ox, flying dragon, old rat, enchanted badger, flying horse, prancing stag, violent bear, the barbarians, and the wood general.

==== Jumping pieces ====
Several pieces can jump, that is, they can pass over any intervening piece, whether friend or foe, with no effect on either. These are the lion, kirin, phoenix, poison snake, donkey, and knight.

==== Ranging pieces ====
Many pieces can move any number of empty squares along a straight line, limited only by the edge of the board. If an opposing piece intervenes, it may be captured by moving to that square and removing it from the board. A ranging piece must stop where it captures and cannot bypass a piece that is in its way. If a friendly piece intervenes, the moving piece is limited to a distance that stops short of the intervening piece; if the friendly piece is adjacent, it cannot move in that direction at all.

The ranging pieces are the soaring eagle, horned falcon, queen, rushing bird, the demons, free dream-eater, water buffalo, flying ox, soldier, dragon king, dragon horse, the chariots, rook, bishop, white horse, whale, standard bearer, vermillion sparrow, turtle-snake, blue dragon, white tiger, side dragon, golden bird, great dragon, white elephant, golden deer, movers, howling dog, ram's-head soldier and lance.

==== Hook moves (changing tack) ====
The hook mover, long-nosed goblin, Capricorn, and peacock can move any number of squares along a straight line, as a normal ranging piece, but may also abruptly change tack left or right by 90° at any one place along the route, and then continue as a ranging piece. Turning a corner like this is optional.

The range covered by a hook move is the equivalent of two moves by a rook, or two moves by a bishop, depending on the piece. However, a hook move is functionally a single move: The piece cannot capture twice in one move, nor may it capture and then move on. It must stop before an intervening piece (unless it first changes direction to avoid it), and must stop when it captures, just like any other ranging piece. It can only change direction once per move.

==== Lion moves (multiple captures) ====
The lion, lion dog, soaring eagle, and horned falcon have sequential multiple-capture abilities, called "lion moves". Among the pieces that only appear with promotion, so do the teaching king, buddhist spirit, and furious fiend. The details of these powerful moves are described for the lion, below.

==== Promotion ====
The vast majority of pieces cannot promote. Those that can promote, however, must promote at the end of their first capturing move. Promotion is indicated by turning the piece over after it moves, revealing the character for the promoted piece. There are no promotion zones; dots on the board that usually represent promotion zones are present after the sixth rank only as a placement guide for initial setup. All this is as in dai dai shogi.

Promoting a piece has the effect of changing how that piece moves: see the table above for what each piece promotes to.

Pieces which are already promoted cannot promote again, except as follows:

Any piece promoted or not, that captures a Deva or teaching king (a promoted Deva) promotes to a teaching king. This is brought about by replacing it on the board with the captured piece. Similarly, any piece that captures a dark spirit or Buddhist spirit (a promoted dark spirit) promotes to a Buddhist spirit. This is sometimes expressed as the piece being contagious: when something captures a contagious piece type, it becomes that piece type. The only exception is (potentially) royal pieces (emperors, princes, and drunk elephants) which promote to their normal promoted forms or stay as they are if unpromotable or already promoted.

It is not clear what happens if a multi-capturing piece such as a lion or a lion dog captures two different contagious piece types in one turn, e.g. a lion capturing both a teaching king and a Buddhist spirit on the same turn. Although the situation is very unlikely to arise, an official of the Japanese Chu Shogi Association has suggested in discussion with H. G. Muller (who programmed an engine HaChu for chu shogi and wrote the descriptions for some large shogi variants for The Chess Variant Pages) that the multi-capturing piece would promote to the last piece captured. In the case of a lion dog capturing two pieces on the same orthogonal or diagonal, the official claimed that it would not be permitted to jump over the first piece, capture the second, and then move back to capture the first, though Muller admits that the logic did not "make much sense" to him and that he would be happy with the option to choose. (Note that this situation is extremely theoretical anyway, because allowing both these powerful pieces to be captured at once would imply very poor play.)

Otherwise, pieces don't promote more than once: they only have two sides.

==== Individual pieces ====
In the diagrams below, the different types of moves are coded by symbol and by color: Blue for step moves, yellow for jumps, green for multiple capture, and pink for range moves, as follows:

Notation
○	Steps a limited number of squares along a straight line.
☆	Jumps to this square, bypassing any intervening piece.
!	Igui (capture without moving). Counts as two steps.
☆	May jump directly to this square, or reach it through a multiple-step move.
│	Ranges along a straight line, crossing any number of empty squares
─	Ranges along a straight line, crossing any number of empty squares
╲	Ranges along a straight line, crossing any number of empty squares
╱	Ranges along a straight line, crossing any number of empty squares
╳	May turn 90° at this square.
┼	May turn 90° at this square.
∞	Can jump to any square on the board.

Piece names with a grey background are present at the start of the game; those with a blue background only appear with promotion. Betza's funny notation has been included in brackets for easier reference, with the extension that the notation xxxayyyK stands for an xxxK move followed by an yyyK move, not necessarily in the same direction. Larger numbers of 'legs' can be indicated by repeated application of 'a'. Directional modifiers on continuation legs must be interpreted relative to the previous leg, where 'f' means 'continue in the same direction'; default is 'all directions'. The default modality of the final leg is the usual 'mc', but on non-final legs also includes a hop over an obstacle at their endpoint, provided the path does not bend back onto itself there. Other (combinations of) modalities must be written explicitly. U denotes the universal leaper, a piece which can jump to any square on the board except the one that it is on.

There are many divergent descriptions in the Edo-era sources. However, almost all the pieces in tai shogi already appear either in dai dai shogi or maka dai dai shogi, and so they are presented here identically to how they are on the Wikipedia articles for those two games. Refer to those pages for footnotes detailing divergent moves. Footnotes are presented as usual for pieces that do not appear in smaller games.

Emperor 自在天王 jizai tennō
∞ / ∞ / ∞; ∞ / 天 / ∞; ∞ / ∞ / ∞; The emperor can jump to any empty square on the board.; It can jump to and capture any non-royal piece anywhere on the board.; It can capture a royal piece (prince, king, or the other emperor) anywhere on the board, but only if that piece is unprotected; capturing a protected royal piece is illegal. (U); In order to win the game, the opponent must be left with no emperors or princes. Since the drunk elephant also promotes to prince, that means that one might need to capture three royal pieces to achieve victory.
Pieces that gain entirely new powers when promoted
Drunken elephant 酔象 suizō	Prince 太子 taishi
○ / ○ / ○; ○ / 酔 / ○; ○ / / ○; The drunken elephant can move one square in any direction, orthogonal or diagonal, except orthogonally backward. (FfrlW); The drunken elephant promotes to a prince (right).	○ / ○ / ○; ○ / 子 / ○; ○ / ○ / ○; The prince can move one square in any direction. (K); In order to win the game, the opponent must be left with no emperors or princes. Since the drunk elephant also promotes to prince, that means that one might need to capture three royal pieces to achieve victory.
Teaching king 教王 kyōō	Buddhist spirit 法性 hōsei
╲ / / / / │ / / / / ╱; / ☆ / / / ☆ / / / ☆; / / ☆ / / ☆ / / ☆; / / / ! / ! / !; ─ / ☆ / ☆ / ! / 教 / ! / ☆ / ☆ / ─; / / / ! / ! / !; / / ☆ / / ☆ / / ☆; / ☆ / / / ☆ / / / ☆; ╱ / / / / │ / / / / ╲; The teaching king can move as either a lion dog or as a queen.; It can move as a queen, free-ranging in any one direction, orthogonal or diagonal.; It has a triple-capture move in any direction, orthogonal or diagonal. (QavKafavK); The teaching king does not exist except as a promoted Deva (below).	╲ / / / │ / / / ╱; / ☆ / ☆ / ☆ / ☆ / ☆; / ☆ / ! / ! / ! / ☆; ─ / ☆ / ! / 性 / ! / ☆ / ─; / ☆ / ! / ! / ! / ☆; / ☆ / ☆ / ☆ / ☆ / ☆; ╱ / / / │ / / / ╲; The Buddhist spirit can move as a lion or as a queen.; It can move as a queen, free-ranging in any direction, orthogonal or diagonal.; It has a double-capture move in any combination of directions, orthogonal or diagonal. (QNADaK); The Buddhist spirit does not exist except as a promoted dark spirit (below).
Deva 提婆 daiba	Dark spirit 無明 mumyō
○ / / ○; ○ / 提; / / ○; The Deva can move one square orthogonally left.; It can move one square diagonally forward.; It can move one square diagonally backward to the right. (f[br]FlW); The Deva promotes to a teaching king (above).	○ / / ○; / 無 / ○; ○; The dark spirit can move one square orthogonally right.; It can move one square diagonally forward.; It can move one square diagonally backward to the left. (f[bl]FrW); The dark spirit promotes to a Buddhist spirit (above).
Long-nosed goblin 天狗 tengu	Hook mover 鉤行 kōgyō
╳ / / ╱ / / ╲ / / ╳; / ╳ / / / / ╳; ╱ / / ╳ / ○ / ╳ / / ╲; / / ○ / 天 / ○; ╲ / / ╳ / ○ / ╳ / / ╱; / ╳ / / / / ╳; ╳ / / ╲ / / ╱ / / ╳; The tengu can move any number of free squares along one of the four diagonal directions, then (optionally) make a 90° turn and move any number of free squares in a perpendicular diagonal direction.; It may only change directions once per move.: It can step one square in one of the four orthogonal directions. (WmBaB)	/ ─ / ─ / ┼ / ─ / ─; │ / / ─ / ┼ / ─ / / │; │ / │ / / ┼ / / │ / │; ┼ / ┼ / ┼ / 行 / ┼ / ┼ / ┼; │ / │ / / ┼ / / │ / │; │ / / ─ / ┼ / ─ / / │; / ─ / ─ / ┼ / ─ / ─; The hook mover can move any number of free squares along one of the four orthogonal directions, then (optionally) make a 90° turn and move any number of free squares in a perpendicular orthogonal direction. (RmaR); It may only change directions once per move. The starting hook mover is among the pieces that demote to gold general; it is repeated here because the poisonous snake (below) promotes into it.
Old kite 古鵄 kotetsu	Poisonous snake 毒蛇 dokuja
/ / ○; / ○ / ○ / ○; ○ / ○ / 古 / ○ / ○; / / ○; / / ○; The old kite can step one or two squares in one of the four orthogonals.; It can step one square diagonally forward. (R2fF); The old kite promotes to a tengu (above).	/ / ☆; / ○ / 蛇 / ○; ☆ / / / / ☆; The poisonous snake can jump to the second square directly forward or diagonally backward.; It can step one square to either side. (rlWfDbA)
Great elephant 大象 taizō	Furious fiend 奮迅 funjin
/ / / / │; / / / / ☆; / / ○ / / ☆ / / ○; / / / ○ / ! / ○; ─ / ☆ / ☆ / ! / 大象 / ! / ☆ / ☆ / ─; / / / ! / ! / !; / / ☆ / / ☆ / / ☆; / ☆ / / / ☆ / / / ☆; ╱ / / / / │ / / / / ╲; The great elephant, should it exist in this game (there is some dispute on this point among the Edo-era sources), can move any number of free squares along one of the four orthogonal directions, or diagonally backward.; It can move up to two free squares along either of the forward diagonals.; It has the three-step lion move of the lion dog, but only along the orthogonals and backward diagonals.; The great elephant does not exist except as a promoted lion dog (below).	☆ / / / ☆ / / / ☆; / ☆ / ☆ / ☆ / ☆ / ☆; / ☆ / ! / ! / ! / ☆; ☆ / ☆ / ! / 迅 / ! / ☆ / ☆; / ☆ / ! / ! / ! / ☆; / ☆ / ☆ / ☆ / ☆ / ☆; ☆ / / / ☆ / / / ☆; The furious fiend can move as a lion or as a lion dog. (NADaKafavK); The furious fiend does not exist except as a promoted lion (below).
Lion dog 狛犬 komainu	Lion 獅子 shishi
☆ / / / ☆ / / / ☆; / ☆ / / ☆ / / ☆; / / ! / ! / !; ☆ / ☆ / ! / 狛 / ! / ☆ / ☆; / / ! / ! / !; / ☆ / / ☆ / / ☆; ☆ / / / ☆ / / / ☆; The lion dog can make a three-step lion move along any one of the eight orthogonal or diagonal directions. That is, unlike the lion itself, but like the soaring eagle and horned falcon, it is restricted to moving along a straight line and cannot move to the in-between squares. This lion power includes jumping, igui, and skipping a turn.; A piece may be captured on all three steps.; The lion dog may capture a piece on the first and second square, and then retreat to the first square. Or it may snatch a piece off the first square as in normal igui. (Note however that it may not then continue in the opposite direction: it is restricted to one orthogonal or diagonal.); It may jump to the second square, and then continue to the third square, capturing up to two pieces. Or it may jump directly to the third square.; It is not required to take all three steps. (KavKafavK); As it finishes a capturing move, the lion dog promotes to a great elephant (above). In rules that do not use the great elephant, the lion dog cannot promote.	☆ / ☆ / ☆ / ☆ / ☆; ☆ / ! / ! / ! / ☆; ☆ / ! / 獅 / ! / ☆; ☆ / ! / ! / ! / ☆; ☆ / ☆ / ☆ / ☆ / ☆; The lion can step in any direction, and capture, up to twice a turn. The two steps do not need to be in the same direction, so this move is equivalent to two turns of a king. As a piece does not promote until its turn ends, an unpromoted lion has a chance for a double capture.; By moving back to its starting square, it can effectively capture a piece on an adjacent square without moving. This is called 居喰い igui "stationary feeding".; It can also do the same to an empty square, without capturing anything. This is traditionally indicated by tapping the lion and leaving it in place.; A lion can jump anywhere within a distance of two squares: That is, anywhere it could reach in two step-moves on an empty board, though of course it cannot land on a square occupied by a friendly piece. This is equivalent to jumping in any of the eight diagonal or orthogonal directions, or making any of the jumps of a knight in Western chess. (NADaK); As it finishes a capturing move, the lion promotes to a furious fiend (above).
Western barbarian 西戎 seijū	Eastern barbarian 東夷 tōi
/ ○ / ○ / ○; ○ / ○ / 西 / ○ / ○; / / ○; The western barbarian can move one or two squares orthogonally sideways.; It can step one square directly forward or backward, or diagonally forward. (rlR2fbWfF); The western barbarian promotes to a lion dog (above).	/ ○; ○ / ○ / ○; ○ / 東 / ○; / ○; / ○; The eastern barbarian can move one or two squares directly forward or backward.; It can step one square orthogonally sideways or diagonally forward. (fbR2rlWfF); The eastern barbarian promotes to a lion (above).
Fragrant elephant 香象 kōzō	White elephant 白象 hakuzō
╲ / / / / / / ╱; / ╲ / / ○ / / ╱; / / ╲ / ○ / ╱; / ○ / ○ / 香象 / ○ / ○; / / ○ / ○ / ○; / ○ / / ○ / / ○; The fragrant elephant can move any number of free squares along either of the forward diagonals.; It can move one or two squares along any of the other directions (orthogonally, or diagonally backwards). (fBR2bB2); The fragrant elephant does not exist except as a promoted northern barbarian (below).	/ ○ / / ○ / / ○; / / ○ / ○ / ○; / ○ / ○ / 白象 / ○ / ○; / / ╱ / ○ / ╲; / ╱ / / ○ / / ╲; ╱ / / / / / / ╲; The white elephant can move any number of free squares diagonally backward.; It can move one or two square in one of the other six diagonal or orthogonal directions. (bBR2fB2)
Northern barbarian 北狄 hokuteki	Southern barbarian 南蛮 namban
○ / / / / ○; / ○ / / ○; / ○ / 北 / ○; / ○ / / ○; The northern barbarian can move one or two squares diagonally forward.; It can step one square orthogonally sideways or diagonally backward. (fB2rlWF); The northern barbarian promotes to a fragrant elephant (above).	/ ○ / / ○; / ○ / 南 / ○; / ○ / / ○; ○ / / / / ○; The southern barbarian can move one or two squares diagonally backward.; It can step one square orthogonally sideways or diagonally forward. (bB2rlWF); The southern barbarian promotes to a white elephant (above).
Free dream-eater 奔獏 honbaku	Free demon 奔鬼 honki
╲ / / / / / │ / / / / / ╱; / ╲ / / / / │ / / / / ╱; / / ╲ / / / │ / / / ╱; / / / ╲ / / │ / / ╱; / / / / ╲ / │ / ╱; ○ / ○ / ○ / ○ / ○ / 獏 / ○ / ○ / ○ / ○ / ○; / / / / ╱ / │ / ╲; / / / ╱ / / │ / / ╲; / / ╱ / / / │ / / / ╲; / ╱ / / / / │ / / / / ╲; ╱ / / / / / │ / / / / / ╲; The free dream-eater can move any number of free squares diagonally.; It can move one to five squares orthogonally sideways. (fbRBrlR5)	╲ / / / / / ○ / / / / / ╱; / ╲ / / / / ○ / / / / ╱; / / ╲ / / / ○ / / / ╱; / / / ╲ / / ○ / / ╱; / / / / ╲ / ○ / ╱; ─ / ─ / ─ / ─ / ─ / 鬼 / ─ / ─ / ─ / ─ / ─; / / / / ╱ / ○ / ╲; / / / ╱ / / ○ / / ╲; / / ╱ / / / ○ / / / ╲; / ╱ / / / / ○ / / / / ╲; ╱ / / / / / ○ / / / / / ╲; The free demon can move any number of free squares in the diagonal directions, or directly sideways.; It can move one to five squares directly forward or backward. (rlRBfbR5)
Water buffalo 水牛 suigyū	Rushing bird 行鳥 gyōchō
╲ / / / / / / ╱; / ╲ / / ○ / / ╱; / / ╲ / ○ / ╱; ─ / ─ / ─ / 水 / ─ / ─ / ─; / / ╱ / ○ / ╲; / ╱ / / ○ / / ╲; ╱ / / / / / / ╲; The water buffalo can move any number of free squares in the four diagonal directions, or orthogonally sideways.; It can move one or two squares directly forward or backward. (rlRBfbR2); The water buffalo promotes to a free dream-eater (above).	╲ / / / │ / / / ╱; / ╲ / / │ / / ╱; / / ╲ / │ / ╱; ─ / ─ / ─ / 鳥 / ─ / ─ / ─; / / ╱ / / ╲; / ╱ / / / / ╲; ╱ / / / / / / ╲; The rushing bird can move any number of free squares in any direction, orthogonal or diagonal, except directly backwards. (BfrlR); The rushing bird promotes to a free demon (above).
Queen 奔王 honnō	Standard bearer 前旗 zenki
╲ / / / │ / / / ╱; / ╲ / / │ / / ╱; / / ╲ / │ / ╱; ─ / ─ / ─ / 奔 / ─ / ─ / ─; / / ╱ / │ / ╲; / ╱ / / │ / / ╲; ╱ / / / │ / / / ╲; The queen can move any number of free squares in any of the eight directions, orthogonal or diagonal. (Q)	╲ / / / │ / / / ╱; / ╲ / / │ / / ╱; / / ╲ / │ / ╱; / ○ / ○ / 前 / ○ / ○; / / ○ / ○ / ○; / ○ / / ○ / / ○; The standard bearer can move any number of free squares along any of the three forward directions (diagonal or orthogonal).; It can step one or two squares along any of the other directions (orthogonally sideways, diagonally backwards, or directly backwards). (Q2fQ)
Flying horse 馬麟 barin	Neighboring king 近王 kinnō
○ / / / / ○; / ○ / ○ / ○; / ○ / 麟 / ○; / / ○; The flying horse can step one or two squares diagonally forward.; It can step one square in one of the four orthogonal directions. (fB2W); The flying horse promotes to a queen (above).	○ / ○ / ○; ○ / 近 / ○; ○ / ○ / ○; The neighbor king can step one square in any direction, orthogonal or diagonal. (K); The neighboring king promotes to a standard bearer (above).
Mountain witch 山母 sambo	Wizard stork 仙鶴 senkaku
╲ / / / / / / ╱; / ╲ / / / / ╱; / / ╲ / ○ / ╱; / / / 母; / / ╱ / │ / ╲; / ╱ / / │ / / ╲; ╱ / / / │ / / / ╲; The mountain witch can move any number of free squares along one of the four diagonal directions, or directly backward; or, It can step one square directly forward. (BbRfW); The mountain witch does not exist except as a promoted blind monkey (below).	╲ / / / │ / / / ╱; / ╲ / / │ / / ╱; / / ╲ / │ / ╱; / / / 仙; / / ╱ / ○ / ╲; / ╱ / / / / ╲; ╱ / / / / / / ╲; The wizard stork can move any number of free squares along one of the four diagonal directions, or directly forward; or, It can step one square directly backward. (BfRbW); The wizard stork does not exist except as a promoted Chinese cock or old rat (below).
Blind monkey 盲猿 mōen	Chinese cock 淮鶏 waikei
○ / / ○; ○ / 猿 / ○; ○ / / ○; The blind monkey can step one square in one of the four diagonal directions or either orthogonal sideways. (FrlW); The blind monkey promotes to a mountain witch (above).	○ / / ○; ○ / 鶏 / ○; / ○; The Chinese cock can move one square orthogonally sideways or backward; or diagonally forward. (rlbWfF); The Chinese cock promotes to a wizard stork (above).
Dove 鳩槃 kyūhan	Wizard stork 仙鶴 senkaku
○ / / / / / / / / / / ○; / ○ / / / / / / / / ○; / / ○ / / / / / / ○; / / / ○ / / ○ / / ○; / / / / ○ / ○ / ○; / / / ○ / ○ / 鳩 / ○ / ○; / / / / ○ / ○ / ○; / / / ○ / / ○ / / ○; / / ○ / / / / / / ○; / ○ / / / / / / / / ○; ○ / / / / / / / / / / ○; The dove can move one to five squares in one of the four diagonal directions.; It can step one or two squares in one of the four orthogonal directions. (R2B5)	╲ / / / │ / / / ╱; / ╲ / / │ / / ╱; / / ╲ / │ / ╱; / / / 仙; / / ╱ / ○ / ╲; / ╱ / / / / ╲; ╱ / / / / / / ╲; The wizard stork can move any number of free squares along one of the four diagonal directions, or directly forward; or, It can step one square directly backward. (BfRbW); The wizard stork does not exist except as a promoted Chinese cock (above) or old rat (below). It has been duplicated here because exceptionally among non-golds, two different pieces promote into it.
Enchanted badger 変狸 henri	Old rat 老鼠 rōso
/ / ○; / / ○; ○ / ○ / 狸 / ○ / ○; The enchanted badger can move one or two squares orthogonally forward or sideways. (frlR2); The enchanted badger promotes to a dove (above).	○ / / / / ○; / ○ / / ○; / / 鼠; / / ○; / / ○; The old rat can move one or two squares along a forward diagonal or the rear orthogonal, giving it three directions of movement. (fB2bR2); The old rat promotes to a wizard stork (above), according to TSA rules; see the footnotes.
Racing chariot 走車 sōsha	Square mover 方行 hōgyō
/ / / │; / / / │; / / / │; ─ / ─ / ─ / 走 / ─ / ─ / ─; / / ○ / │ / ○; / / / │; / / / │; The racing chariot can move any number of free squares along one of the four orthogonal directions.; It can step one square diagonally behind. (RbF); Nothing promotes into a racing chariot, but it was included here due to the symmetry of its move with that of the square mover (right). In several English sources the name of this piece is mistranslated as "side chariot".	/ / / │; / / / │; / / ○ / │ / ○; ─ / ─ / ─ / 方 / ─ / ─ / ─; / / / │; / / / │; / / / │; The square mover can move any number of free squares along one of the four orthogonal directions.; It can step one square on either forward diagonal. (RfF); The square mover does not exist except as a promoted prancing stag (below).
	Prancing stag 踊鹿 yōroku
	/ ○ / ○ / ○; ○ / ○ / 鹿 / ○ / ○; / ○ / / ○; The prancing stag can move one or two squares directly sideways.; It can step one square in one of the four diagonal directions, or directly forward. (rlR2FfW); It cannot move directly backwards. The prancing stag promotes to a square mover (above).
Golden bird 金翅 kinshi	Great dragon 大龍 dairyū
○ / / / │ / / / ○; / ○ / / │ / / ○; / / ○ / │ / ○; / ○ / ○ / 翅 / ○ / ○; / / ○ / │ / ○; / ○ / / │ / / ○; ○ / / / │ / / / ○; The golden bird can move any number of free squares directly forward or backward.; It can move one to three squares along any one of the four diagonals.; It can move one or two squares directly sideways. (fbRB3rlR2)	○ / / / / / / ○; / ○ / / ○ / / ○; / / ○ / ○ / ○; ─ / ─ / ─ / 大 / ─ / ─ / ─; / / ○ / ○ / ○; / ○ / / ○ / / ○; ○ / / / / / / ○; The great dragon can move any number of free squares directly to the side.; It can move one to three squares along any one of the four diagonals.; It can move one or two squares directly forward or backward. (rlRB3fbR2)
Phoenix 鳳凰 hōō	Kirin 麒麟 kirin
☆ / / / / ☆; / / ○; / ○ / 鳳 / ○; / / ○; ☆ / / / / ☆; The phoenix can step one square in one of the four orthogonal directions.; It can jump to the second square in one of the four diagonal directions. (WA); The phoenix promotes to a golden bird (above).	/ / ☆; / ○ / / ○; ☆ / / 麒 / / ☆; / ○ / / ○; / / ☆; The kirin can step one square in one of the four diagonal directions.; It can jump to the second square in one of the four orthogonal directions. (FD); Because of its unusual movement, an unpromoted kirin can only reach half the squares on the board. The kirin promotes to a great dragon (above).
Pieces that promote (or demote) to gold general
Capricorn 摩𩹄 makatsu	Hook mover 鉤行 kōgyō
╳ / / ╱ / / ╲ / / ╳; / ╳ / / / / ╳; ╱ / / ╳ / / ╳ / / ╲; / / / 摩; ╲ / / ╳ / / ╳ / / ╱; / ╳ / / / / ╳; ╳ / / ╲ / / ╱ / / ╳; The Capricorn can make the equivalent of two moves of a bishop: It can move any number of free squares in one of the four diagonal directions, then any number of free squares in a perpendicular direction.; It is not required to make a perpendicular move.; It may only capture once, and cannot continue after capturing. (BmaB); Because it cannot move orthogonally, an unpromoted capricorn can only reach half the squares on the board.	/ ─ / ─ / ┼ / ─ / ─; │ / / ─ / ┼ / ─ / / │; │ / │ / / ┼ / / │ / │; ┼ / ┼ / ┼ / 行 / ┼ / ┼ / ┼; │ / │ / / ┼ / / │ / │; │ / / ─ / ┼ / ─ / / │; / ─ / ─ / ┼ / ─ / ─; The hook mover can make the equivalent of two moves of a rook: It can move any number of free squares in one of the four orthogonal directions, then any number of free squares in a perpendicular direction.; It is not required to make a perpendicular move.; It may only capture once, and cannot continue after capturing. (RmaR); The hook mover was duplicated above, as it is the promoted form of the poisonous snake.
Bishop 角行 kakugyō	Rook 飛車 hisha
╲ / / / / / / ╱; / ╲ / / / / ╱; / / ╲ / / ╱; / / / 角; / / ╱ / / ╲; / ╱ / / / / ╲; ╱ / / / / / / ╲; A bishop can move any number of free squares in one of the four diagonal directions. (B); Because it cannot move orthogonally, an unpromoted bishop can only reach half the squares on the board.	/ / / │; / / / │; / / / │; ─ / ─ / ─ / 飛 / ─ / ─ / ─; / / / │; / / / │; / / / │; The rook can move any number of free squares in one of the four orthogonal directions. (R)
Wrestler 力士 rikshi	Guardian of the Gods 金剛 kongō
○ / / / / / / ○; / ○ / / / / ○; / / ○ / / ○; / / ○ / 力 / ○; / / ○ / / ○; / ○ / / / / ○; ○ / / / / / / ○; The wrestler can move up to three squares in one of the four diagonal directions, or; It can move one square orthogonally sideways. (B3rlW)	/ / / ○; / / / ○; / / ○ / ○ / ○; ○ / ○ / ○ / 剛 / ○ / ○ / ○; / / / ○; / / / ○; / / / ○; The guardian of the Gods can move up to three squares in one of the four orthogonal directions; or; It can move one square diagonally forward. (R3fF)
Buddhist devil 羅刹 rasetsu	She-devil 夜叉 yasha
○ / / / / / / ○; / ○ / / / / ○; / / ○ / / ○; / / ○ / 羅 / ○; / / / ○; The Buddhist devil can move up to three squares diagonally forward; or; It can move one square orthogonally sideways or backward. (fB3rlbW)	/ / / / / ○; / / / / / ○; / / / / / ○; / / / ○ / / ○ / / ○; / / / / ○ / ○ / ○; ○ / ○ / ○ / ○ / ○ / 叉 / ○ / ○ / ○ / ○ / ○; / / / / ○ / ○ / ○; / / / ○ / / ○ / / ○; / / / / / ○; / / / / / ○; / / / / / ○; The she-devil can move one or two squares in one of the four diagonal directions; or; It can move up to five squares in one of the four orthogonal directions. (R5B2)
Side dragon 横龍 ōryū	Flying dragon 飛龍 hiryū
/ / / │; / / / │; / / / │; ─ / ─ / ─ / 横 龍 / ─ / ─ / ─; / / / ○; The side dragon can move any number of free squares orthogonally forward or sideways; or, It can move one square directly backward. (frlRbW)	○ / / / / ○; / ○ / / ○; / / 飛 龍; / ○ / / ○; ○ / / / / ○; The flying dragon can move one or two squares in one of the four diagonal directions. (B2); Because it cannot move orthogonally, an unpromoted flying dragon can only reach half the squares on the board.
Vertical mover 竪行 shugyō	Side mover 横行 ōgyō
/ │; / │; / │; ○ / 竪 / ○; / │; / │; / │; The vertical mover can move any number of free squares orthogonally forward or backward; or; It can move one square orthogonally sideways. (fbRW)	/ / / ○; ─ / ─ / ─ / 横 / ─ / ─ / ─; / / / ○; The side mover can move any number of free squares orthogonally sideways; or; It can move one square orthogonally forward or backward. (rlRW)
Knight 桂馬 keima	Donkey 驢馬 roba
☆ / / ☆; / 桂; A knight jumps at an angle intermediate between orthogonal and diagonal, amounting to one square forward plus one square diagonally forward, in a single motion. That is, it has a choice of two forward destinations. (ffN); The knight ignores intervening pieces on the way to its destination, though its destination square must of course be either empty, or occupied by an opponent's piece (in which case the opponent's piece is captured), just as with any other moving piece.	/ ☆; / ○; ○ / 驢 / ○; / ○; / ☆; The donkey can move one square in one of the four orthogonal directions; or; It can jump to the second square orthogonally forward or backward. (WfbD); Western sources do not have the vertical step move, restricting the donkey to half of the squares.
Non-promoting pieces
Peacock 孔雀 kujaku	Fierce eagle 猛鷲 mōjū
╳ / / ╱ / / ╲ / / ╳; / ╳ / / / / ╳; ╱ / / ╳ / / ╳ / / ╲; / ╱ / / 孔 / / ╲; ╱ / / ○ / / ○ / / ╲; / ○ / / / / ○; The peacock can move any number of free squares along one of the two forward diagonals, then (optionally) turn 90° and move any number of free squares in a perpendicular diagonal direction; or, It can move one or two squares in one of the two rearward diagonals. (bB2fBfmasB)	○ / / / / ○; / ○ / / ○; / ○ / 猛 鷲 / ○; / ○ / / ○; ○ / / / / ○; The fierce eagle can move one or two squares in one of the four diagonal directions; or, It may step one square orthogonally sideways. (B2rlW)
Horned falcon 角鷹 kakuō	Soaring eagle 飛鷲 hijū
╲ / / / / / / ╱; / ╲ / / ☆ / / ╱; / / ╲ / ! / ╱; ─ / ─ / ─ / 鷹 / ─ / ─ / ─; / / ╱ / │ / ╲; / ╱ / / │ / / ╲; ╱ / / / │ / / / ╲; The horned falcon can move any number of free squares along any direction except directly forwards.; It can step twice, or jump two squares, directly forward, capturing up to two pieces. This power includes igui and skipping a turn (see "Lion"). (BrlbRf[avW]fD)	/ / / │; / ☆ / / │ / / ☆; / / ! / │ / !; ─ / ─ / ─ / 鷲 / ─ / ─ / ─; / / ╱ / │ / ╲; / ╱ / / │ / / ╲; ╱ / / / │ / / / ╲; The soaring eagle can move any number of free squares in any direction except diagonally forward.; It can step twice, or jump two squares, diagonally forward, capturing up to two pieces. This power includes igui and skipping a turn (see "Lion"). (RbBf[avF]fA)
Flying ox 飛牛 higyū	Soldier 兵士 heishi
╲ / / / │ / / / ╱; / ╲ / / │ / / ╱; / / ╲ / │ / ╱; / / / 牛; / / ╱ / │ / ╲; / ╱ / / │ / / ╲; ╱ / / / │ / / / ╲; The flying ox can move any number of free squares along any one of the four diagonal directions, or directly forward or backward, giving it six directions of movement. (BfbR)	/ / / │; / / / │; / / / │; ─ / ─ / ─ / 士 / ─ / ─ / ─; / / ╱ / │ / ╲; / ╱ / / │ / / ╲; ╱ / / / │ / / / ╲; The soldier can move any number of free squares along any of the four orthogonals; or along the rear diagonals. (RbB)
Dragon king 龍王 ryūō	Dragon horse 龍馬 ryūme
/ / / │; / / / │; / / ○ / │ / ○; ─ / ─ / ─ / 龍 / ─ / ─ / ─; / / ○ / │ / ○; / / / │; / / / │; The dragon king can move any number of free squares in one of the four orthogonal directions; or; It can move one square in one of the four diagonal directions. (FR)	╲ / / / / / / ╱; / ╲ / / / / ╱; / / ╲ / ○ / ╱; / / ○ / 馬 / ○; / / ╱ / ○ / ╲; / ╱ / / / / ╲; ╱ / / / / / / ╲; The dragon horse can move any number of free squares in one of the four diagonal directions; or; It can move one square in one of the four orthogonal directions. (WB)
White horse 白駒 hakku	Whale 鯨鯢 keigei
╲ / / / │ / / / ╱; / ╲ / / │ / / ╱; / / ╲ / │ / ╱; / / / 駒; / / / │; / / / │; / / / │; The white horse can move any number of free squares orthogonally forward or backward, or diagonally forward, giving it four directions of movement. (fQbR)	/ / / │; / / / │; / / / │; / / / 鯨; / / ╱ / │ / ╲; / ╱ / / │ / / ╲; ╱ / / / │ / / / ╲; The whale can move any number of free squares orthogonally forward or backward, or diagonally backward, giving it four directions of movement. (fRbQ)
Vermillion sparrow 朱雀 suzaku	Turtle-snake 玄武 genbu
╲ / / / / / / ╱; / ╲ / / / / ╱; / / ╲ / ○ / ╱; / / / 朱; / / ○ / │ / ○; / ○ / / │ / / ○; / / / │; The vermillion sparrow can move any number of free squares diagonally forward or directly backward; or, It can move one or two squares diagonally backward; or, It can step one square directly forward. (fBfWbRbB2)	╲ / / / │ / / / ╱; / ╲ / / │ / / ╱; / / ╲ / │ / ╱; / / / 玄; / / ○ / ○ / ○; / ○ / / / / ○; The turtle-snake can move any number of free squares diagonally or directly forward; or, It can move one or two squares diagonally backward; or, It can step one square directly backward. (fQbWbB2)
White tiger 白虎 byakko	Blue dragon 青龍 seiryū
╲ / / / │; / ╲ / / │; / / ╲ / │ / ○; / ○ / ○ / 白虎 / ○ / ○; / / / │; / / / │; / / / │; Range: The white tiger can move any number of free squares directly forward or backward, or along the forward left diagonal.; Limited range: It can step one or two squares directly sideways. (fbR[fl]BrlR2fF); Step: It can step one square diagonally forward to the right.	/ / / / / / ╱; / / / ○ / / ╱; / / ○ / ○ / ╱; ─ / ─ / ─ / 青 / ─ / ─ / ─; / / / ○; / / / ○; Range: The blue dragon can move any number of free squares directly to either side, or along the forward right diagonal.; Limited range: It can step one or two squares directly forward or backward. (rlR[fr]BfbR2fF); Step: It can step one square diagonally forward to the left.
Left chariot 左車 sasha	Right chariot 右車 usha
╲ / / / │; / ╲ / / │; / / ╲ / │; / / / 左 車; / / / ○ / ╲; / / / / / ╲; / / / / / / ╲; Range: The left chariot can move any number of free squares straight forward, or along the forward left or rear right diagonals. (fR[fl][br]BbW); Step: It can step one square directly backward.	/ / / │ / / / ╱; / / / │ / / ╱; / / / │ / ╱; / / / 右 車; / / ╱ / ○; / ╱; ╱; Range: The right chariot can move any number of free squares straight forward, or along the forward right or rear left diagonals.; Step: It can step one square directly backward. (fR[fr][bl]BbW)
Golden deer 金鹿 konroku	Silver hare 銀兎 ginto
╲ / / / / / / ╱; / ╲ / / / / ╱; / / ╲ / / ╱; / / / 鹿; / / ○ / / ○; / ○ / / / / ○; The golden deer can move any number of free squares diagonally forward; or, It can move one or two squares diagonally backward. (fBbB2)	/ ○ / / / / ○; / / ○ / / ○; / / / 兎; / / ╱ / / ╲; / ╱ / / / / ╲; ╱ / / / / / / ╲; The silver hare can move any number of free squares diagonally backward; or, It can move one or two squares diagonally forward. (fB2bB)
Violent ox 猛牛 mōgyū	Violent bear 猛熊 mōyū
/ / ○; / / ○; ○ / ○ / 牛 / ○ / ○; / / ○; / / ○; The violent ox can move one or two squares in one of the four orthogonal directions. (R2)	○ / / / / ○; / ○ / / ○; / ○ / 猛 熊 / ○; The violent bear can move one or two squares diagonally forward, or, It can step one square orthogonally sideways. (fB2rlW)
Reverse chariot 反車 hensha	Blind bear 盲熊 mōyū
│; │; │; 反; │; │; │; The reverse chariot can move any number of free squares orthogonally forward or backward. (fbR)	○ / / ○; / 盲 熊; ○ / │ / ○; / │; / │; The blind bear can move any number of free squares orthogonally backward; or; It can move one square in one of the four diagonal directions. (FbR)
Blind tiger 盲虎 mōko	Ferocious leopard 猛豹 mōhyō
○ / / ○; ○ / 虎 / ○; ○ / ○ / ○; The blind tiger can move one square in any direction, orthogonal or diagonal, except orthogonally forward. (FrlbW)	○ / ○ / ○; / 豹; ○ / ○ / ○; The ferocious leopard can move one square in one of the four diagonal directions; or; It can move one square orthogonally forward or backward. (FfbW)
Reclining dragon 臥龍 garyū	Old monkey 古猿 koen
/ ○; ○ / 臥 / ○; ○ / ○ / ○; The reclining dragon can move one square in one of the four orthogonal directions or diagonally backward. (WbF)	○ / / ○; / 猿; ○ / ○ / ○; The old monkey can move one square in one of the four diagonal directions or orthogonally backward. (FbW)
Evil wolf 悪狼 akurō	Coiled serpent 蟠蛇 banja
○ / ○ / ○; ○ / 狼 / ○; The evil wolf can move one square orthogonally sideways or forward; or diagonally forward. (frlK)	/ ○; / 蛇; ○ / ○ / ○; The coiled serpent can move one square orthogonally forward or backward; or diagonally backward. (fbWbF)
Angry boar 嗔猪 shincho	Cat sword 猫刄 myōjin
/ ○; ○ / 嗔 / ○; / ○; The angry boar can move one square in one of the four orthogonal directions. (W)	○ / / ○; / 猫; ○ / / ○; The cat sword can move one square in one of the four diagonal directions. (F); Because it cannot move orthogonally, a cat sword can only reach half the squares on the board.
Left general 左将 sashō	Right general 右将 ushō
○ / ○ / ○; / 左将 / ○; ○ / ○ / ○; Step: The left general can move one square in any direction except directly left. It is called the left general because it guards the left side of the board. (FfrbW)	○ / ○ / ○; ○ / 右将; ○ / ○ / ○; Step: The right general can step one square in any direction except directly right. It is called the right general because it guards the right side of the board. (FflbW)
Gold general 金将 kinshō	Silver general 銀将 ginshō
○ / ○ / ○; ○ / 金 / ○; / ○; A gold general can move one square in one of the four orthogonal directions; or; One square diagonally forward, giving it six possibilities.; It cannot move diagonally backward. (WfF)	○ / ○ / ○; / 銀; ○ / / ○; A silver general can move one square in one of the four diagonal directions; or; One square straight forward, giving it five possibilities. (FfW)
Copper general 銅将 dōshō	Iron general 鉄将 tesshō
○ / ○ / ○; / 銅; / ○; The copper general can move one square orthogonally forward or backward; or; It can move one square diagonally forward. (fbWfF)	○ / ○ / ○; / 鐵; The iron general can move one square forward, orthogonally or diagonally. (fK); Because it cannot move sideways or backward, an iron general can only reach a fraction of the squares on the board. An iron general that reaches the farthest rank is trapped.
Tile general 瓦将 gashō	Stone general 石将 sekishō
○ / / ○; / 瓦; / ○; The tile general can move one square diagonally forward or orthogonally backward. (fFbW)	○ / / ○; / 石; The stone general can move one square diagonally forward. (fF); Because it cannot move orthogonally or backward, a stone general can only reach less than half the squares on the board. A stone general that reaches the farthest rank is trapped.
Wood general 木将 mokushō	Earth general 土将 doshō / Go-between 仲人 chūnin
○ / / / / ○; / ○ / / ○; / / 木; The wood general can move one or two squares diagonally forward. (fB2); Because it cannot move orthogonally or backward, a wood general can only reach less than half the squares on the board. A wood general that reaches the farthest rank is trapped.	○; 土; ○; The earth general and go-between can move one square orthogonally forward or backward. (fbW); These pieces have the same range of movement, and neither promotes; thus, it is unnecessary to give them separate names. The only differences are the names and placement on the starting setup.
Howling dog 𠵇犬 kiken	Ram's-head soldier 羊兵 yōhei
│; │; │; 𠵇; ○; Range: The howling dog can move any number of free squares directly forward.; Step: It can step one square directly backwards. (fRbW)	╲ / / / / / / ╱; / ╲ / / / / ╱; / / ╲ / / ╱; / / / 羊; The ram's-head soldier can move any number of free squares along either forward diagonal. (fB); A ram's-head soldier that reaches the farthest rank is trapped.
Lance 香車 kyōsha	Pawn 歩兵 fuhyō
│; │; │; 香; Range: The lance can move any number of free squares directly forward, giving it only one direction of movement. (fR); A lance that reaches the far rank is trapped.	○; 歩; Step: A pawn can step one square directly forward. (fW); A pawn that reaches the far rank is trapped.

=== Repetition ===
A player may not make a move if the resulting position is one that has previously occurred in the game with the same player to move. This is called repetition (千日手 sennichite). Note that certain pieces have the ability to pass in certain situations (lions, lion dogs, furious fiends, soaring eagles, horned falcons, teaching kings, and Buddhist spirits). Such a pass move leaves the position unchanged, but it does not violate the repetition rule, as it will now be the turn of the other player to move. Of course, two consecutive passes are not possible, as the first player will see the same position as before.

However, evidence from chu shogi problems suggests that this at least does not apply to a player who is in check or whose pieces are attacked, as otherwise one could win via perpetual check or perpetual pursuit. The modern chu shogi rule as applied by the Japanese Chu Shogi Association (JCSA) is as follows, and presumably tai shogi should be similar. If one side is making attacks on other pieces (however futile) with his moves in the repeat cycle, and the other is not, the attacking side must deviate, while in case of checking the checker must deviate regardless of whether the checked side attacks other pieces. In the case of consecutive passes, the side passing first must deviate, making turn passing to avoid zugzwang pointless if the opponent is in a position where he can pass his turn too. Only the fourth repetition is forbidden by these rules. If none of these are applicable, repetition is a draw.

=== Check and mate ===
When a player makes a move such that the opponent's emperor or prince (sole one in play) could be captured on the following move, the move is said to give check to the emperor or prince; the emperor or prince is said to be in check. If a player's emperor or prince is in check and no legal move by that player will get the emperor or prince out of check, the checking move is also a mate, and effectively wins the game. If a player has both an emperor and one or more princes in play, then the player need not move only one out of check.

Recall that an emperor can only capture a royal piece if that royal piece is unprotected. (Capturing non-royal protected pieces is legal, just almost always a very poor move.) This prohibition applies even if the opponent's last royal piece is being captured: here "protected" means that the opponent could recapture if we ignore that he has just lost his last royal.

=== Game end ===
A player who captures the opponent's sole remaining emperor or prince wins the game. Thus a player who is checkmated or stalemated will lose. In practice this rarely happens; a player will resign when loss is inevitable and the king will be taken on the opponent's next move (as in International Chess) because of the tradition that it is seen as an embarrassment to lose. The very artificial situation of a smothered stalemate, where no moves are possible (even those that would expose the king), is not covered in the historical sources. On their pages for chu shogi and dai shogi, The Chess Variant Pages rule this as a loss for the stalemated player, for definiteness.

A player who makes an illegal move loses immediately. (This rule may be relaxed in casual games.)

There is a (probably fallacious) rule that draws cannot be agreed.

== Game notation ==
The method used in English-language texts to express shogi moves was established by George Hodges in 1976. It is derived from the algebraic notation used for chess, but differs in several respects. Modifications have been made for tai shogi.

A typical example is P-8h. The first letter represents the piece moved (see above). Promoted pieces have a + added in front of the letter. (e.g., +CC for a wizard stork (promoted Chinese cock). The designation of the piece is followed by a symbol indicating the type of move: - for an ordinary move or x for a capture. Next is the designation for the square on which the piece lands. This consists of a number representing the file and a lowercase letter representing the rank, with 1a being the top right corner (as seen from Black's point of view) and 25y being the bottom left corner. (This method of designating squares is based on Japanese convention, which, however, uses Japanese numerals instead of letters. For example, the square 2c is denoted by 2三 in Japanese.)

If a soaring eagle, horned falcon, lion or Buddhist spirit captures by 'igui’, the square of the piece being captured is used instead of the destination square, and this is preceded by the symbol '!'. If a double capture is made, then it is added after the first capture.

If a capture mandates the player to promote the piece, then a + is added to the end to signify that the promotion was taken. For example, ORx7c+ indicates an old rat capturing on 7c and promoting.

In cases where the above notation would be ambiguous, the designation of the start square is added after the designation for the piece in order to make clear which piece is meant.

Moves are commonly numbered as in chess.

== Strategy ==
=== Piece values ===
According to the German Chu Shogi Association, the average values of the pieces are as follows. Note that these use the move interpretations of The Shogi Association, e.g. the lion dog as only a three-square limited ranging piece in all directions, with no lion power. They also make the additional change that the prince is allowed to promote to emperor, although TSA rules do not allow this.

Average piece values
Piece name	Approximate value	Promotion	Approximate value
Emperor	∞	—	—
Prince	4	Emperor	∞
Drunk Elephant	3	Prince	4
Long-Nosed Goblin	89	—	—
Peacock	66	—	—
Hook Mover	232	Gold General	3
Capricorn	88	Gold General	3
Lion	22	Furious Fiend	24
Queen	21	—	—
Rushing Bird	20	Free Demon	18
Free Dream-Eater	19	—	—
Horned Falcon	18	—	—
Free Demon	18	—	—
Water Buffalo	17	Free Dream-Eater	19
Soaring Eagle	17	—	—
Flying Ox	16	—	—
Standard Bearer	15	—	—
Soldier	14	—	—
Vermillion Sparrow	13	—	—
White Horse	13	—	—
Golden Bird	12	—	—
White Tiger	11	—	—
Blue Dragon	11	—	—
Great Dragon	11	—	—
Turtle Snake	10	—	—
Left Chariot	10	—	—
Right Chariot	10	—	—
Dove	9	—	—
Whale	9	—	—
Lion Dog	8	Great Elephant	9
White Elephant	8	—	—
Dragon King	13	—	—
Dragon Horse	12	—	—
Racing Chariot	12	—	—
Golden Deer	8	—	—
Ram's-Head Soldier	7	—	—
Silver Hare	5	—	—
She-Devil	9	Gold General	3
Guardian of the Gods	5	Gold General	3
Wrestler	5	Gold General	3
Buddhist Devil	4	Gold General	3
Rook	11	Gold General	3
Bishop	10	Gold General	3
Side Dragon	10	Gold General	3
Vertical Mover	7	Gold General	3
Side Mover	6	Gold General	3
Reverse Chariot	6	—	—
Howling Dog	5	—	—
Lance	4	—	—
Old Kite	4	Long-Nosed Goblin	89
Poisonous Snake	1	Hook Mover	232
Eastern Barbarian	4	Lion	22
Dark Spirit	2	Buddhist Spirit	35
Deva	2	Teaching King	29
Flying Horse	4	Queen	21
Neighbouring King	3	Standard-Bearer	15
Old Rat	2	Wizard Stork	15
Chinese Cock	2	Wizard Stork	15
Northern Barbarian	3	Fragrant Elephant	12
Phoenix	3	Golden Bird	12
Blind Monkey	3	Mountain Witch	12
Kirin	3	Great Dragon	11
Western Barbarian	3	Lion Dog	8
Southern Barbarian	3	White Elephant	8
Enchanted Badger	2	Dove	9
Prancing Stag	4	Square Mover	12
Flying Dragon	3	Gold General	3
Donkey	2	Gold General	3
Knight	1	Gold General	3
Fierce Eagle	4	—	—
Blind Bear	3	—	—
Left General	3	—	—
Right General	3	—	—
Blind Tiger	3	—	—
Violent Ox	3	—	—
Gold General	3	—	—
Ferocious Leopard	3	—	—
Violent Bear	3	—	—
Evil Wolf	3	—	—
Reclining Dragon	3	—	—
Silver General	2	—	—
Old Monkey	2	—	—
Copper General	2	—	—
Wood General	2	—	—
Iron General	2	—	—
Cat Sword	2	—	—
Coiled Serpent	2	—	—
Angry Boar	2	—	—
Tile General	1	—	—
Stone General	1	—	—
Earth General	1	—	—
Go-Between	1	—	—
Pawn	1	—	—

These average values do not take into account the special status of the prince as a royal piece, or emperor as disposable if there's a prince and other piece(s). They have also been normalized so that the pawn is worth 1 point to avoid fractions. Additionally, pieces change value if they have a good chance of promotion. This is particularly significant for the hook mover and capricorn, which are two of the most powerful pieces in the game, but "promote" to the weak gold general; and the old kite and poisonous snake, which promote respectively to the hook mover and long-nosed goblin.

== See also ==
- Shogi variant
  - Wa shogi
  - Chu shogi
  - Heian dai shogi
  - Dai shogi
  - Tenjiku shogi
  - Dai dai shogi
  - Maka dai dai shogi
  - Taikyoku shogi

== Notes on pieces with conflicting descriptions ==
These descriptions are taken from Japanese Wikipedia, which references the Edo-era publications 象戯図式 Shōgi Zushiki (SZ), 諸象戯図式 Sho Shōgi Zushiki (SSZ), and 象棋六種之図式 Shōgi Rokushu no Zushiki (SRZ). The first two are generally though not always in agreement, but the third differs in the case of most pieces which are not found in smaller shogi variants.

For reasons of space, and to avoid duplication, issues regarding pieces that already appear in dai dai or maka dai dai shogi are discussed in those articles rather than here.
