= Minamoto no Tsunemoto =

Japanese imperial prince and samurai (894–961)

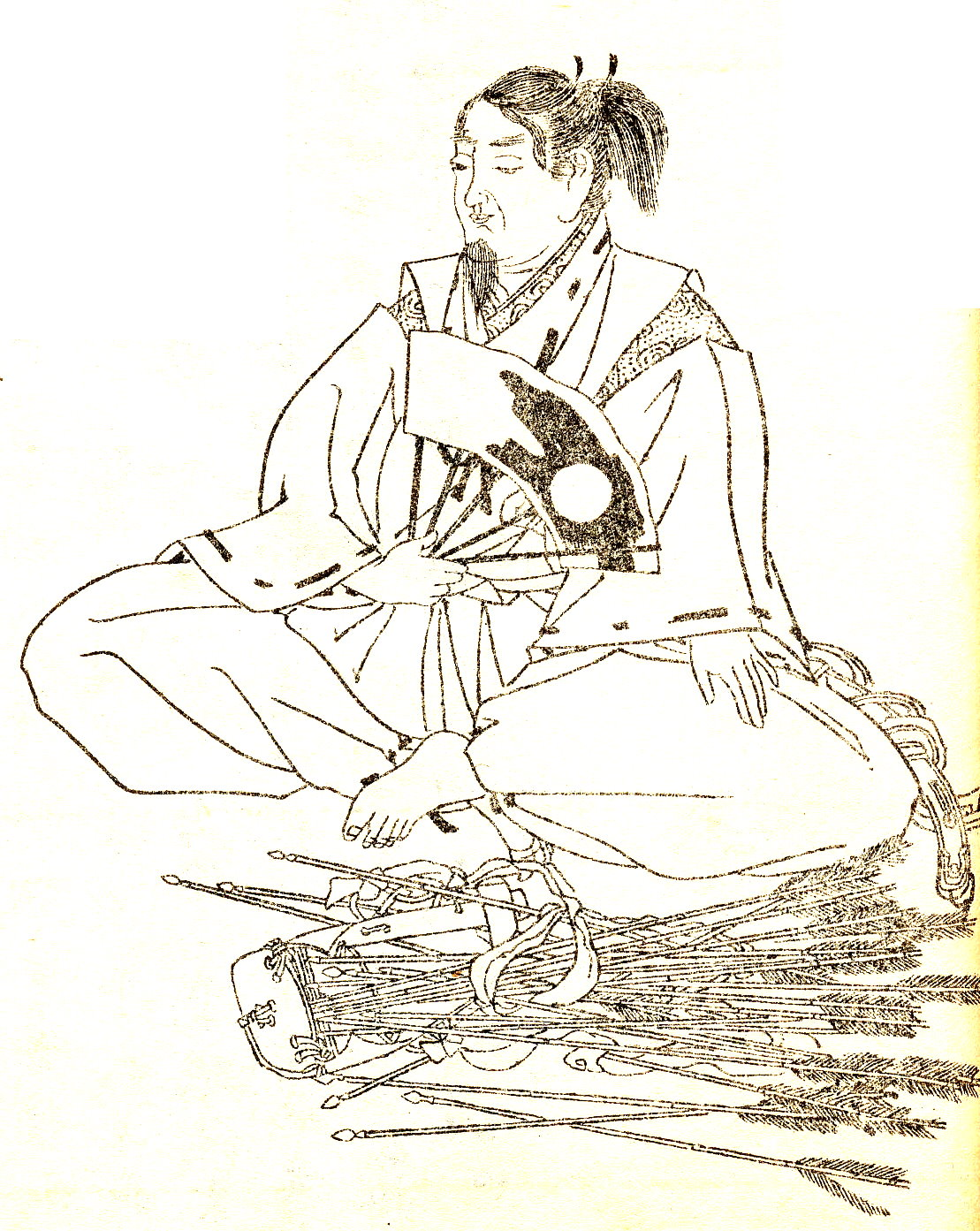
Minamoto no Tsunemoto drawn by Kikuchi Yosai

Minamoto no Tsunemoto (源 経基; 894–961) was a samurai and Imperial Prince during Japan's Heian period, one of the progenitors of the Seiwa Genji branch of the Minamoto clan. He was a son of Sadazumi-shinnō and grandson of Emperor Seiwa. Legend has it that Tsunemoto, in his childhood, was called Rokusonnō (六孫王), with roku (六, 'six') meaning that his father was the sixth son of Emperor Seiwa, and son (孫, 'grandson') meaning that he was a grandson of the Emperor.

Tsunemoto took part in a number of campaigns for the Imperial Court, including those against Taira no Masakado in 940 and against Fujiwara no Sumitomo the following year.

He held the title of Chinjufu-shōgun, or Commander-in-chief of the Defense of the North, and was granted the clan name of Minamoto by the Emperor in 961, the year he died.

Tsunemoto was the father of Minamoto no Mitsunaka.

== Family ==
- Father: Sadazumi-shinnō (貞純親王, 873?–916), "Prince Sadazumi", son of Emperor Seiwa
- Mother: Minamoto no Harako (源柄子), daughter of Minamoto no Yoshiari (源能有), son of Emperor Montoku
  - Wife: daughter of Tachibana no Shigefuru (橘繁古女) or daughter of Fujiwara no Toshinari (藤原敏有女)
  - Son: Minamoto no Mitsunaka (源満仲, 912–997)

== Honours ==
- Senior First Rank (December 17, 1701; posthumous)

== See also ==
- Momiji (oni)
