= Momiji (oni) =

Japanese kijo (female demon) from folklore

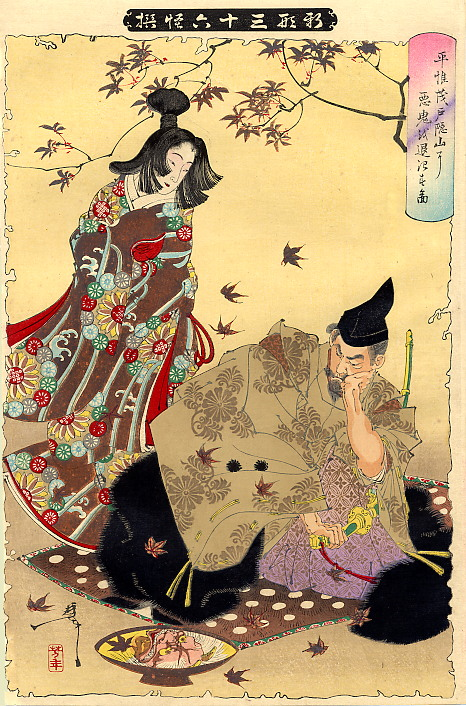
Taira no Koremochi falls asleep near Momiji disguised as a noblewoman. From "The Demon of Mount Togakushi" (平維茂戸隠山に悪鬼を退治す図), 1890, part of the New Forms of Thirty-six Ghosts series by Yoshitoshi Tsukioka.

Momiji (紅葉; "Maple Leaves") (Note: 紅葉 can be read both as "Momiji" and "Kōyō". While the former reading is well established as the name of the kijo, the latter is used too, e.g., in the modern light novel Fate/Requiem, as Kijo Kōyō.) is a prominent kijo (female demon) in Japanese folklore. Her story, known as the Legend of Momiji (紅葉伝説, Momiji Densetsu), is primarily associated with the regions of Kinasa, Togakushi (both now part of Nagano City), and Bessho Onsen in Nagano Prefecture. The central narrative involves the hero Taira no Koremochi battling and ultimately defeating the kijo named Momiji, who resided on Mount Togakushi.

== Origins and Development ==
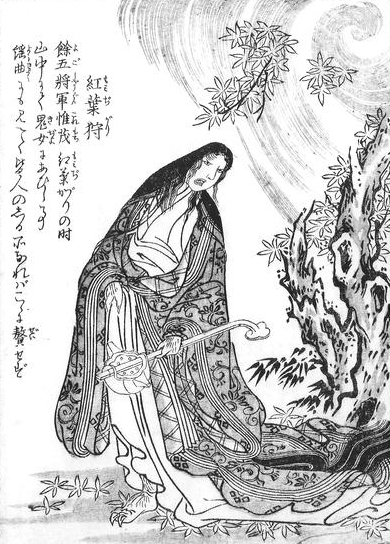
"Momijigari" from Toriyama Sekien's Konjaku Hyakki Shūi (1781).

The common element across most versions is a female demon named Momiji dwelling on Mount Togakushi in Shinano Province, who is eventually slain by the warrior Taira no Koremochi.

The legend gained significant prominence through adaptations in traditional performing arts. The Noh play Momijigari (Maple Viewing), likely composed by Kanze Nobumitsu in the latter half of the Muromachi period (1336–1573), is a cornerstone. This play depicts Koremochi encountering a group of noblewomen enjoying autumn maple viewing on Mount Togakushi, only to discover their leader is the disguised demon Momiji. While it's widely believed the Noh play drew upon pre-existing local legends of demons on Mount Togakushi, some scholars consider the specific narrative featuring Momiji as possibly originating with Nobumitsu. Numerous legendary sites related to Momiji around Togakushi are thought to have been established *after* the popularization of the story through Noh and other media.

Following the Noh play, the story was adapted into Jōruri puppet theatre and Kabuki. A notable Kabuki version, also titled Momijigari (1887) by Kawatake Mokuami, refers to the demoness as Sarashinahime (更科姫, Princess Sarashina).

=== Other Togakushi Demon Legends ===
Mount Togakushi itself has a rich history of demon legends predating or distinct from the Momiji story:

- The Asabashō (阿裟縛抄), a 13th-century text, mentions a practitioner named Gakumon (or Gakumon 学門/学問) in the mid-9th century who sealed a nine-headed, dragon-tailed demon within a cave (Iwayado) on the mountain. The demon later reformed as a benevolent water deity. This demon's tail supposedly reached an inlet named Ozaki in Echigo Province, where it was worshipped as Ozaki Gongen.
- The historical chronicle Taiheiki (late 14th century, Vol. 32) recounts how the warrior Tada Mitsunaka (Minamoto no Mitsunaka) slew a demon on Mount Togakushi and named his sword Onikiri (Demon Cutter) thereafter. This account significantly influenced the perception of Togakushi as a demon-infested place and likely impacted later legends, including those adapted for Noh.
- The Togakushisan Emaki (戸隠山絵巻, Picture Scroll of Mount Togakushi), a narrative scroll likely created around the Muromachi period and held by Togakushi Shrine, tells of a demon named Kyūshō Daiō (九生大王, Nine Lives Great King) who resided on the mountain during the reign of Empress Genshō (early 8th century). This demon was defeated by a minister named Kihi no Otodo (きひの大臣, likely representing Kibi Makibi or Ki no Ōtō). This story shows influences from Noh's Momijigari and the Shuten-dōji legend, including scenes where the demon's minions disguise themselves as women.

These varied traditions highlight Mount Togakushi's long association with powerful supernatural entities, providing a rich backdrop for the Momiji legend.

== The Legend of Momiji ==
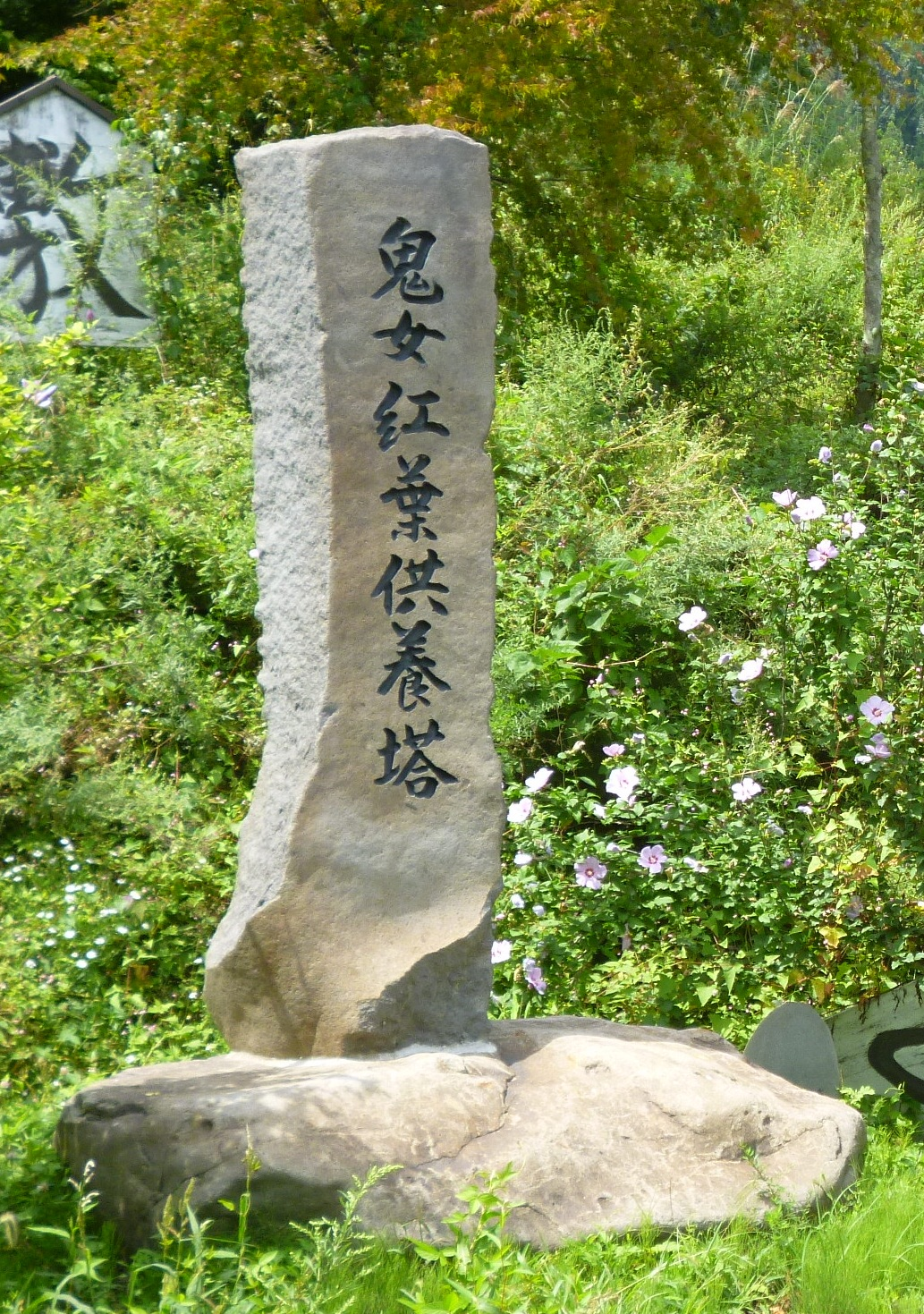
Memorial stupa for Kijo Momiji at the site of the former Dairi Mansion in the Negami district, former Kinasa village.

While numerous variations exist, a detailed narrative emerged, particularly popularized by the Meiji era publication Togakushiyama Kijo Momiji Taiji no Den (Account of the Miracles of Mount Kitamuki and the Subjugation of the Demoness Momiji of Mount Togakushi, published 1903, based on an 1886 manuscript) and retold in works like Iwaya Sazanami's Daigoen (大語園, 1935). This version provides an extensive backstory:

Momiji was originally named Kureha (呉葉 or 呉羽) and was said to be the sixth child of a couple named Sasayo Gozen and Hangu Iwami Hogan, descendants of the Ōtomo clan. Born around 937 CE, she possessed exceptional beauty and numerous talents, purportedly blessed by the power of the Demon King of the Sixth Heaven. Around age 16 (c. 953), she took the name Momiji and went to the capital, Kyoto. There, she attracted the attention of Minamoto no Tsunemoto, a powerful nobleman, eventually becoming his mistress and bearing his child, despite Tsunemoto already having an official wife (midaidokoro).

However, Tsunemoto's wife grew suspicious of Momiji, accusing her of using magic to harm her and plotting to usurp her position. While initially sentenced to death, Momiji's pregnancy led to her sentence being commuted to exile in the remote Shinano Province (c. 956).

She settled in the village of Minase in a secluded valley. Initially welcomed by the locals for her skills and courtly knowledge, she eventually gathered a band of followers and began raiding the surrounding areas, earning the moniker "Kijo" (demoness). Her activities became so disruptive that Emperor Reizei issued an imperial decree ordering her subjugation. The task fell to Taira no Koremochi, a renowned warrior. Koremochi found Momiji and her band difficult to defeat through conventional means due to their martial skills and potentially Momiji's supernatural powers. After praying to the gods at Bessho Onsen (specifically Kitamuki Kannon), Koremochi was granted a divine sword, the Gōma no Reiken (降魔の霊剣, Spirit Sword of Demon Subjugation). Armed with this sword, and possibly using deception (approaching her disguised as a traveler or monk while she was alone), Koremochi finally managed to defeat and kill Momiji. The village where she resided was subsequently renamed Kinasa (鬼無里), meaning "village without demons."

=== Legend Variants ===
- Kinasa Tradition: In the local folklore of Kinasa itself, Momiji is often portrayed more sympathetically as a "Kijo" (貴女, noblewoman) rather than a "Kijo" (鬼女, demoness). This version emphasizes her positive contributions: she healed the sick, taught reading, writing, arithmetic, and sewing, bringing Kyoto culture to the remote village. Her exile is attributed solely to the jealousy of Tsunemoto's official wife. The grateful villagers built her a residence called the Dairi Yashiki (内裏屋敷, Inner Palace Mansion) to resemble the imperial palace she missed.
- Wife of Gishiki Hachimen: Some traditions connect Momiji with another local demon figure, making her the wife of Gishiki Hachimen Daiō, a powerful oni said to have ruled the region in ancient times.
- Guardian Deity: According to the Zenkōji Dō Meisho Zue (Illustrated Guide to Famous Places along the Zenkōji Road, 1849), after her defeat, Momiji's spirit transformed into two Tengu, named Hachijōbō and Kujōbō. These tengu became attendants (kenzoku) of the deity Hiyoshi Gongen and protectors of Kitamuki Kannon temple in Bessho Onsen.

== Associated Locations ==
Numerous sites in Nagano Prefecture are linked to the Momiji legend:

=== Kinasa ===
- **Dairi Yashiki Ato**: Ruins of the mansion built for Momiji. A memorial stupa stands here.
- **Tsukiyo no Haka**: Tomb said to belong to Momiji's lady-in-waiting.
- **Yakabushi**: Site associated with the mansion's defenses or archery practice.
- **Kyoto Place Names**: Many local areas bear names reminiscent of Kyoto (Nishikyō, Tōkyō, Nijō, Sanjō, Shijō, Gojō, Fusei, Kiyomizu, Yoshida, Takao, Higashiyama), supposedly named by Momiji out of nostalgia.
- **Temples and Shrines**:

   *   Shōgan-ji [ja] (松巌寺): Temple dedicated to Momiji's memory, holding tombs for her and her retainers, and a Jizō Bosatsu statue she reputedly owned.[9]
   *   Kinasa Shrine, Shir髯 Jinja (Nagano) [ja]: Shrines where Koremochi prayed for victory.[7]

- **Kowashimizu & Koremochi Yanagi**: A spring where Koremochi drank, exclaiming "Kowai, kowai!" (local dialect for "I'm tired/This is tough"). A willow tree grew where he planted his toothpick.

=== Togakushi (Former Shigaramimura area) ===
The area around Mount Arakura (荒倉山, distinct from Mount Togakushi proper) is considered the main battleground.

- **Oni no Iwaya**: Cave where Momiji is said to have lived.
- **Oni no Tsuka**: Burial mound for Momiji and her followers.
- **Geographical Features**: Numerous rocks, springs, and plains bear names related to the legend: Keshozui (Cosmetic Water), Byōbuiwa (Folding Screen Rock), Butaiiwa (Stage Rock), Kamadaniwa (Cauldron Stand Rock), Kamashoiiwa (Cauldron Carrying Rock), Komatsumeiwa (Horse Hoof Rock), Oku no Iwaya (Inner Cave).
- **Battle Place Names**: Areas supposedly marking stages of the battle: Andogamine (Peak of Relief), Ryūkogahara (Dragon-Tiger Plain), Busu no Taira (Poison Plain), Kido (Gate), Ashitagahara (Morning Plain), Maku no Iri (Curtain Entrance), Shigaki (Fence), Shigarami (Weir), Watado (Crossing), Okkayō (Pursuit).
- **Temples and Shrines**:
- Daishō-ji: Also known as Momiji-hō (Maple Peak); holds memorial tablets naming both Momiji and Koremochi together, and large scrolls depicting their battle.
- Momiji Inari, Yama no Kami, Yasaki Shrine, Yamoto Shrine, Jūnisha Shrine: Shrines associated with prayers by Momiji or Koremochi.
- **Ashigami-sama**: A small shrine near Togakushi Shrine Chūsha (Middle Shrine) dedicated to "Oman," said to be one of Momiji's followers, worshipped as a deity of foot health.

=== Bessho Onsen, Nagano City, Kijimadaira ===
- **Taira no Koremochi's Tomb**: A mound in Ueda City (Bessho area) claimed to be the grave of Koremochi, who supposedly died from wounds sustained in the battle.
- **Kitamuki Kannon**: Temple in Bessho Onsen reputedly restored by Koremochi. It houses an ema (votive plaque) depicting the battle.
- **Temples with Art/Relics**: Saigon-ji (Nagano), Hōshō-ji (宝昌寺) in Nagano City, and Senshō-ji (宣勝寺) in Kijimadaira village possess scrolls depicting the Momiji-Koremochi battle. These temples are traditionally said to have been founded by Koremochi's descendants. Hōshō-ji also has an Armored Yakushi Nyorai statue attributed to Koremochi.

== Cultural Significance and Legacy ==
=== Shrine Rituals at Togakushi ===
- According to the travels of Sugae Masumi (late 18th-early 19th century, recorded in Kumeji no Hashi), Togakushi Shrine (then Kenkō-ji temple) held a "Momiji-e" (Maple Ceremony) on September 7, 8, and 9th. This commemorated Koremochi's victory, which supposedly occurred on July 7–9. During the ceremony, maple leaves were arranged in cups and offered for three days to appease Momiji's spirit. Afterwards, offering the leaves at the Iwaya cave was believed to make them magically appear at Ozaki in Echigo Province.
- The Zenkōji Dō Meisho Zue notes that during the "Shichigatsu-e" (Seventh Month Ceremony), the largest festival at Kenkō-ji/Togakushi Shrine, certain movements involving brandishing a naginata were performed, said to derive from Koremochi's actions during the demon subjugation.

=== Modern Festivals ===
The legend continues to be celebrated in local festivals:

- **Kinasa Kijo Momiji Matsuri**: Held annually on the 4th Sunday of October (13th time in 2012). Originally at the Dairi Yashiki site, now mainly at Shōgan-ji temple, featuring Buddhist services and performances like the Shinshū Kinasa Kijo Momiji Taiko drums.
- **Togakushi Kijo Momiji Matsuri**: Also held annually on the 4th Sunday of October (54th time in 2012), at the Arakura Campground. Includes food stalls and Noh performances (su-utai - chanting without music or dance) on a stage.

=== Adaptations in Arts ===
The Momiji legend, particularly through the Momijigari plays, has inspired numerous works:

- **Noh**: Momijigari (foundation for many later works)
- **Kabuki**: Momijigari (by Kawatake Mokuami, featuring Sarashinahime)
- **Film**: Momijigari (1899), a filmed scene from the Kabuki play starring Onoe Kikugorō V and Ichikawa Danjūrō IX. Directed by Tsunekichi Shibata, it is the oldest surviving Japanese film.
- **Kagura**: Performances titled Momijigari.
- **Jōruri**: Puppet theatre versions.
- **Painting**: Momijigari by Uemura Shōen (Bijinga).
- **Illustration**: Momijigari by Toriyama Sekien in Konjaku Hyakki Shūi.
- **Music**:

   *   "Kureha" (紅葉) by the band Onmyo-Za (lyrics & music by Matatabi), based on the legend and Kabuki play.
   *   "Kinasa no Michi" (鬼無里の道, Road of Kinasa) by Nishijima Mieko (lyrics by Satō Nobuhide).

- **Manga**: Onikirimaru by Kei Kusunoki features elements inspired by the legend.
- **Novel**: Togakushi Densetsu Satsujin Jiken (戸隠伝説殺人事件, The Togakushi Legend Murder Case) by Yasuo Uchida.

=== Historical Documentation ===
Key historical texts mentioning the legend or related traditions include:

- Wakan Sansai Zue (和漢三才図会, ca. 1712) - Vol. 68, Shinano, Togakushi Myōjin section.
- Shinpu Tōki (信府統記, official gazetteer of Matsumoto Domain, 1724) - Vol. 3, No. 17.
- Sugae Masumi Yūranki (菅江真澄遊覧記, Travel Records of Sugae Masumi, late 18th-early 19th c.) - Vol. 1, "Kumeji no Hashi".
- Shinano Kishō Roku (信濃奇勝録, Record of Curious Sights in Shinano, 1834).
- Zenkōji Dō Meisho Zue (善光寺道名所図会, 1849).
- Hokkouzan Reigenki Togakushiyama Kijo Momiji Taiji no Den Zen (北向山霊験記戸隠山鬼女紅葉退治之傳全, 1886 manuscript, pub. 1903).

== See also ==
- Kijo
- Oni
- Mount Togakushi
- Togakushi Shrine
- Taira no Koremochi
- Minamoto no Tsunemoto
- Momijigari (Noh)
- Momijigari (Kabuki)
- Momijigari (film)
- Shōgan-ji
- Daishō-ji
- Kinasa
- Togakushi

== Bibliography ==
- Komatsu, Kazuhiko; 小松和彦 (1992). Nihon yōkai ibunroku (Shohan ed.). Tōkyō: Shōgakkan. pp. 136–160. ISBN 4-09-207302-X. OCLC 27222958. (Provides overview and analysis)
- Kazuo Nakamura (1985). Genji densetsu no furusato : Shinshū Kinasa no denshō [The Hometown of the Genji Legend: Traditions of Shinshu Kinasa] (in Japanese). Nagano-ken Kamiminochi-gun Kinase-mura: Furusato-zōshi Kankōkai. OCLC 747897252. (Focuses on Kinasa traditions)
- Manpei Kaneko (1984). Kijo momiji densetsu no sato [The Village of the Kijo Momiji Legend] (in Japanese). Togakushi-mura (Nagano-ken): Kijomomijioshinobukaijimukyoku. OCLC 55861586. (Focuses on Togakushi traditions)
- Kazuo Nakamura (1991). Shōganji engi [History of Shōgan-ji] (in Japanese). OCLC 704060184. (History of the Kinasa temple)
- Furusato Zōshi Kankōkai (1989). Tani no kyō monogatari [Tales of the Valley Capital] (in Japanese). Kinasa-mura (Nagano-ken): Furusato Zōshi Kankōkai. OCLC 674256868.
- Kinasa Sonshi Henshū Iinkai (1967). Kinasa sonshi [History of Kinasa Village] (in Japanese). Kinasa-mura (Nagano-ken): Sankō Insatsu Kabushikigaisha insatsu. OCLC 123031724.
