= Bakotsu =

One of the 16 yōkai depicted in the Tosa Obake Zōshi, drawn during the Edo period

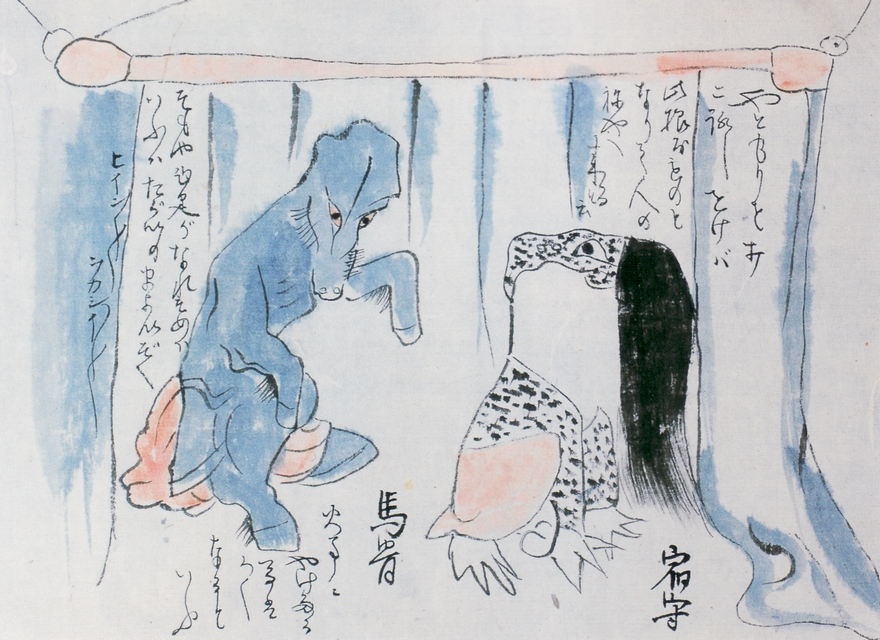
Bakotsu (馬骨, a A skeletal, flaming horse)

The Bakotsu (馬骨; lit. 'horse bone') is one of the 16 yōkai depicted in the Tosa Obake Zōshi, drawn during the Edo period; it appears as a skeletal, flaming horse, claimed to be the spirit of a horse that perished in a fire.

== In media ==
- St. Ethanbaron V. Nusjuro, one of the Five Elders in One Piece, takes the bakotsu as his monster form.
