= Yamajijii =

Japanese legendary creature

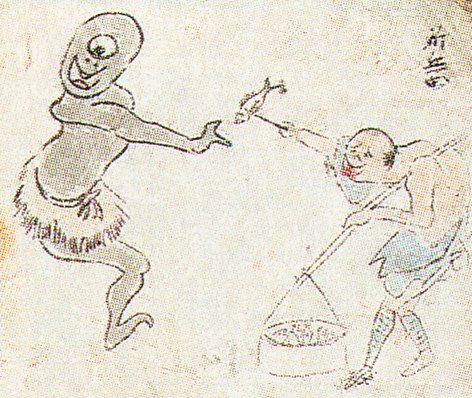
"Yamachichi" from the "Ehon Atsumegusa"

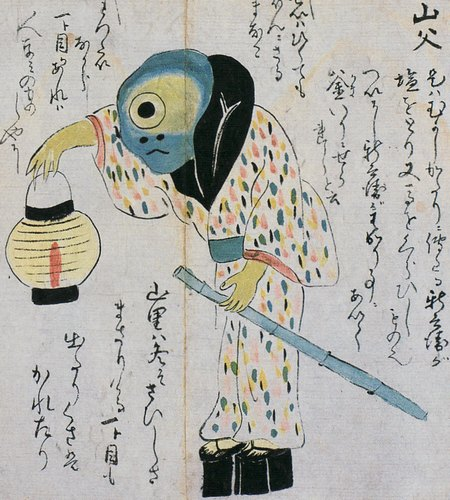
"Yamachichi" from the Tosa Obake Zōshi

Yamajijii (山爺) or Yamachichi (山父) (or, depending on the area, "yamanjii") is a type of yōkai.

== Summary ==
It is said to be a yōkai that takes on the appearance of an old man with one eye and one leg. According to the Early Modern Tosa Yōkai Documentation (近世土佐妖怪資料, Kinsei Tosa Yōkai Shiryou) published by the Tosa Folkloristics Department, with the Kōchi Prefecture being the first, it was passed down in Shikoku. It has a height of about three to four shaku (about 90–120 centimeters) with gray hair growing all over its body and, although it has two eyes, since one of them is large and the other is unusually small, it is seen as having just one eye. It is said that the legend where it has one eye is a misunderstanding of these two eyes that were seen as one eye and then passed down. Since it has teeth that could easily crush the bones of wild boar or a monkey, etc., hunters would tame this yamajijii with bait and use it to drive away wolves.

It would appear on roads where humans come and go, but they don't appear before people but rather leave round footprints about six or seven shaku apart that are about four shaku wide that are as if a mallet was pressed into it.

Worthy of special mention is its extravagantly large voice; should its voice echo around the mountains, it would shake the sky and earth, make leaves fall, and make the nearby trees and rocks move. It is said that there are some who have had their eardrums torn by this great voice and died. The yamajijii would sometimes engage in contests of seeing who has the larger voice and there's a folktale where a hunter attempted to show his voice by making a gunshot to defeat yamajijii in this contest. However, yamajijii, who noticed that he was deceived through a gunshot, shapeshifted into a spider and sneaked into the opponent's home and attacked his sleep in order to clear his resentment. Also, when the hunter prepared for the contest of comparing the loudness of voices, on the evening of New Year's Eve while praying at the Ise Hachiman Daibosatsu, he etched in the name "Ise Hachiman Daibosatsu" on a bullet that he made, which he carried around with him regularly. It is said that this bullet was something that a hunter in the past always carried with him and always hit even without aiming, but by carrying it around one would certainly encounter something strange like a yōkai and against a yamajijii, by making a threat by saying that one would fire this bullet, the yamajijii would shudder in fear and run away.

There is also a story where it reads people's minds. In the old book Ashū Kiji Zatsuwa from Tokushima, a yamachichi would appear where there are woodcutters in mountain houses. The woodcutter would get scared and wonder if he should kill it soon; the yamachichi would correctly read that thought one after another. But when an open fire flew off at the yamachichi, it was surprised that something happened that it was not able to read and ran away.

In personality, compared to the yamauba which is also a yōkai of the mountain that attacks humans, they are relatively quieter and they are sometimes deceived by humans, but there are also legends where they kidnap children or domestic animals. Also, like the yamauba, there are also theories that they bring fortune to people. In what was formerly Monobe, Kōchi Prefecture (now Kami), someone named Nakao received a takakibi (morokoshi) seed from a yamauba and by sowing it, a great harvest resulted. At the end of the year, a yamajijii appeared wanting mochi, so it was given a lot of it. The next year also had a great harvest and even more mochi was given to the yamajijii. In the end, as a result of this repeating many times, the yamajijii became able to eat three to (about 54.5 liters) of mochi and Nakao, who feared for his family finances, gave him burned stones which he presented as mochi and yamajijii, who was feeling hot, was given hot oil which was presented as tea. The yamajijii was surprised and fled, dying on the way. After that, the Nakao family, who once had abundant crops, declined at once.

In the yōkai tale Tosa Obake Zōshi written in Tosa Province (author unknown), there was a story where a man who carried a load with a horse fed the load to a yamachichi (yamajijii) and even fed the horse to it. The yamachichi in this book illustration was different from the legends; it was depicted with two legs (refer to image), but according to this the one in the legend was a yōkai with one eye and one leg and the one in folktales was a giant that had the same appearance as a human.

== See also ==
- Kui (Chinese mythology)
- List of legendary creatures from Japan
