= Yama-uba =

Japanese mythical creature

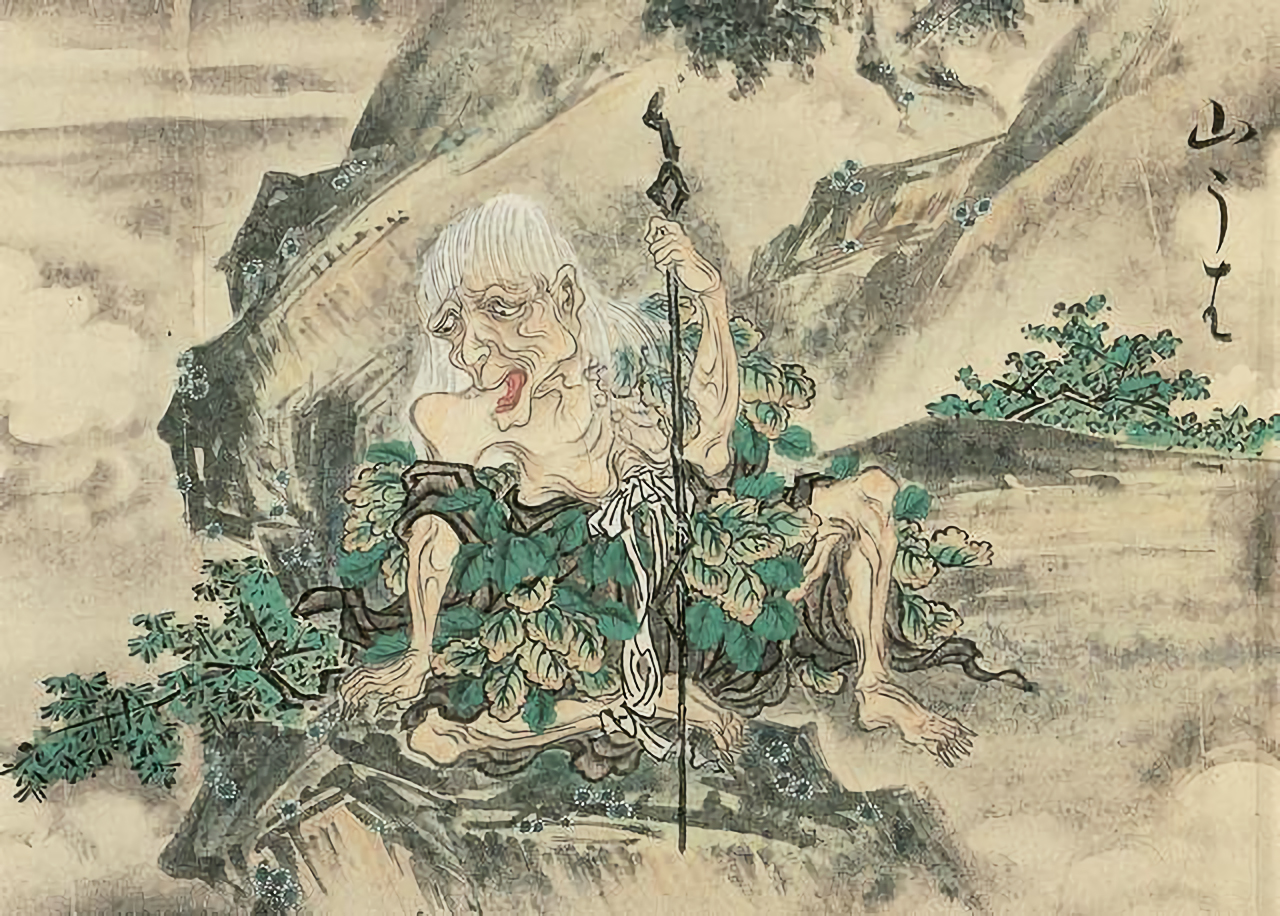
"Yamauba" (山うば) from the Hyakkai Zukan by Sawaki Suushi

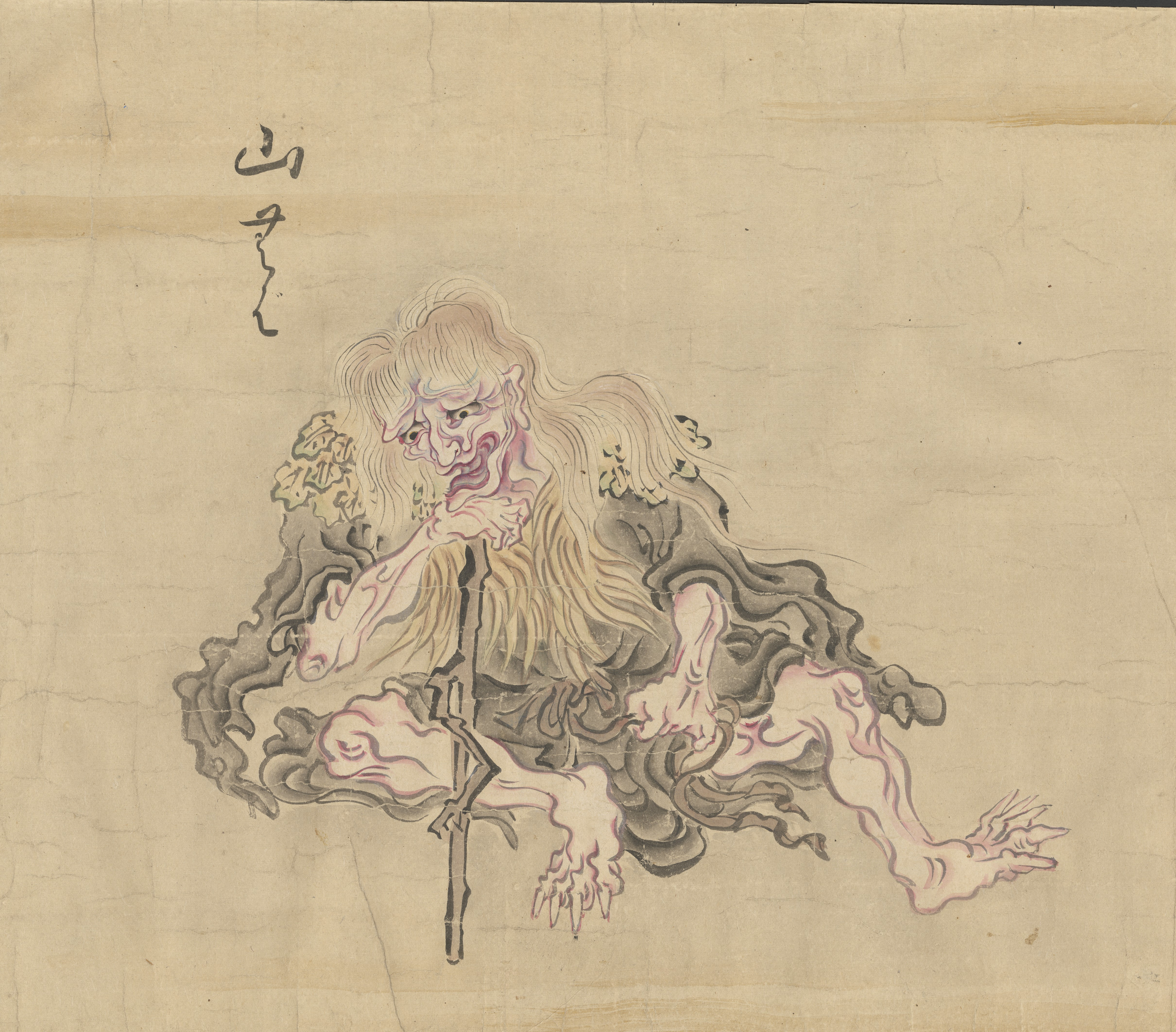
Yamamuba (山むば) from Bakemono no e (化物之繪, c. 1700), Harry F. Bruning Collection of Japanese Books and Manuscripts, L. Tom Perry Special Collections, Harold B. Lee Library, Brigham Young University.

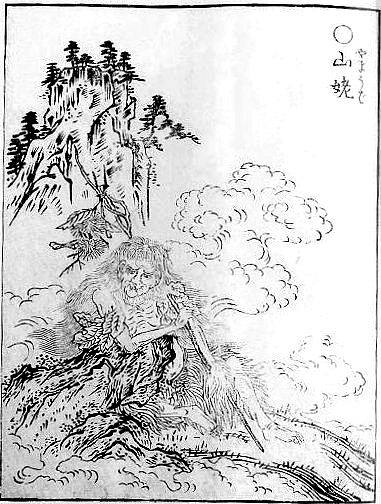
"Yamauba" (山姥) from the Gazu Hyakki Yagyō by Toriyama Sekien

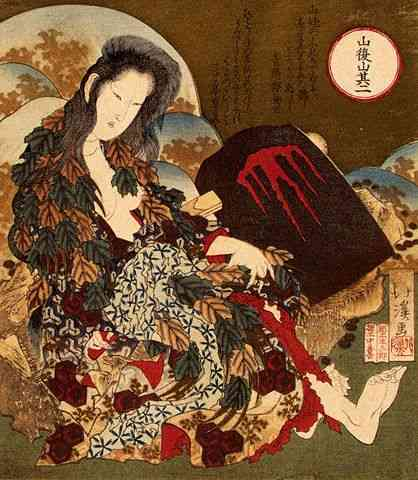
A depiction of Yama-uba by Totoya Hokkei (1780–1850)

Yamauba (山姥, 山うば, or 山女郎), yamamba, and yamanba are variations on the name of a yōkai found in Japanese folklore. Mostly said to resemble women, yamauba may be depicted as predatory monsters or benevolent beings.

== Appearance ==
Depending on the text and translator, the yamauba often appears as a monstrous crone, "her unkempt hair long and golden white ... her kimono filthy and tattered", with cannibalistic tendencies.

The yamauba is said to have a mouth at the top of her head, hidden under her hair. In one story, it is revealed that her only weakness is a certain flower containing her soul.

== Folklore ==
The people attacked by yamauba in folklore are typically travelers and merchants (such as ox drivers, horse drivers, coopers, and pedlars of notions) who often travel along mountain paths and encounter people in the mountains, so they are also thought to be the ones who had spread such tales.

In one tale, a mother traveling to her village is forced to give birth in a mountain hut assisted by a seemingly kind old woman, only to discover too late that the stranger is a yamauba, with plans to eat her helpless son Kintarō. In another story, the yōkai raises the orphan hero Kintarō, who goes on to become the famous warrior Sakata no Kintoki.

Yamauba have been portrayed in two different ways. There were tales where men stocking oxen with fish for delivery encountered yamauba at capes and were chased by them, such as the Ushikata Yamauba and the Kuwazu Jobo, as well as a tale where someone who was chased by a yamauba would climb a chain appearing from the skies in order to flee, and when the yamauba tried to make chase by climbing the chain too, she fell to her death into a field of buckwheat, called the "Tendo-san no Kin no Kusari". In these tales, the yamauba is a fearsome monster trying to eat humans.

On the other hand, there are tales such as the Nukafuku Komefuku (also called "Nukafuku Kurifuku"), where two sisters out gathering fruit meet a yamauba who gives treasure to the kind older sister (who was tormented by her stepmother) and curses the ill-mannered younger sister with misfortune. There is also the "Ubakawa" tale, where a yamauba gives a human good fortune.

=== By area ===
In the town of Masaeki (now Ebino) in Nishimorokata District, Miyazaki Prefecture, a yamahime (山姫; mountain princess) would wash her hair and sing in a lovely voice. Deep in the mountains of Shizuoka Prefecture, there is a tale that the yamahime would appear as a beautiful woman around twenty years of age, with black hair and an unusually coloured kosode. When an armed hunter found her and shot at her, she would catch the bullet with her hands.

In Hokkaido, Shikoku, and southern Kyushu, the yamauba is accompanied by a yamajijii (mountain old man) and a yamawaro (mountain child), and here the yamauba would be called a yamahaha (山母; mountain mother) and the yamajijii a yamachichi (山父; mountain father).

In Iwata District, Shizuoka Prefecture, there is a tale of a yamababa that would come and rest at a certain house. She was a gentle woman that wore clothes made of a tree's bark. She borrowed a cauldron to boil rice, but it could only fit two gō (361 milliliters) of rice. There wasn't anything else unusual about it, but it is said that when she sat to the side of it, the floor would creak.

In Hachijō-jima, a dejji or decchi would spirit people away by sending them to supposedly nonexistent places for an entire night, but if one were to become friendly with her, she would give them forage, among other things. She is also said to have nursed a child who went missing for three days. It is said that there are sores on her body, and her breasts are attached to her shoulders with tasuki.

In Kagawa Prefecture, yamauba within rivers are called kawajorō (川女郎; river ladies), and whenever a levee would fail, one would cry out, "My house is going to be washed away."

In Kumakiri, Haruno, Shūchi District, Shizuoka Prefecture (now Hamamatsu), there are legends of a yamauba called a hocchopā that would appear on mountain roads in the evening. Mysterious phenomena, such as the sounds of festivals and curses coming from the mountains, were considered to be because of this hocchopā.

Legends in Higashichikuma District, Nagano Prefecture tell of a yokai called an uba with long hair and one eye; from its name, it is thought to be a kind of yamauba.

In Kōchi Prefecture, there is a legend that a house possessed by a yamauba would quickly gain wealth and fortune, and some families have deified them as protective gods.

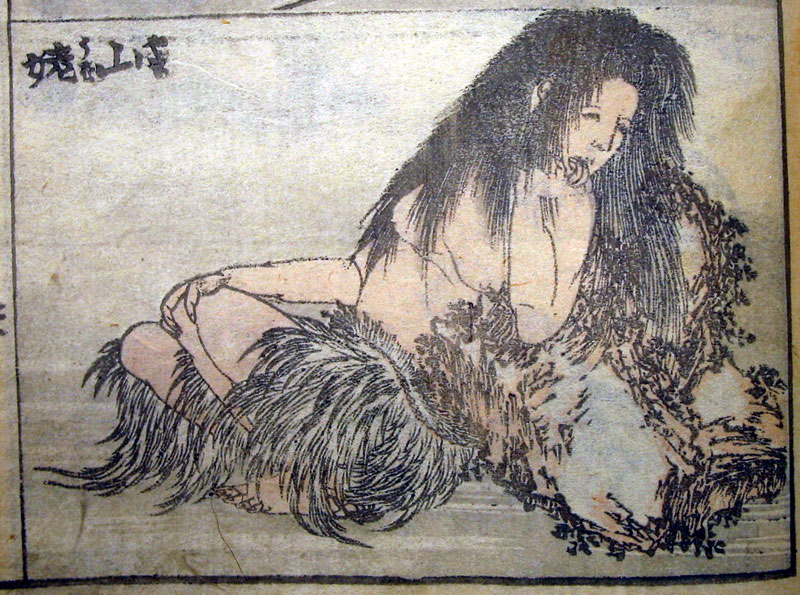
Yamauba, Hair Undone, by Hokusai

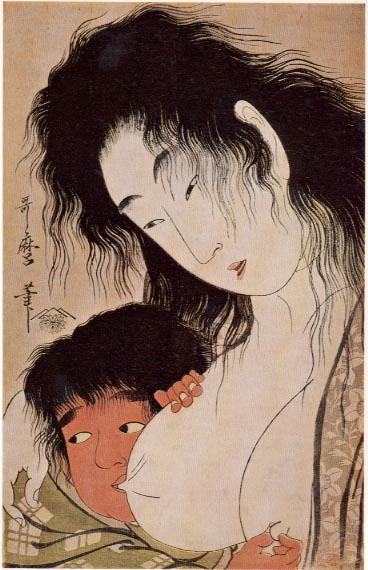
Yama-uba Nursing Kintoki, Kitagawa Utamaro 1802

== Noh drama ==
In one Noh drama, translated as Yamauba, Dame of the Mountain, Konparu Zenchiku states the following:

Yamauba is the fairy of the mountains, which have been under her care since the world began. She decks them with snow in winter, with blossoms in spring ... She has grown very old. Wild white hair hangs down her shoulders; her face is very thin. There was a courtesan of the Capital who made a dance representing the wanderings of Yamauba. It had such success that people called this courtesan Yamauba though her real name was Hyakuma.

The play takes place one evening as Hyakuma is traveling to visit the Zenko Temple in Shinano, when she accepts the hospitality of a woman who turns out to be none other than the real Yamauba herself.

== Western literature ==
Steve Berman's short story, "A Troll on a Mountain with a Girl" features a yamauba.

Lafcadio Hearn, writing primarily for a Western audience, tells a tale like this:

Then [they] saw the Yama-Uba,—the "Mountain Nurse." Legend says she catches little children and nurses them for awhile, and then devours them. The Yama-Uba did not clutch at us, because her hands were occupied with a nice little boy, whom she was just going to eat. The child had been made wonderfully pretty to heighten the effect. The spectre, hovering in the air above a tomb at some distance ... had no eyes; its long hair hung loose; its white robe floated light as smoke. I thought of a statement in a composition by one of my pupils about ghosts: "Their greatest peculiarity is that they have no feet." Then I jumped again, for the thing, quite soundlessly, but very swiftly, made through the air at me.

== See also ==
- Baba Yaga, a similar character from Slavic folklore
- Jynx, a Pokémon species inspired by Yama-uba
- Kurozuka, a similar onibaba, also known for cannibalism and infanticide
- Onibaba (film)
