= Kijo (folklore) =

Type of demon in Japanese mythology & folklore

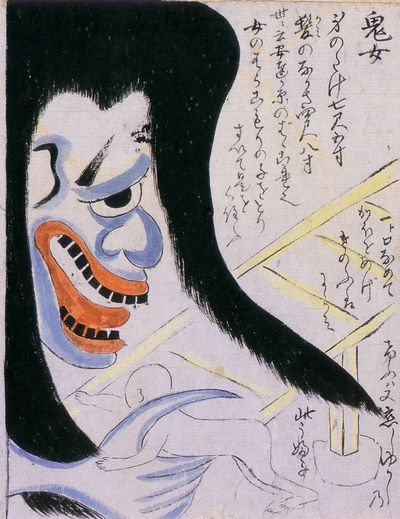
"Kijo" from the Tosa Obake Zōshi (author unknown)

A kijo (鬼女, lit. demon woman) is an oni woman from Japanese legends.

== Mythology ==
They are normally considered to be women who have turned into oni as a result of karma and resentment, with the younger ones being called "kijo" while the ones that look like old ladies are called onibaba (鬼婆, "demon hag"). They often appear in Japanese legends, folktales, fairy tales, and performing arts, and famous among them are Momiji (from The Legend of Momiji and Momijigari) from togakushi, Shinano Province (now the town of Kinasa, Nagano, Nagano Prefecture) and Suzuka Gozen from the Suzuka Mountains.

The onibaba of Adachigahara (Kurozuka) had "baba" in her name, but she is also considered a kijo. Also, the Tosa Obake Zōshi (author unknown) that spelled out tales of yōkai in Tosa Province (now Kōchi Prefecture) had, under the title of "Kijo," stated that an oni woman (kijo) with hair of a length 4 shaku and 8 sun (about 150 centimeters) ate a fetus from a pregnant woman, although the origin of this story is the onibaba legend of Adachigahara from Fukushima Prefecture that later spread to Tosa, and due to this spread, it became told about along with local legends there.

The word "kijo" is also used as a general term for women with hideous hearts like that of an oni.

== See also ==
- Baba Yaga
- Black Annis
- Boo Hag
- Crone
- Hag
- Kurozuka
- Muma Pădurii
- Onibaba (film)
- The Witch (fairy tale)
- Yama-uba
