= Tosa Obake Zōshi =

Yōkai emaki

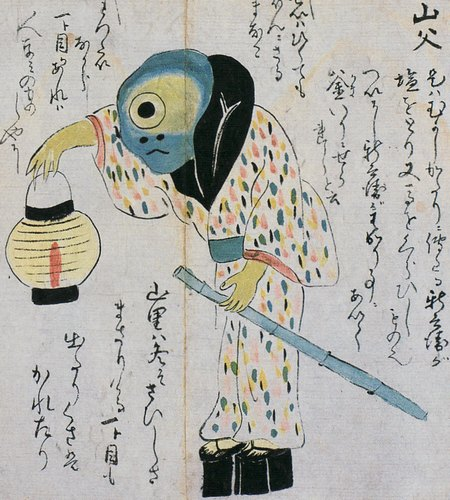
"Yamajijii" from the private collection version of "Tosa Obake Zōshi"

The Tosa Obake Zōshi (土佐お化け草紙; lit. 'Tosa ghost book') is a Japanese yōkai emaki (illustrated scroll). It was written by an unknown author and is set in Tosa Province (now Kōchi Prefecture), with 16 sections about yōkai in total; it was created during the Edo period. There are two editions, the private collection, originally owned by the Horimi family, and the collection of the Sakawa Education Committee of Sakawa, Kōchi Prefecture.

== Summary ==
At the opening of all sixteen yōkai tales, yōkai from each area of Japan gather at Tosa, and in the end, at dawn, the yōkai disperse, bringing each tale to its conclusion.

It is notable for collecting folktales from Tosa during the Edo period, including the Kechibi and the Yamajijii among others. Depictions of the Kechibi and the Yamajijii are uncommon in yōkai-genre pictorial works more broadly. The yōkai are presented with a rich local colouring, but it is a work that has attracted national interest as recounting iconic yōkai tales of the Edo period. The depictions present the yōkai as mischievously naive and playful, allowing the reader to feel close to the yōkai rather than as dreadful creatures.

Selected yōkai from Tosa Obake Zōshi
Name	Description	Tale
Old Crow (古烏, Kogarasu)	A crow that reaches 1,000 years old transforms into a human.	The transformed crow digs up the graves of the wicked and eats them.
Mountain Crocodile (山鰐, Yamawani)	A crocodile with a large mouth that can swallow anything in one bite.	The crocodile uses the catchphrase "lick lick lick" (なめなめなめ, name name name).
Kotoro Kotoro (子とろ子とろ)	A half-dressed woman with the severed head of a child in her mouth.	It is the embodiment of jealousy; she sneaks into the houses of those she envies to eat their children.
Horse Bone (馬骨, Bakotsu)	A skeletal, flaming horse.	It is said to be the spirit of a horse that perished in a fire.
Innkeeper (宿守, Yado Mori)	A toad, conversing with the skeletal horse.	If you kill a toad, the spirit will haunt your house as an innkeeper.
Boneless Woman (骨なし女, Hone nashi on'na)	Also known as the jellyfish woman; lost its bones through time.	They come to the houses of the deceased to play in the gardens.
Mamo (もふ, Mamō)	A bearded, fanged monster with messy hair.	The Nekomata Ichiname Mamofutoun (猫股 一名まもふと云) is an old ginger cat that changed its shape; it eats those with smallpox and the sleepy.

== Editions ==
=== Horimi (private collection) ===
It is estimated the private collection was composed during the period spanning from the middle to late Edo period. According to the postscript written when the end leaves were repaired after the war, the head karō of Tosa, the comber of the Fukao family, received this work from Masanari Eisuke, the 3rd from the Yoshimoto family, who worked for them for years since in Kan'en 2 (1749), and the sixth daughter of the Takehira family brought it into the family she married into, and from Heisei onwards, it has been passed down in that family. According to the postscript, it was used by a young lord for staying over the night, and the author is seen not as a famous artist of yōkai and yūrei and so on, but rather a nameless artist who lived in the countryside.

The Horimi family copy is held at the Kōchi Prefectural Museum of History.

=== Sawaka Education Committee ===
The works of the Sawaka Education Committee collection were made in Ansei 6 (1859), according to the statements in the end of the book. This is during approximately the same time period as the private collection and the yōkai tales stated earlier, and thus it is believed this emaki either was drawn in succession at that place, or was drawn as a copy of the private collection. However, because the sequence of tales and the characteristics of the yōkai are different than the private collection, it is not simply a reproduction; the chronology of the owners of the Sawaka Education Committee collection is also unclear, so how the book was drawn and passed down still awaits further research.
