= Iwate 4th district =

Legislative district of Japan

Iwate 4th District
- Former Parliamentary constituency for the Japanese House of Representatives
- Numbered map of Iwate Prefecture single-member districts
- Prefecture: Iwate
- Proportional District: Tohoku
- Electorate: 305,917

Former constituency
- Created: 1994
- Abolished: 2017
- Seats: One
- Party: ー
- Representative: ー
- Created from: Iwate's 2nd "medium-sized" district
- Municipalities: The cities of Hanamaki, Kitakami, Ōshū, and the districts of Waga and Isawa

Iwate 4th district was a constituency of the House of Representatives in the Diet of Japan (national legislature). It was located in southwestern Iwate and consisted of the cities of Hanamaki, Kitakami and Ōshū as well as the Waga and Isawa Districts. As of 2012, 305,917 eligible voters were registered in the district.

Before the electoral reform of 1994, the area had been part of Iwate 2nd district where three Representatives had been elected by single non-transferable vote. In a 2017 reapportionment, Iwate lost one seat and was subdivided into three districts. The area of the old 4th district is now part of the new 3rd district

The only representative for Iwate 4th district from its creation in 1996 to its abolition has been former Liberal Democratic Party secretary-general Ichirō Ozawa (LDP→JRP→NFP→LP→DPJ→LF→TPJ→PLP).

== List of representatives ==
Election	Representative	Party	Notes
1996	Ichirō Ozawa	NFP	
2000	Ichirō Ozawa	LP	
2003	Ichirō Ozawa	DPJ	
2005	Ichirō Ozawa	DPJ	
2009	Ichirō Ozawa	DPJ	
2012	Ichirō Ozawa	TPJ	
2014	Ichirō Ozawa	PLP	

== Election results ==
2014
Party	Candidate	Votes	%	±%
People's Life	Ichirō Ozawa	75,293	47.8	
LDP	Takashi Fujiwara (endorsed by Komeito) (elected by PR)	57,824	36.7	
JCP	Tsunaki Takahashi	24,421	15.5	

2012
Party	Candidate	Votes	%	±%
Tomorrow	Ichirō Ozawa (endorsed by NPD)	78,057	45.5	
LDP	Takashi Fujiwara (elected by PR)	47,887	27.9	
Democratic	Toshiaki Oikawa	28,593	16.7	
JCP	Kōki Takahashi	17,033	9.9	

2009
Party	Candidate	Votes	%	±%
Democratic	Ichirō Ozawa (supported by PNP)	133,978		
LDP	Yoshinobu Takahashi (endorsed by Komeito)	41,690		
Social Democratic	Senryū Obara	28,925		
JCP	Sadakiyo Segawa	8,288		
Happiness Realization	Akira Yasunaga	1,280		
Turnout		216,754	76.18	

2005
Party	Candidate	Votes	%	±%
Democratic	Ichirō Ozawa	124,578		
LDP	Tokuichirō Tamazawa	48,093		
Social Democratic	Kōki Kubo	23,727.697		
JCP	Kōki Takahashi	11,420.291		
Turnout		210,247	73.36	

2003
Party	Candidate	Votes	%	±%
Democratic	Ichirō Ozawa	128,458		
LDP	Tokuichirō Tamazawa	37,251		
Social Democratic	Kōki Kubo	20,936.334		
JCP	Kōki Takahashi	10,642.653		
Turnout		200,128	69.87	

2000
Party	Candidate	Votes	%	±%
Liberal	Ichirō Ozawa	119,099		
Social Democratic	Yukihiro Kimura	37,417		
LDP	Kōichi Igata	28,926		
JCP	Ryōko Sakamoto	14,051		

1996
Party	Candidate	Votes	%	±%
New Frontier	Ichirō Ozawa	125,619		
Social Democratic	Reijirō Sawafuji	38,482		
LDP	Kōichi Igata	20,179		
JCP	Natsuko Yaegashi	9,933		
Turnout		197,093	71.45	
