= Tonomi Palisade =

Heian period castle in Isawa, Honshū, Japan

- 鳥海柵
- Kanegasaki, Iwate Prefecture, Japan
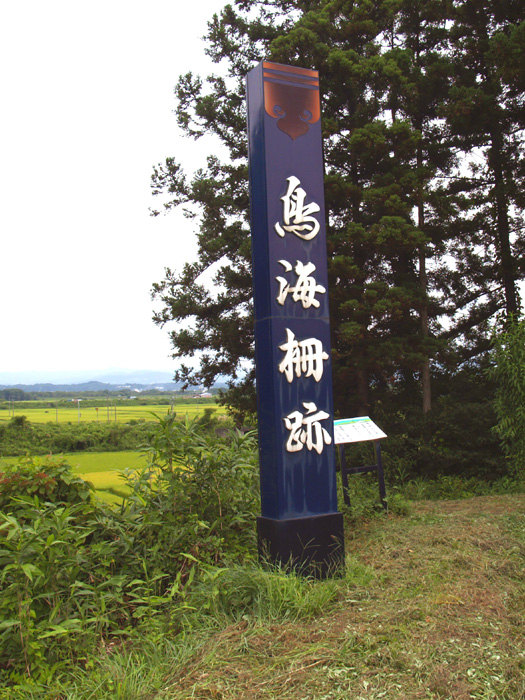

Site information
- Type: jōsaku-style Japanese castle
- Open to the public: yes
- Condition: ruins

Location
- Coordinates: 39.6073°N 141.1721°E

Site history
- Built by: Abe no Yoritoki
- In use: early Heian period
- Demolished: unknown

Tonomi Palisade (鳥海柵, Tonomi-no-saku) was an early Heian period jōsaku-style Japanese castle located in what is now the town of Kanegasaki in Isawa District, Iwate Prefecture in far northern Honshū, Japan. The site was proclaimed a National Historic Site of Japan in October 2013.

== Background ==
In the late Nara period, after the establishment of a centralized government under the Ritsuryō system, the imperial court sent a number of military expeditions to what is now the Tōhoku region of northern Japan to bring the local Emishi tribes under its control. Some Emishi tribes sided with the Yamato forces, and these allied tribes were known as Fushū (俘囚). By the early 11th century, the Abe clan, who had grown enormously wealthy by monopolizing the gold, iron and horse trade in northern Honshū, had emerged as the ruler of these fushū, and were assigned the six Emishi districts (Iwate, Hienuki, Shiwa, Isawa, Esashi and Waga) in the Kitakami Basin from what is now Morioka to Hiraizumi in Iwate Prefecture. The Abe clan eventually began to raid territories south of their border. In 1051 Abe no Yoritoki led an army into northern Miyagi and defeated a government army that had been sent to stop the raids. This event triggered the Former Nine Years' War (Zenkunen War. Abe no Yoritoki constructed twelve jōsaku-style fortresses against the Minamoto clan, whose leader Minamoto no Yoriyoshi was deputized as the Chinjufu Shogun and sent at the head of a new army to assert central government control over their territories. Of these twelve fortifications, only that of the Tonami Palisade is known. The fortification was assigned to Abe no Yoritoki's third son, Abe no Munetō. In July 1057, Abe no Yoritoki was hit by a stray arrow, and retreated to the Tonami Palisade where he died. In 1061, Abe no Munetō defeated the Minamoto forces in the Battle of Tonomi Palisade.

Yoritoki's sons continued fighting for a time but were finally overwhelmed by combined Minamoto and Kiyowara armies in 1062.

== Description ==
Tonomi Palisade is located approximately 2.5 kilometers west-northwest of the conjunction of the Kitakami River and the Isawa River. It was a roughly rectangular enclosure, approximately 500 meters north-south by 300 meters east-west, surrounded by an earthen rampart surmounted by a wooden palisade and moat. Nothing remains of Tonomi Palisade today. The Tohoku Expressway cuts through the middle of site, which is also bordered on one side by Japan National Route 4. The site has been excavated some 19 times between 1958 and 2012, and was backfilled after each excavation. The site is located about 10 minutes by car from Kanegasaki Station on the JR East Tohoku Main Line.

== See also ==
- Emishi
- Taga Castle
- List of Historic Sites of Japan (Iwate)
