= Isawa =

Isawa may refer to:

== Religion ==
- Aissawa, a Sufi order in Morocco
- Isawa (Nigeria), an Islamic subgroup in Nigeria

== Iwate Prefecture ==
- Isawa District, Iwate, a district of Iwate Prefecture, Japan
- Isawa, Iwate, a former town, now part of Oshu City, Iwate Prefecture
- Isawa River, a river in Iwate Prefecture

== Yamanashi Prefecture ==
- Isawa, Yamanashi, a former town, now a part of Fuefuki City, Yamanashi Prefecture, Japan
- Isawa-onsen Station, a railway station on the JR Chūō Main Line in Yamanashi Prefecture
