= Teruhisa =

- Gender: Male

Origin
- Origin: Japanese
- Meaning: Different meanings depending on the kanji used

Teruhisa (written: 輝久, 照久, 煌久 or 勘之亟) is a masculine Japanese given name. Notable people with the name include:

- Kairyūyama Teruhisa (開隆山 勘之亟) (1939–1986), Japanese sumo wrestler
- Teruhisa Hiroi (廣井 照久) (born 1954), Japanese author and video game developer
- Teruhisa Komatsu (小松 輝久) (1888–1970), Imperial Japanese Navy admiral
- Teruhisa Matsusaka (松阪 輝久) (1926–2006), Japanese-born American mathematician
- Teruhisa Moriyama (森山 輝久) (born 1942), Japanese volleyball player
- Oikawa Teruhisa (及川 煌久) (born 1936), Japanese sumo wrestler
- Teruhisa Tsuyusaki (露崎 照久) (born 1965), Japanese voice actor
