= Rikuchū-Orii Station =

Railway station in Ōshu, Iwate Prefecture, Japan

Rikuchū-Orii Station 陸中折居駅
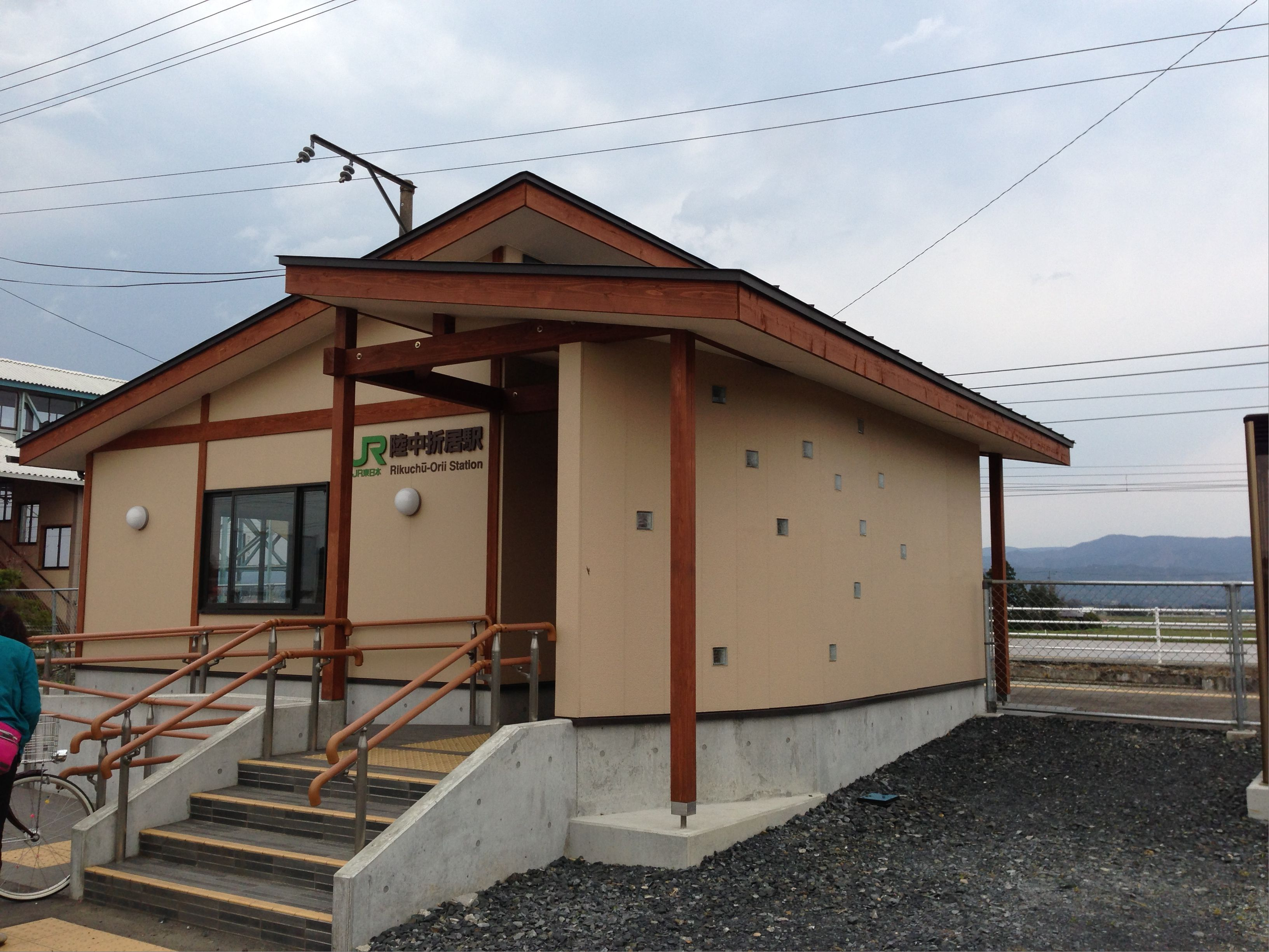
- Rikuchū-Orii Station, May 2013

General information
- Location: Mizusawa-ku Shinjo-aze, Ōshū-shi, Iwate-ken 023-0841; Japan
- Coordinates: 39.0942°N 141.1407°E
- Operator: JR East
- Line: ■ Tōhoku Main Line
- Distance: 465.1 km from Tokyo
- Platforms: 2 side platforms
- Tracks: 2

Other information
- Status: Unstaffed
- Website: Official website

History
- Opened: 25 November 1928

Services
Preceding station	JR East	Following station
Maesawa towards Kuroiso	Tōhoku Main Line Local	Mizusawa towards Morioka
Location
- Location within Iwate Prefecture Location within Japan

Rikuchū-Orii Station (陸中折居駅, Rikuchū-Orii-eki) is a railway station in the city of Ōshū, Japan, operated by East Japan Railway Company (JR East).

== Lines ==
Rikuchū-Orii Station is served by the Tōhoku Main Line and is located 465.1 rail kilometers from the terminus of the line at Tokyo Station.

== Station layout ==
Rikuchū-Orii Station is an unattended station that has two opposed side platforms connected to the station building by a footbridge.

=== Platforms ===
1	■ Tōhoku Main Line	for Kitakami and Morioka
2	■ Tōhoku Main Line	for Hiraizumi and Ichinoseki

== History ==
Rikuchū-Orii Signal stop was opened on 15 January, 1924, and elevated to a full passenger station opened on 25 November, 1928. The station was absorbed into the JR East network upon the privatization of the Japanese National Railways (JNR) on 1 April, 1987. The station building was heavily damaged by the 2011 Tōhoku earthquake and tsunami, and a new station building was completed in December 2011.

== Surrounding area ==
- Kitakami River
- Maesawa High School

== See also ==
- List of railway stations in Japan
