= Rokuhara Station =

Railway station in Kanegasaki, Iwate Prefecture, Japan

Rokuhara Station 六原駅
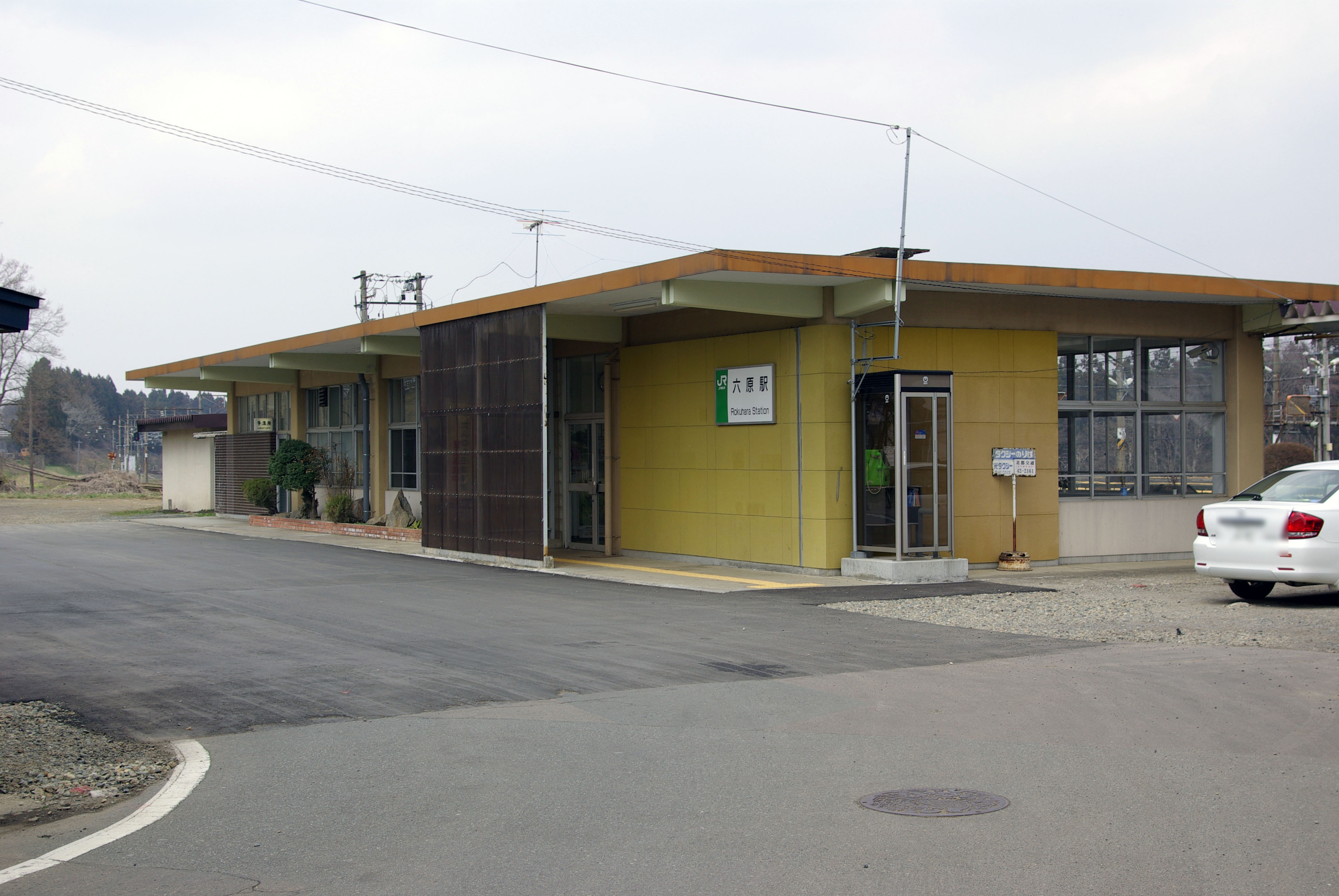
- Rokuhara Station, May 2009

General information
- Location: Mikajiri, Kanegasaki-machi, Isawa-gun, Iwate-ken 029-4502; Japan
- Coordinates: 39.2277°N 141.0978°E
- Operator: JR East
- Line: ■ Tōhoku Main Line
- Distance: 481.1 km from Tokyo
- Platforms: 1 side + 1 island platform
- Tracks: 3

Construction
- Structure type: At grade

Other information
- Status: Unstaffed
- Website: Official website

History
- Opened: 1 February 1937

Passengers
- FY2017: 233 daily

Services
Preceding station	JR East	Following station
Kanegasaki One-way operation	Tōhoku Main Line Rapid Aterui	Kitakami towards Morioka
Kanegasaki towards Kuroiso	Tōhoku Main Line Local	Kitakami towards Morioka
Location
- Location within Iwate Prefecture Location within Japan

Rokuhara Station (六原駅, Rokuhara-eki) is a railway station in the town of Kanegasaki, Iwate Prefecture, Japan, operated by the East Japan Railway Company (JR East).

== Lines ==
Rokuhara Station is served by the Tōhoku Main Line, and is located 481.1 rail kilometers from the terminus of the line at Tokyo Station.

== Station layout ==
The station has an island platform and a single side platform serving three tracks, connected to the station building by a footbridge. The station is unattended.

=== Platforms ===
1	■ Tōhoku Main Line	for Kitakami and Morioka
2	■ Tōhoku Main Line	(passing loop)
3	■ Tōhoku Main Line	for Mizusawa and Ichinoseki

== History ==
Rokuhara Station was elevated from a signal stop to a passenger station on 1 February 1937. The station was absorbed into the JR East network upon the privatization of the Japanese National Railways (JNR) on 1 April 1987.

== Passenger statistics ==
In fiscal 2017, the station was used by an average of 233 passengers daily (boarding passengers only).

== Surrounding area ==
- Kitakami River
- National Route 4
- Tōhoku Expressway

== See also ==
- List of railway stations in Japan
