= Kanegasaki Station =

Railway station in Kanegasaki, Iwate Prefecture, Japan

Kanegasaki Station 金ヶ崎駅
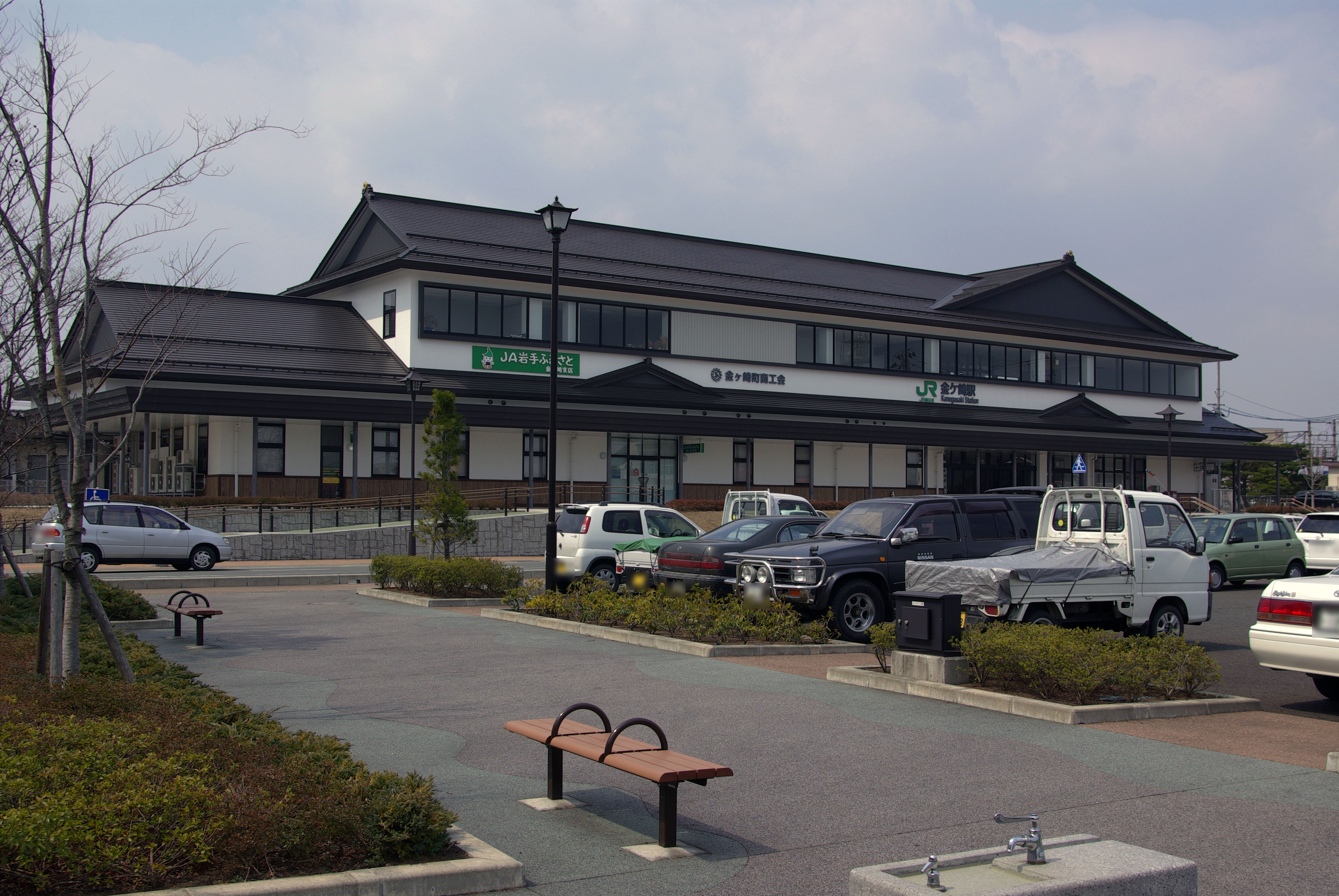
- Kanegasaki Station, March 2007

General information
- Location: Nishine Sugidote 2-1, Kanegasaki-machi, Isawa-gun, Iwate-ken 029-4503; Japan
- Coordinates: 39.1995°N 141.1130°E
- Operator: JR East
- Line: ■ Tōhoku Main Line
- Distance: 477.7 km from Tokyo
- Platforms: 2 side platforms
- Tracks: 2

Construction
- Structure type: At grade

Other information
- Status: Staffed
- Website: Official website

History
- Opened: 1 July 1897

Passengers
- FY2018: 584 daily

Services
Preceding station	JR East	Following station
Mizusawa One-way operation	Tōhoku Main Line Rapid Aterui	Rokuhara towards Morioka
Mizusawa towards Kuroiso	Tōhoku Main Line Local	Rokuhara towards Morioka
Location
- Location within Iwate Prefecture Location within Japan

Kanegasaki Station (金ヶ崎駅, Kanegasaki-eki) is a railway station in the town of Kanegasaki, Iwate Prefecture, Japan, operated by East Japan Railway Company (JR East).

== Lines ==
Kanegasaki Station is served by the Tōhoku Main Line, and is located 477.7 rail kilometers from the terminus of the line at Tokyo Station.

== Station layout ==
The station is an elevated station and has two opposed side platforms. The station is staffed.

=== Platforms ===
1	■ Tōhoku Main Line	for Mizusawa and Ichinoseki
2	■ Tōhoku Main Line	for Kitakami and Morioka

== History ==
Kanegasaki Station was opened on 1 July 1897. The station was absorbed into the JR East network upon the privatization of the Japanese National Railways (JNR) on 1 April 1987. A new station building was completed in November 2004.

== Passenger statistics ==
In fiscal 2018, the station was used by an average of 584 passengers daily (boarding passengers only).

== Surrounding area ==
- Kanegasaki Town Hall
- Isawa River
- Kitakami River
- National Route 4
- Tōhoku Expressway

== See also ==
- List of railway stations in Japan
