= Mizusawa Station =

Railway station in Ōshu, Iwate Prefecture, Japan

Mizusawa Station 水沢駅
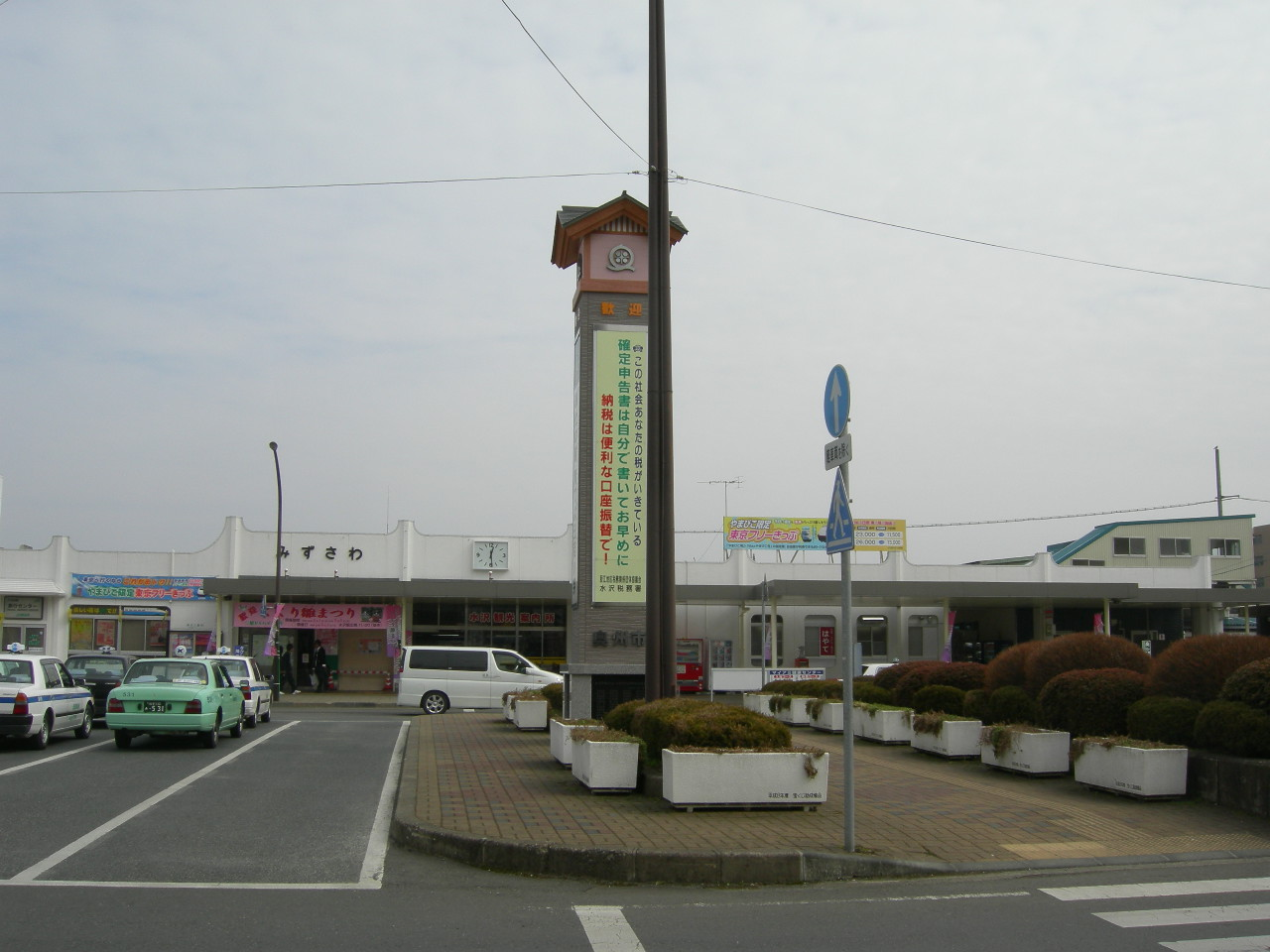
- Mizusawa Station in March 2007

General information
- Location: 1-9-1 Higashiodori, Mizusawa-ku, Ōshū-shi, Iwate-ken 023-0828; Japan
- Coordinates: 39.1392°N 141.1462°E
- Operator: JR East
- Line: ■ Tōhoku Main Line
- Distance: 470.1 km from Tokyo
- Platforms: 1 side + 1 island platforms
- Tracks: 3

Other information
- Status: Staffed ("Midori no Madoguchi")
- Website: Official website

History
- Opened: 1 November 1890

Passengers
- FY2018: 1,859 daily

Services
Preceding station	JR East	Following station
Terminus	Tōhoku Main Line Rapid Aterui	Kanegasaki towards Morioka
Rikuchū-Orii towards Kuroiso	Tōhoku Main Line Local	Kanegasaki towards Morioka
Location
- Location within Iwate Prefecture Location within Japan

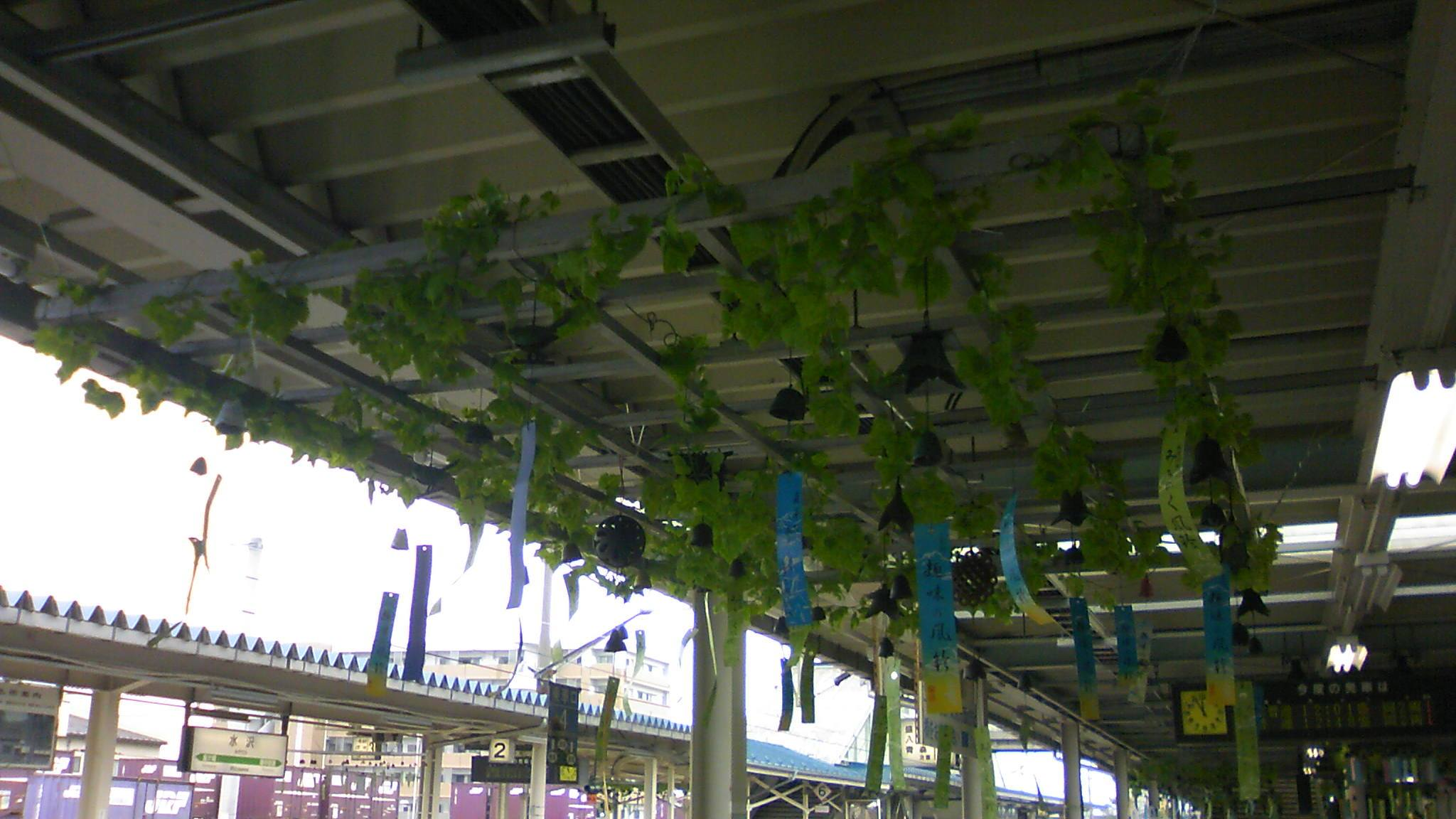
Wind chimes at the Mizusawa Station platform

Mizusawa Station (水沢駅, Mizusawa-eki) is a railway station in the city of Ōshū, Iwate Prefecture, Japan, operated by East Japan Railway Company (JR East).

== Lines ==
Mizusawa Station is served by the Tōhoku Main Line, and is located 470.1 km (292.1 mi) from the starting point of the line at Tokyo Station.

== Station layout ==
The station has an island platform and a single side platform, connected to the station building by a footbridge. The station is staffed and has a Midori no Madoguchi staffed ticket office. The station is noted for the numerous nambu fūrin (Japanese wind chimes), and the station is listed as one of the 100 Soundscapes of Japan.

=== Platforms ===
1, 2	■ Tōhoku Main Line	for Kitakami and Morioka
3	■ Tōhoku Main Line	for Hiraizumi and Ichinoseki

== History ==
Mizusawa station opened on 1 November 1890. The station was absorbed into the JR East network upon the privatization of the Japanese National Railways (JNR) on 1 April 1987.

== Passenger statistics ==
In fiscal 2018, the station was used by an average of 1,859 passengers daily (boarding passengers only).

== Surrounding area ==
- Mizusawa Post office
- Ōshū City Office
- Kitakami River
- National Route 4
- National Route 297

== See also ==
- List of railway stations in Japan
