= Iwate 3rd district =

Japan House of Representatives constituency

Parliamentary constituencies in Iwate Prefecture

Iwate 3rd district is a constituency of the House of Representatives in the Diet of Japan (national legislature). It is located in Iwate.

Ichirō Ozawa of the Liberal Party took the seat in the constituency after his original seat in the Iwate 4th district was abolished in the 2017 general election. Previously, the seat was held by Toru Kikawada of the Democratic Party (DPJ) since 2000.

== Area ==
Located in Southwestern Iwate, the district includes the entire abolished 4th district. Only Ichinoseki City and Hiraizumi Town were retained in the 3rd after the 2017 redistricting, other municipalities were transferred to the Iwate 2nd district.

=== Cities ===
- Hanamaki
- Kitakami
- Ichinoseki
- Ōshū

=== Towns ===
- Nishiwaga
- Kanegasaki
- Hiraizumi

== List of representatives ==
Election	Representative	Party	Notes
1996	Yōhei Sasaki	NFP	
2000	Toru Kikawada	LP	
2003	Toru Kikawada	DPJ	
2005	Toru Kikawada	DPJ	
2009	Toru Kikawada	DPJ	
2012	Toru Kikawada	DPJ	
2014	Toru Kikawada	DPJ	
2017	Ichirō Ozawa	Independent	
2021	Takashi Fujiwara	LDP	
2024	Ichirō Ozawa	CDP	Failed to win a seat in the PR Block
2026	Takashi Fujiwara	LDP	

== Election results ==
2026
Party	Candidate	Votes	%	±%
LDP	Takashi Fujiwara	102,578	48.6	▲6.37
Centrist Reform	Ichirō Ozawa	78,731	37.3	▼20.47
Sanseitō	Taisuke Oikawa	29,831	14.1	
Registered electors		358,351		
Turnout		211,140	60.26	▲3.38
LDP gain from Centrist Reform				

2024
Party	Candidate	Votes	%	±%
CDP	Ichirō Ozawa	115,364	57.77	▲9.82
LDP	Takashi Fujiwara	84,347	42.23	▼9.82
Registered electors		364,074		
Turnout		199,711	56.80	▼4.83
CDP gain from LDP				
