= Esashi, Iwate =

Esashi 江刺市
- Former municipality
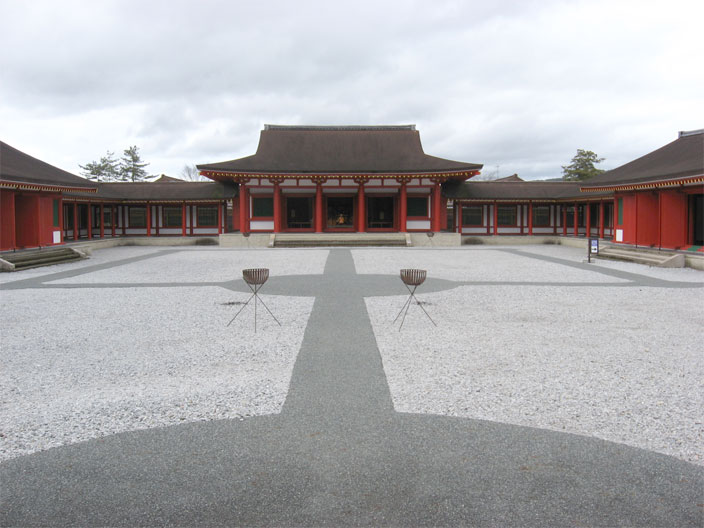
- Esashi Fujiwara-no-sato

- Flag Emblem

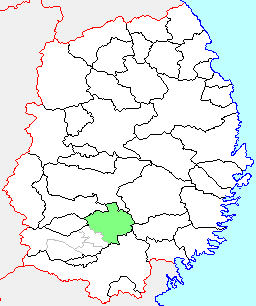
- Location of Esashi in Iwate Prefecture

- Location in Japan
- Coordinates: 39°11′27.7″N 141°10′30.3″E
- Country: Japan
- Region: Tōhoku
- Prefecture: Iwate Prefecture
- Merged: February 20, 2006 (now part of Ōshū)

Area
  - Total: 362.50 km^{2} (139.96 sq mi)

Population (September 1, 2005)
  - Total: 32,457
  - Density: 89.54/km^{2} (231.9/sq mi)
- Time zone: UTC+09:00 (JST)
- Climate: Cfa/Dfa
- Symbols
- Bird: Common cuckoo
- Flower: Sakura
- Tree: Zelkova serrata

Esashi (江刺市, Esashi-shi) was a city located in Iwate Prefecture, Japan. It is currently part of the city of Ōshū.

Esashi village was created within Esashi District on April 1, 1899 with the establishment of the municipalities system. On February 10, 1955, it annexed the neighboring town of Iwayado and the villages of Inase, Atago, Tahara, Hirose, Sunagawa, Tamasato, Fujisato, Yonesato and Ide to form Esashi town. Esashi was raised to city status on November 3, 1958.

On February 20, 2006, Esashi, along with the city of Mizusawa, the towns of Isawa and Maesawa, and the village of Koromogawa (all from Isawa District), was merged to create the city of Ōshū, and no longer exists as an independent municipality.

As of February 2006, the city had an estimated population of 32,457 and a population density of 89.54 persons per km^{2}. The total area was 362.50 km^{2}.

== Local attractions ==
- Esashi contains a number of artifacts pertaining to the Northern Fujiwara clan, which dominated the Tohoku region in the Heian period. The Esashi Fujiwara no Sato is a theme park featuring buildings such as fortifications, palace structures, and government offices, which have been recreated to the past design.
- Kurofune Square is a collection of black-and-white buildings. In style, these structures resemble storerooms. This feature of the design was chosen to impart uniformity to the stores housed in these buildings and to create a streetscape that would be unique to Esashi.
- Esashi Kinsatsumai is one of the most sought-after rice varieties in Japan.

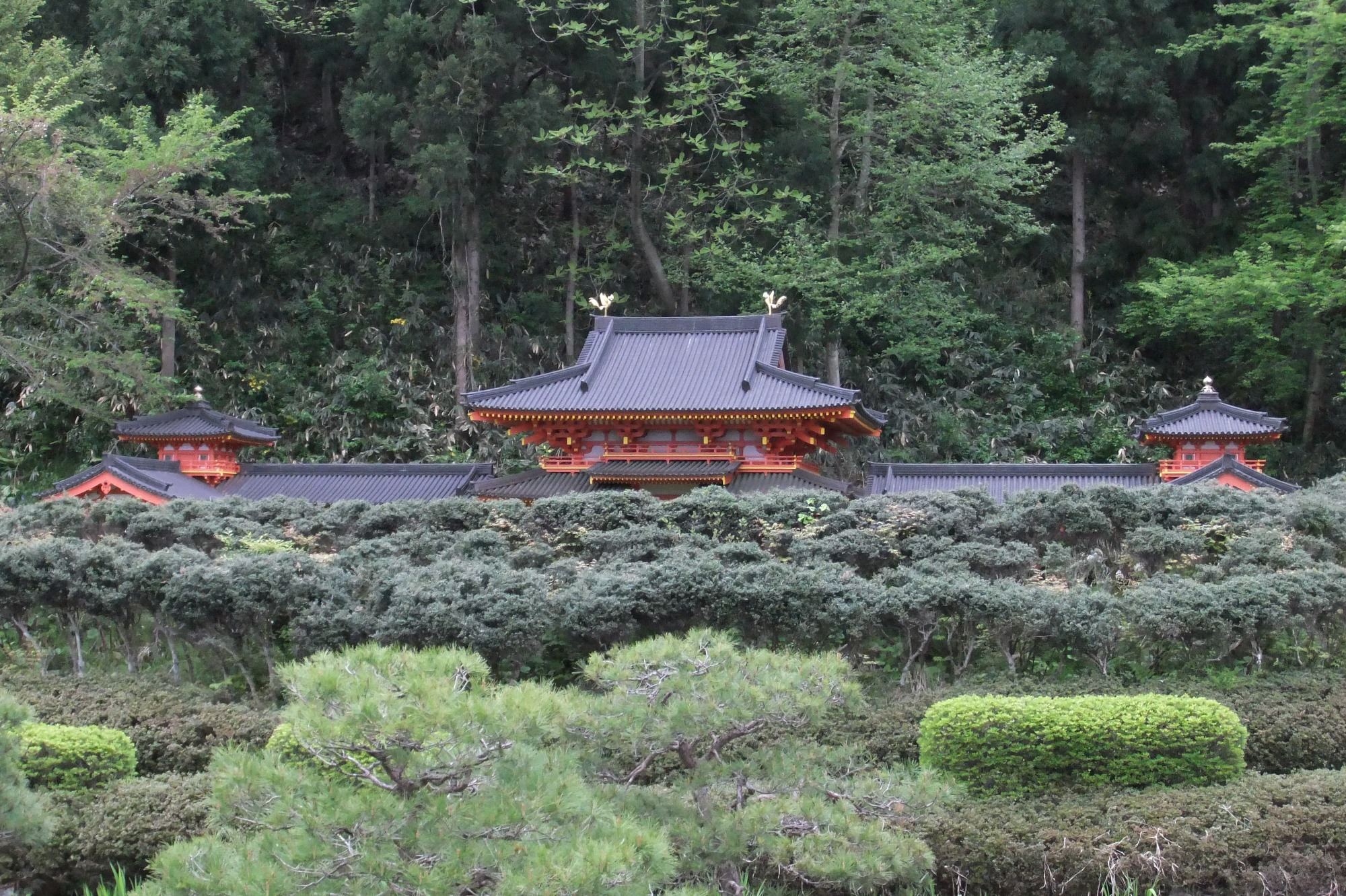
A model of the Muryōkō-in Temple at the Esashi-Fujiwara Heritage Park.

=== Former international relations ===
- Australia - City of Greater Shepparton (Victoria, Australia) - sister city since March 3, 1979
- Austria - Reutte/Breitenwang (Tyrol, Austria) - sister city since June 7, 1991

== Climate ==
Climate data for Esashi, Iwate (1991−2020 normals, extremes 1976−present)
Month	Jan	Feb	Mar	Apr	May	Jun	Jul	Aug	Sep	Oct	Nov	Dec	Year
Record high °C (°F)	13.2 (55.8)	16.9 (62.4)	23.0 (73.4)	29.3 (84.7)	34.6 (94.3)	34.8 (94.6)	37.3 (99.1)	37.3 (99.1)	36.1 (97.0)	29.4 (84.9)	23.9 (75.0)	20.0 (68.0)	37.3 (99.1)
Mean daily maximum °C (°F)	2.5 (36.5)	3.8 (38.8)	8.5 (47.3)	15.3 (59.5)	21.0 (69.8)	24.6 (76.3)	27.6 (81.7)	29.0 (84.2)	25.1 (77.2)	18.9 (66.0)	11.9 (53.4)	5.1 (41.2)	16.1 (61.0)
Daily mean °C (°F)	−1.2 (29.8)	−0.4 (31.3)	3.3 (37.9)	9.2 (48.6)	15.1 (59.2)	19.3 (66.7)	22.8 (73.0)	23.9 (75.0)	19.8 (67.6)	13.3 (55.9)	6.7 (44.1)	1.3 (34.3)	11.1 (52.0)
Mean daily minimum °C (°F)	−5.2 (22.6)	−4.6 (23.7)	−1.4 (29.5)	3.4 (38.1)	9.8 (49.6)	15.0 (59.0)	19.2 (66.6)	20.1 (68.2)	15.6 (60.1)	8.4 (47.1)	2.0 (35.6)	−2.3 (27.9)	6.7 (44.0)
Record low °C (°F)	−18.6 (−1.5)	−18.9 (−2.0)	−15.6 (3.9)	−5.3 (22.5)	−0.3 (31.5)	5.8 (42.4)	8.9 (48.0)	10.8 (51.4)	3.9 (39.0)	−1.1 (30.0)	−8.4 (16.9)	−15.5 (4.1)	−18.9 (−2.0)
Average precipitation mm (inches)	57.3 (2.26)	43.6 (1.72)	71.4 (2.81)	77.2 (3.04)	98.0 (3.86)	109.7 (4.32)	168.9 (6.65)	155.6 (6.13)	149.7 (5.89)	115.3 (4.54)	72.2 (2.84)	73.4 (2.89)	1,194.1 (47.01)
Average precipitation days (≥ 1.0 mm)	13.2	11.1	10.7	9.5	10.5	9.7	13.0	11.3	11.5	10.7	11.7	13.8	136.7
Mean monthly sunshine hours	95.9	111.5	155.5	178.8	187.8	154.6	132.0	149.7	126.2	130.5	113.5	89.0	1,630
Source: JMA
