= Mizusawa, Iwate =

Mizusawa 水沢市
- Former municipality
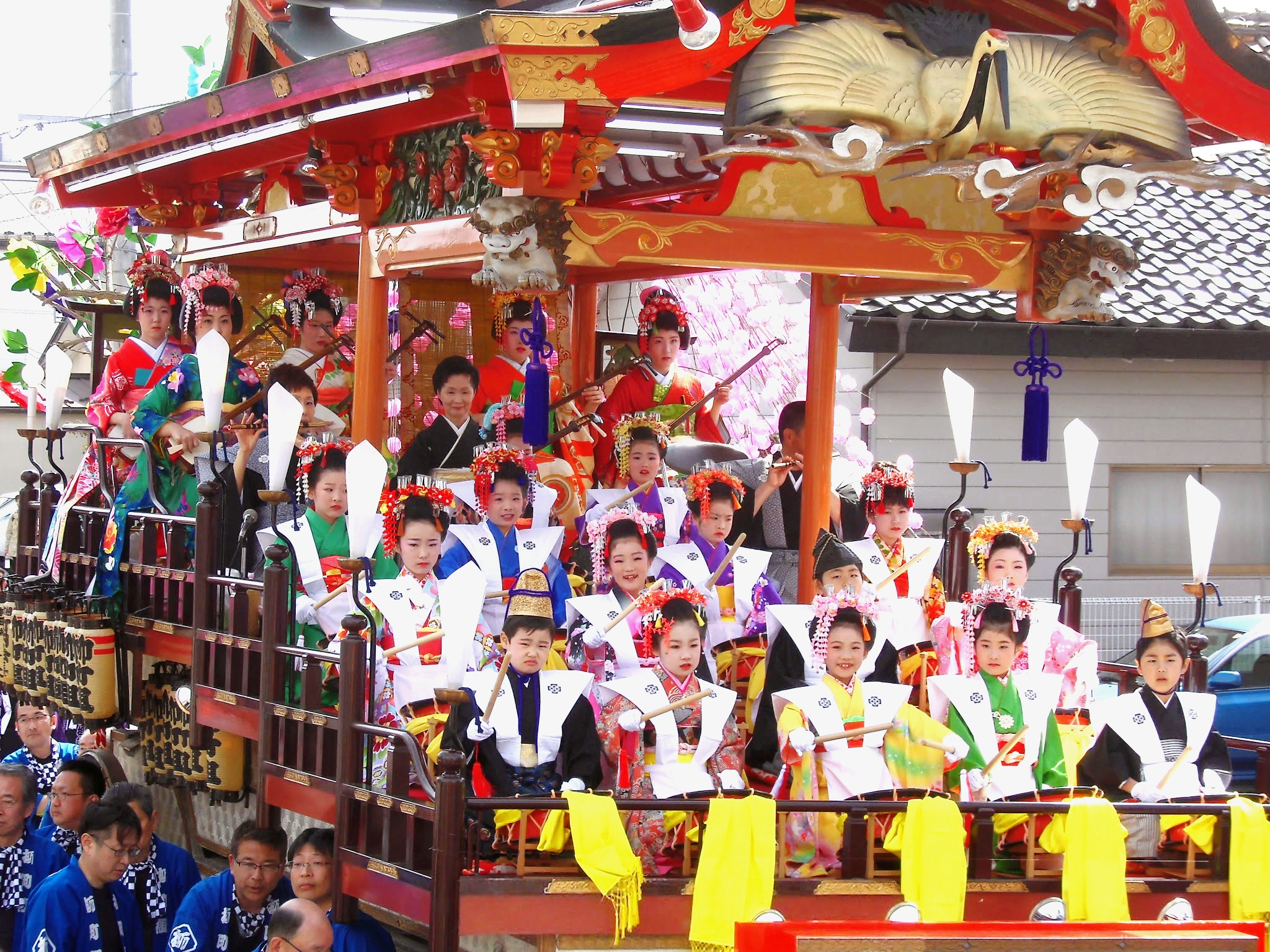
- Hidaka Fire Prevention Festival

- Flag Emblem

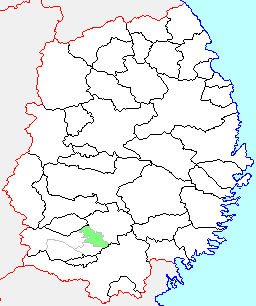
- Location of Mizusawa in Iwate Prefecture

- Location in Japan
- Coordinates: 39°08′37.7″N 141°08′20.3″E
- Country: Japan
- Region: Tōhoku
- Prefecture: Iwate Prefecture
- District: Isawa
- Merged: February 20, 2006 (now part of Ōshū)

Area
  - Total: 96.92 km^{2} (37.42 sq mi)

Population (September 1, 2005)
  - Total: 60,239
  - Density: 621.53/km^{2} (1,609.8/sq mi)
- Time zone: UTC+09:00 (JST)
- Symbols
- Bird: Pheezy
- Flower: Weeping sakura
- Tree: Maple

Mizusawa (水沢市, Mizusawa-shi) was a city located in Iwate Prefecture, Japan. In February 2006, it was merged with neighboring cities to form the city of Ōshū (Ōshū-shi (奥州市). At that time, Mizusawa had an estimated population of 60,239 and a population density of 621.53 persons per km^{2}. The total area was 96.92 km^{2} (37.42 sq mi). Mizusawa developed as a castle town along the Ōwu Highway during the Tokugawa period. The city was a commercial hub for agricultural (rice, apples, and dairy products,) as well as for traditional cast metalware produced in the Kitakami valley. The total land usage is 17.1% for rice fields, 4.4% for fields, and 3.9% for residential areas, and 3.9% for residential areas, and the proportion of farmland is high.

Mizusawa was home to one of the six International Latitude Observatories, where Hisashi Kimura was chief astronomer. It is now home to National Astronomical Observatory of Japan's Mizusawa VLBI Observatory, while the original observatory has been converted into a museum honoring Kimura.

== Municipal history ==
On April 1, 1889, the town of Mizusawa was created due to the establishment of the modern municipalities system (shichōson-sei).

On April 1, 1954, Mizusawa became a city when the town absorbed the neighboring villages of Anetai, Shinjo, Sakuragawa, Kuroishi and Haneda.

On February 20, 2006, Mizusawa, along with the city of Esashi, the towns of Isawa and Maesawa, and the village of Koromogawa (all from Isawa District), was merged to create the city of Ōshū, and no longer exists as an independent municipality.

== Notable people ==
- Shohei Ohtani – Former Nippon Professional Baseball (NPB) and current Major League Baseball (MLB) player
