= Maesawa Station =

Railway station in Ōshu, Iwate Prefecture, Japan

Maesawa Station 前沢駅
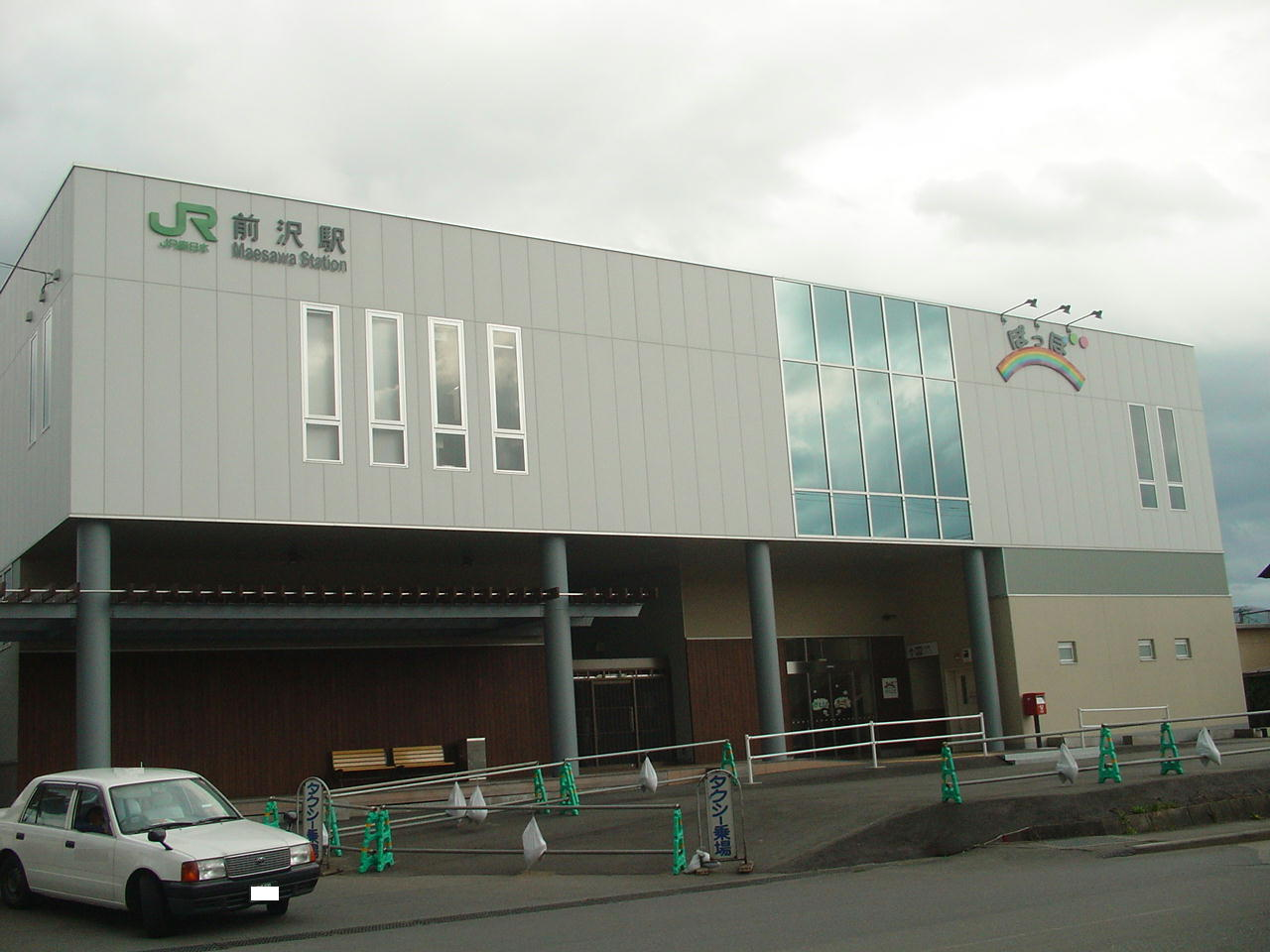
- Maesawa Station, July 2012

General information
- Location: Maesawa-ku Mikka-machi, Ōshū-shi, Iwate-ken 023-0000; Japan
- Coordinates: 39.0488°N 141.1264°E
- Operator: JR East
- Line: ■ Tōhoku Main Line
- Distance: 459.9 km from Tokyo
- Platforms: 1 side + 1 island platforms
- Tracks: 3

Other information
- Status: Staffed ("Midori no Madoguchi")
- Website: Official website

History
- Opened: 1 November 1890

Passengers
- FY2018: 507 daily

Services
Preceding station	JR East	Following station
Hiraizumi towards Kuroiso	Tōhoku Main Line Local	Rikuchū-Orii towards Morioka
Location
- Location within Iwate Prefecture Location within Japan

Maesawa Station (前沢駅, Maesawa-eki) is a railway station in the city of Ōshū, Iwate, Japan, operated by East Japan Railway Company (JR East).

== Lines ==
Maesawa Station is served by the Tōhoku Main Line, and is located 459.9 rail kilometers from the official starting point of the line at Tokyo Station.

== Station layout ==
The station has a single side platform and an island platform connected to the elevated station building by a footbridge. The station has a "Midori no Madoguchi" staffed ticket office.

=== Platforms ===
1	■ Tōhoku Main Line	for Kitakami and Morioka
2	■ Tōhoku Main Line	(passing loop)
3	■ Tōhoku Main Line	for Ichinoseki and Sendai

== History ==
Maesawa Station opened on 1 November 1890. It was absorbed into the JR East network upon the privatization of the Japanese National Railways (JNR) on 1 April 1987. A new station building was completed in 2005.

== Passenger statistics ==
In fiscal 2018, the station was used by an average of 507 passengers daily (boarding passengers only).

== Surrounding area ==
- Maesawa Post Office
- Maesawa High School

== See also ==
- List of railway stations in Japan
