= Koromogawa, Iwate =

Koromogawa 衣川村
- Former municipality
- Flag Emblem

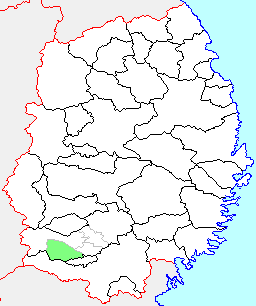
- Location of Koromogawa in Iwate Prefecture

- Location in Japan
- Coordinates: 39°03′N 141°07′E
- Country: Japan
- Region: Tōhoku
- Prefecture: Iwate Prefecture
- District: Isawa
- Merged: February 20, 2006 (now part of Ōshū)

Area
  - Total: 163.57 km^{2} (63.15 sq mi)

Population (September 1, 2005)
  - Total: 4,954
  - Density: 30.29/km^{2} (78.5/sq mi)
- Time zone: UTC+09:00 (JST)
- Symbols
- Bird: Green pheasant
- Flower: Gentiana scabra
- Tree: Cryptomeria

Koromogawa (衣川村, Koromogawa-mura) was a village located in Isawa District, Iwate Prefecture, Japan. It is currently part of the city of Ōshū.

The village of Koromogawa was created on April 1, 1889, with the establishment of the municipalities system. On February 20, 2006, Koromogawa, along with the cities of Esashi and Mizusawa, and the towns of Isawa and Maesawa (both from Isawa District), was merged to create the city of Ōshū, and no longer exists as an independent municipality.

As of February 2006, the village had an estimated population of 4,954 and a population density of 30.29 persons per km^{2}. The total area was 163.57 km^{2}.
