= Kanegasaki, Iwate =

Kanegasaki 金ケ崎町
- Town
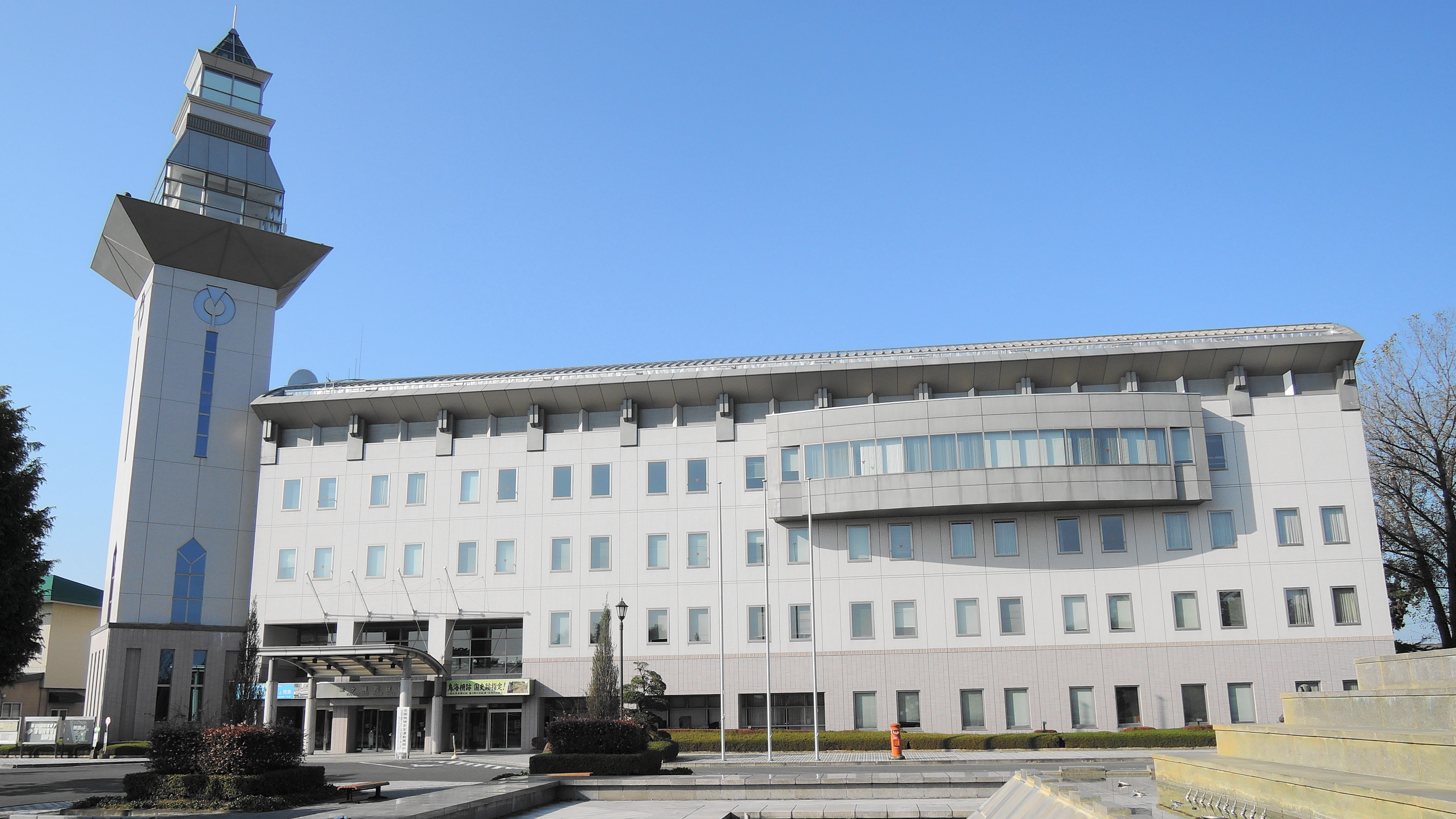
- Kanegasaki Town Hall

- Flag Seal

- Location of Kanegasaki in Iwate Prefecture

- Coordinates: 39°11′44.6″N 141°06′58.80″E
- Country: Japan
- Region: Tōhoku
- Prefecture: Iwate
- District: Isawa

Area
  - Total: 179.76 km^{2} (69.41 sq mi)

Population (April 30, 2020)
  - Total: 15,580
  - Density: 86.67/km^{2} (224.5/sq mi)
- Time zone: UTC+9 (Japan Standard Time)
- City symbols
  - Tree: Cryptomeria
  - Flower: Satsuki azalea
  - Bird: Copper pheasant
- Phone number: 0197-42-2111
- Address: 22-1 Nishine-Minami-chō, Kanegasaki-chō, Isawa-gun, Iwate-ken 029-4592
- Website: Official website

Dairy farm in western part of Kanegasaki

Kanegasaki (金ケ崎町, Kanegasaki-chō) is a town located in Iwate Prefecture, Japan. As of 30 April 2020, the town had an estimated population of 15,580, and a population density of 87 persons per km^{2} in 6,155 households. The total area of the town is 179.76 square kilometres (69.41 sq mi). In June 2001, the 34.8 hectare old centre of town was protected as an Important Preservation District by the national government for its traditional samurai residences.

== Geography ==
Kanegasaki is located in the Tōhoku region of northern Japan at the confluence of the Kitakami and Isawa rivers and is bordered to the north by Kitakami-shi, to the east and south by Ōshū-shi. In the mountains to the west, there is a large reservoir known as Sengaishi that is dammed and used for irrigating the rice paddies in the plain below.

Kanegasaki is characterized by a variety of geographical features, including mountains and wide expanses of rice paddies to the west and a small merchant district and neighboring residential areas to the east. On the border of Kanegasaki and Esashi two neighborhoods (Jōnai and Suwa-kōji) were once the location of the border between the Nambu and Date domains, and several examples of gardens and houses from the Edo period that were residences of samurai prior to the 1868 Meiji Restoration remain.

=== Neighboring municipalities ===
Iwate Prefecture

- Kitakami
- Ōshū

=== Climate ===
Kanegasaki has a humid subtropical climate (Köppen climate classification Cfa) bordering with warm summers and cold winters. The average annual temperature in Kanegasaki is 10.3 °C. The average annual rainfall is 1323 mm with September as the wettest month and January as the driest month. The temperatures are highest on average in August, at around 24.1 °C, and lowest in January, at around -2.7 °C.

== Demographics ==
Per Japanese census data, the population of Kanegasaki has remained relatively stable over the past 70 years.

Historical population
| Year | Pop. | ±% |
|---|---|---|
| 1920 | 9,164 | — |
| 1930 | 10,295 | +12.3% |
| 1940 | 11,276 | +9.5% |
| 1950 | 16,417 | +45.6% |
| 1960 | 16,958 | +3.3% |
| 1970 | 14,872 | −12.3% |
| 1980 | 14,973 | +0.7% |
| 1990 | 15,672 | +4.7% |
| 2000 | 16,383 | +4.5% |
| 2010 | 16,325 | −0.4% |
| 2020 | 15,535 | −4.8% |

== History ==
The area of present-day Kanegasaki was part of ancient Mutsu Province, and has been settled since at least the Jōmon period by the Emishi people. During the later portion of the Heian period, the area was ruled by the Northern Fujiwara. During the Sengoku period, the area was contested by various samurai clans before coming under the control of the Date clan of Sendai Domain during the Edo period, under the Tokugawa shogunate.

The village of Kanegasaki was founded on April 1, 1889, with the establishment of the modern municipalities system. It was raised to town status on September 1, 1925. On March 1, 1955, Kanegasaki absorbed the neighboring village of Nagaoka, also from Isawa District.

== Government ==
Kanegasaki has a mayor-council form of government with a directly elected mayor and a unicameral town council of 16 members. Kanegasaki, together with the city of Ōshū contributes five seats to the Iwate Prefectural legislature. In terms of national politics, the town is part of Iwate 3rd district of the lower house of the Diet of Japan.

== Economy ==
Kanegasaki has a relatively diverse economy that includes rice paddies typical of the region, but also extensive dairy farms in the western portion of the town and a large industrial park. The industrial park has several different manufacturing facilities, such as a Toyota plant that produces Lexus automobiles (Kantō Jidōsha) and a Fujitsu semiconductor facility.

== Education ==
Kanegasaki has five public elementary schools and one public junior high school operated by the town government and one public high school operated by the Iwate Prefectural Board of Education. In addition, the town is known for having developed a system of Life-Long Learning Centers situated throughout the town that provide educational and other opportunities for the local residents.

== Transportation ==
=== Railway ===
East Japan Railway Company (JR East) - Tōhoku Main Line

- Kanegasaki - Rokuhara

=== Highway ===
- National Route 4

== International relations ==
- Amherst, Massachusetts, United States (since August 1993)
- Changchun, People's Republic of China (since February 1989)
- Leinefelde-Worbis, Germany (since September 2002)

== Local attractions ==
- Nanbu-Date border mounds, Edo-period border markers between Morioka Domain and Sendai Domain, a National Historic Site
- Tonomi Palisade Site, ruins of a late Nara-period fortification, National Historic Monument

== Noted people from Kanegasaki ==
- Houko Kuwashima, voice actress
