= Ōshū, Iwate =

Ōshū 奥州市
- City
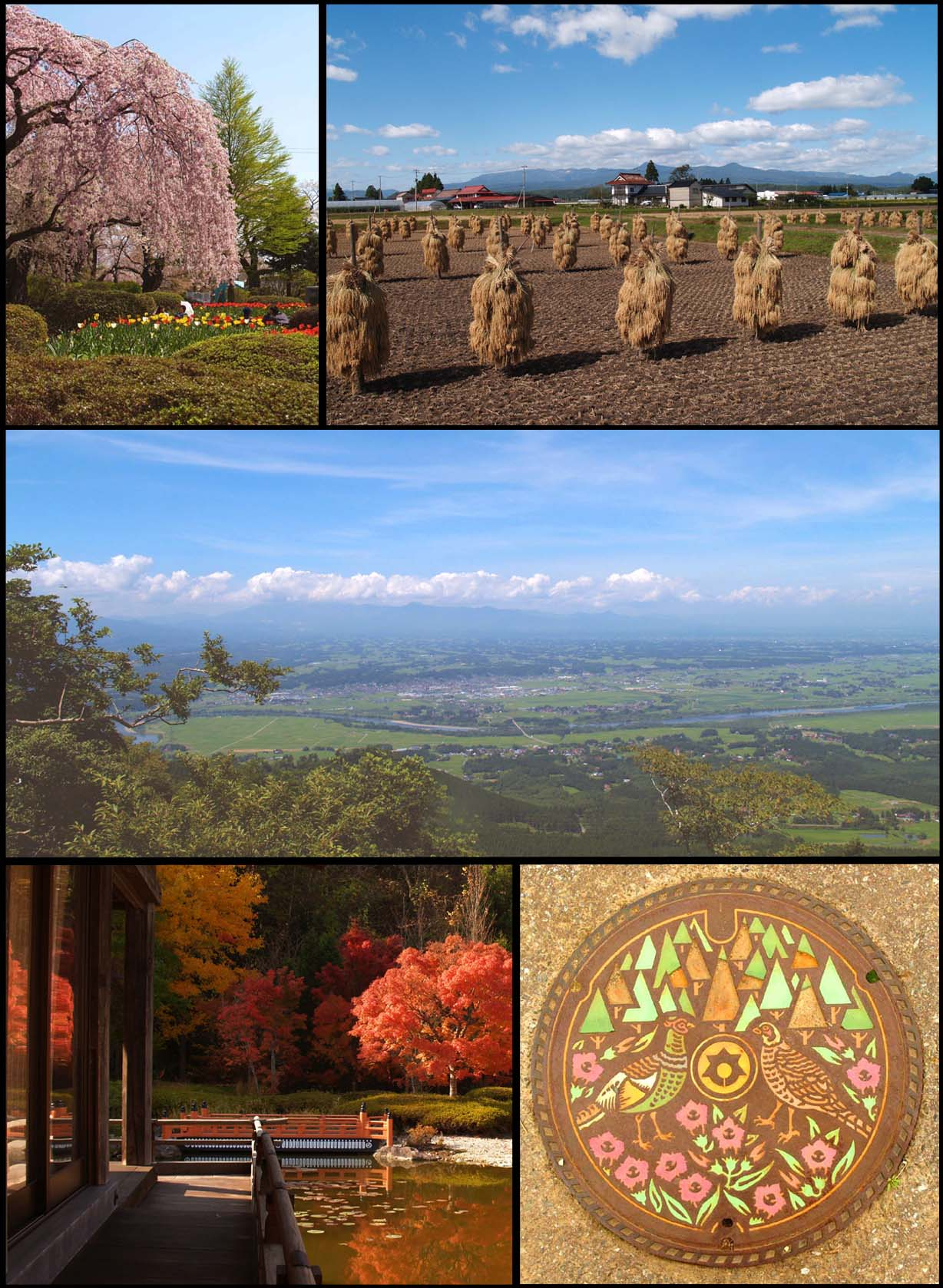
- From top left; Spring in Mizusawa Park, the Autumn rice harvest in Isawa, Maesawa and the Kitakami River in Summer from Mt. Otowa, Autumn foliage at Fujiwara no Sato in Esashi and a manhole cover in Koromogawa

- Flag Seal

- Location of Ōshū in Iwate Prefecture

- Coordinates: 39°8′40.1″N 141°08′20.9″E
- Country: Japan
- Region: Tōhoku
- Prefecture: Iwate

Government
  - Mayor: Hiroshi Gōkon (ja:郷右近浩) -from March 2026

Area
  - Total: 993.30 km^{2} (383.52 sq mi)

Population (April 30, 2020)
  - Total: 114,620
  - Density: 115.39/km^{2} (298.87/sq mi)
- Time zone: UTC+9 (Japan Standard Time)
- Phone number: 0197-24-2111
- Address: 1-1 Ōtemachi, Mizusawa-ku, Ōshū-shi, Iwate-ken 023-8501
- Climate: Cfa/Dfa
- Website: Official website
- Symbols
- Bird: Green pheasant
- Flower: Sakura
- Tree: Maple

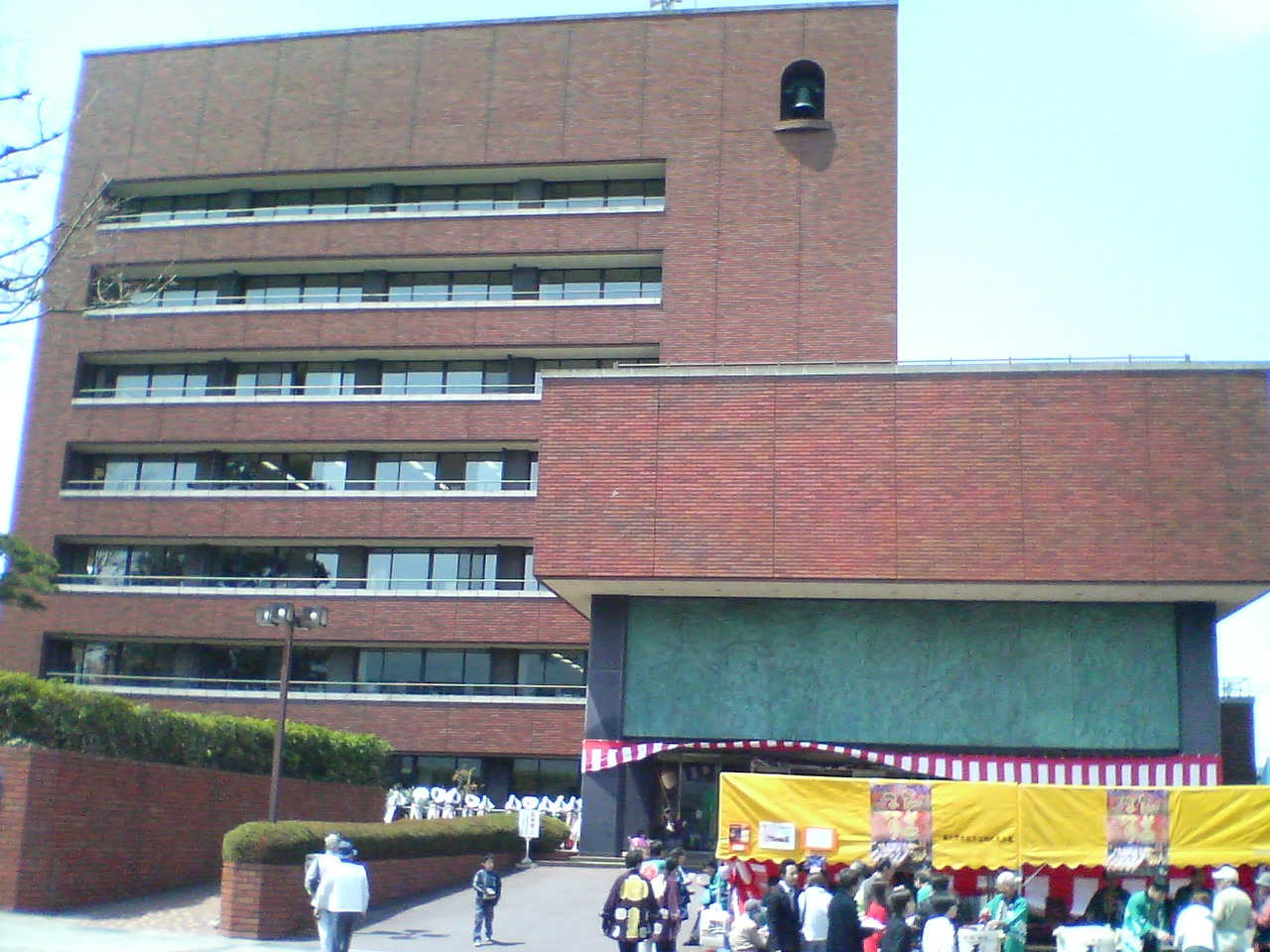
Ōshū City Hall

Ōshū (奥州市, Ōshū-shi; Japanese pronunciation: [ó̞ò̞.ɕɨ̀ɨ̀, ò̞ó̞.ɕɨ́ɨ̀.ɕì, ó̞ó̞.ɕɨ́ɨ̀-]) is a city located in Iwate Prefecture, Japan. As of 30 April 2020, the city had an estimated population of 114,620 and a population density of 120 persons per km^{2} in 45,728 households. The total area of the city is 993.30 square kilometres (383.52 sq mi). Ōshū is famous for its Maesawa Beef, numerous festivals, historic temples and shrines and Fujiwara no Sato, a theme park and movie lot based on the exploits of the Northern Fujiwaras in the 12th century. Many famous people claim Ōshū as their home, including Los Angeles Dodgers baseball player Shohei Ohtani and Ichiro Ozawa, the long-time leader of the Democratic Party of Japan.

== Geography ==
Ōshū is located in the south-central portion of Iwate Prefecture, bordered by the Akita Prefecture to the west. At 993.35 square kilometers, Ōshū is the second largest municipality in Iwate Prefecture in terms of land area. The city lies in a fertile plain straddling the Kitakami River and rises to the Ōu Mountains in the west and the Kitakami Mountains to the east. The city's highest point is Mt. Yakeishi-dake at 1,548 meters in the Ōu Mountains. The northern boundary is marked by the Isawa River while the Koromogawa River marks the southern border. Ishibuchi Dam creates a reservoir on the upper reaches of the Isawa River near Mt. Yakeishi-dake.

=== Neighboring municipalities ===
Akita Prefecture

- Higashinaruse

Iwate Prefecture

- Hanamaki
- Hiraizumi
- Ichinoseki
- Kanegasaki
- Kitakami
- Nishiwaga
- Sumita
- Tōno

== Climate ==
Ōshū has a humid subtropical climate (Köppen climate classification Cfa) or humid continental climate (Köppen climate classification Dfa) depending on the isotherm used with warm summers and cold winters. The average annual temperature in Ōshū is 10.4 °C. The average annual rainfall is 1278 mm with September as the wettest month and January as the driest month. The temperatures are highest on average in August, at around 24.2 °C, and lowest in January, at around -2.5 °C.

Climate data for Esashi, Ōshū (elevation 42 m, 1991–2020 normals, extremes 1976–present)
Month	Jan	Feb	Mar	Apr	May	Jun	Jul	Aug	Sep	Oct	Nov	Dec	Year
Record high °C (°F)	13.2 (55.8)	18.9 (66.0)	23.0 (73.4)	29.3 (84.7)	34.6 (94.3)	34.9 (94.8)	38.2 (100.8)	37.3 (99.1)	36.1 (97.0)	29.7 (85.5)	23.9 (75.0)	20.0 (68.0)	38.2 (100.8)
Mean daily maximum °C (°F)	2.5 (36.5)	3.8 (38.8)	8.5 (47.3)	15.3 (59.5)	21.0 (69.8)	24.6 (76.3)	27.6 (81.7)	29.0 (84.2)	25.1 (77.2)	18.9 (66.0)	11.9 (53.4)	5.1 (41.2)	16.2 (61.2)
Daily mean °C (°F)	−1.2 (29.8)	−0.4 (31.3)	3.3 (37.9)	9.2 (48.6)	15.1 (59.2)	19.3 (66.7)	22.8 (73.0)	23.9 (75.0)	19.8 (67.6)	13.3 (55.9)	6.7 (44.1)	1.3 (34.3)	11.1 (52.0)
Mean daily minimum °C (°F)	−5.2 (22.6)	−4.6 (23.7)	−1.4 (29.5)	3.4 (38.1)	9.8 (49.6)	15.0 (59.0)	19.2 (66.6)	20.1 (68.2)	15.6 (60.1)	8.4 (47.1)	2.0 (35.6)	−2.3 (27.9)	6.7 (44.1)
Record low °C (°F)	−18.6 (−1.5)	−18.9 (−2.0)	−15.6 (3.9)	−5.3 (22.5)	−0.3 (31.5)	5.8 (42.4)	8.9 (48.0)	10.8 (51.4)	3.9 (39.0)	−1.1 (30.0)	−8.4 (16.9)	−15.5 (4.1)	−18.9 (−2.0)
Average precipitation mm (inches)	57.3 (2.26)	43.6 (1.72)	71.4 (2.81)	77.2 (3.04)	98.0 (3.86)	109.7 (4.32)	168.9 (6.65)	155.6 (6.13)	149.7 (5.89)	115.3 (4.54)	72.2 (2.84)	73.4 (2.89)	1,194.1 (47.01)
Average precipitation days (≥ 1.0 mm)	13.2	11.1	10.7	9.5	10.5	9.7	13.0	11.3	11.5	10.7	11.7	13.8	136.9
Mean monthly sunshine hours	95.9	111.5	155.5	178.8	187.8	154.6	132.0	149.7	126.2	130.5	113.5	89.0	1,630
Source: Japan Meteorological Agency (1991–2020 normals, extremes 1976–present)

Climate data for Wakayanagi, Ōshū (elevation 97 m, 1991–2020 normals, extremes 1976–present)
Month	Jan	Feb	Mar	Apr	May	Jun	Jul	Aug	Sep	Oct	Nov	Dec	Year
Record high °C (°F)	14.1 (57.4)	17.9 (64.2)	21.8 (71.2)	30.6 (87.1)	33.6 (92.5)	33.4 (92.1)	36.3 (97.3)	36.9 (98.4)	34.7 (94.5)	28.8 (83.8)	22.7 (72.9)	19.3 (66.7)	36.9 (98.4)
Mean daily maximum °C (°F)	2.1 (35.8)	3.3 (37.9)	8.0 (46.4)	14.9 (58.8)	20.5 (68.9)	23.9 (75.0)	27.0 (80.6)	28.5 (83.3)	24.5 (76.1)	18.4 (65.1)	11.5 (52.7)	4.6 (40.3)	15.6 (60.1)
Daily mean °C (°F)	−1.4 (29.5)	−0.7 (30.7)	3.0 (37.4)	8.9 (48.0)	14.8 (58.6)	18.8 (65.8)	22.3 (72.1)	23.4 (74.1)	19.5 (67.1)	13.1 (55.6)	6.6 (43.9)	1.0 (33.8)	10.8 (51.4)
Mean daily minimum °C (°F)	−5.1 (22.8)	−4.7 (23.5)	−1.5 (29.3)	3.2 (37.8)	9.7 (49.5)	14.7 (58.5)	18.8 (65.8)	19.8 (67.6)	15.5 (59.9)	8.5 (47.3)	2.1 (35.8)	−2.4 (27.7)	6.5 (43.8)
Record low °C (°F)	−19.9 (−3.8)	−15.9 (3.4)	−13.2 (8.2)	−6.5 (20.3)	0.9 (33.6)	6.3 (43.3)	9.0 (48.2)	11.4 (52.5)	4.4 (39.9)	−0.9 (30.4)	−8.2 (17.2)	−12.5 (9.5)	−19.9 (−3.8)
Average precipitation mm (inches)	65.1 (2.56)	50.4 (1.98)	83.6 (3.29)	87.6 (3.45)	109.4 (4.31)	136.6 (5.38)	186.3 (7.33)	154.4 (6.08)	166.9 (6.57)	124.6 (4.91)	80.7 (3.18)	80.8 (3.18)	1,325.2 (52.17)
Average precipitation days (≥ 1.0 mm)	14.0	11.7	12.0	10.3	10.5	10.6	13.1	11.9	11.6	10.8	11.6	14.6	142.2
Mean monthly sunshine hours	74.6	90.8	141.5	171.0	179.3	140.2	119.3	133.0	115.8	127.8	109.7	76.2	1,485.2
Source: Japan Meteorological Agency (1991–2020 normals, extremes 1976–present)

== Demographics ==
Per Japanese census data, the population of Ōshū peaked at around the year 2000, and has been in decline since.

Historical population
Year	Pop.	±%
1920	93,876	—
1930	104,752	+11.6%
1940	110,980	+5.9%
1950	137,556	+23.9%
1960	138,272	+0.5%
1970	126,304	−8.7%
1980	130,318	+3.2%
1990	132,116	+1.4%
2000	133,056	+0.7%
2010	124,746	−6.2%
2020	112,937	−9.5%

== History ==
The area of present-day Ōshū was part of ancient Mutsu Province, and has been settled since at least the Japanese Paleolithic period. Isawa is especially rich in Kofun Period remains from the 5th century. By the Nara period, Japanese hunters, trappers, settlers and itinerant missionaries were visiting and settling in this area, and coming into contact with the native Emishi people. In 729, Kokuseki-ji temple claims to have been established by the Buddhist priest Gyōki in a mountainous area to the east of the Kitakami River in what is now Mizusawa. In 776, two separate attacks were launched by the imperial dynasty against the Emishi with little success. In June 787 Emishi cavalry led by Aterui and More surprised and routed a larger force of Japanese infantry in the Battle of Subuse (located in what is now part of Mizusawa). Despite these successes the Emishi could not hold out against the Japanese and in 802 Aterui and More surrendered and were beheaded. That same year Sakanoue no Tamuramaro, established Isawa Castle. Despite the victory the Japanese found if difficult to rule the territory directly. Six semi-autonomous districts were established along the Kitakami River. Eventually these came under the control of a powerful Emishi clan from Appi, the Abe clan. Early in the 11th century Abe no Yoritoki refused to pay taxes to the central government, led raiding parties south of the Koromo River, and generally ruled as an independent monarch. This led to the Zenkunen War (前九年合戦) or Early Nine-Years War (1050 - 1062), in which Minamoto no Yoriyoshi reinforced by Kiyohara no Takenori from Dewa Province defeated the Abe clan. The area later came under the rule of the Kiyohara clan. Corrupt administration by the Kiyohara led to the Gosannen War (後三年合戦) or Latter Three Years' War (1083 - 1087) in which Minamoto no Yoshiie subdued the Kiyohara.

Fujiwara no Kiyohira, the founder of the Ōshū Fujiwara dynasty, was born in Fort Toyota which is now in the Iwayado area of Esashi. Around 1100, he relocated to Hiraizumi where he and his descendants ruled for nearly a hundred years.

In 1348, a Zen Buddhist priest named Mutei Ryōshō founded the temple of Shōbō-ji near Kokuseki-ji temple in Mizusawa. It is the third head temple of the Sōtō sect of Zen Buddhism and boasts the largest thatched roof in Japan.

During the Sengoku period, the area came under control of the powerful Date clan. During this period, Italian Jesuit missionaries regarded it as a kingdom. which they called "Voxu". Following the Battle of Sekigahara, the Tokugawa shogunate confirmed the area was part of Sendai Domain under Date Masamune. One of his retainers was a certain Juan Gotō who commanded Date Masamune's gun regiment at Osaka in 1614 and 1615. He was also a Kirishitan and established a church in the Fukuwara area of Mizusawa. After Christianity was outlawed in 1623 he went into hiding to escape capture. Foreign missionaries continued to visit the area in secret until December 1623 when the Jesuit Padre Diogo de Carvalho from Portugal was captured on the upper reaches of the Isawa River, sent to Sendai and forced to stand in the frozen Hirose River until he died in the early hours of what was then New Year's Day, namely February 19, 1624. There is a memorial to Juan Gotō in the Fukuwara area and many crypto-Christian remains can still be seen in that neighborhood.

Following the Meiji restoration, the area was assigned to Iwate Prefecture rather than Miyagi Prefecture as part of the governments efforts to break up former Sendai Domain, partly due to its role in opposing the Meiji government during the Boshin War. The town of Mizusawa was created within Isawa District on April 1, 1889, with the establishment of the modern municipalities system. It was raised to city status on April 1, 1954. The village of Esashi was likewise created on April 1, 1889, raised to town status on February 10, 1955, and to city status on November 3, 1958.

The city of Ōshū was established on February 20, 2006, from the merger of the cities Esashi and Mizusawa with the towns of Isawa and Maesawa, and the village of Koromogawa.

== Government ==
Ōshū has a mayor-council form of government with a directly elected mayor and a unicameral city legislature of 28 members. Ōshū, together with the city of Kanegasaki contributes five seats to the Iwate Prefectural legislature. In terms of national politics, the city is part of Iwate 3rd district of the lower house of the Diet of Japan.

== Education ==
- Graduate University for Advanced Studies – Iwate campus
- Iwate University – Ōshū campus
- Ōshū has 27 public elementary schools and 12 public middle schools operated by the city government and eight public high schools operated by the Iwate Prefectural Board of Education. The prefecture also operates one special education school.

== Transportation ==
=== Railway ===
East Japan Railway Company (JR East) - Tōhoku Shinkansen

- Mizusawa-Esashi

East Japan Railway Company (JR East) - Tōhoku Main Line

- Maesawa - Rikuchū-Orii - Mizusawa

=== Highway ===
- Tōhoku Expressway – Maesawa SA, Mizusawa IC
- National Route 4
- National Route 107
- National Route 343
- National Route 397
- National Route 456

== Sister cities ==
- Breitenwang, Tirol, Austria, since June 2011
- Greater Shepparton, Victoria, Australia, since March 1979
- Reutte, Tirol, Austria, since June 2011

== Local attractions ==
- Isawa Castle, ruins of a Heian-period fortification, a National Historic Site
- The sound of the Nambu Fūrin (wind chimes) at Mizusawa Station in Ōshū is designated as one of the 100 Soundscapes of Japan by the Ministry of the Environment
- Ōsuzukami Site, Jōmon period ruins, a National Historic Site
- Shirotoridate ruins, Heian period settlement ruins, a National Historic Site
- Tsunozuka Kofun, the northernmost keyhole-shaped kofun in Japan, a National Historic Site

== Notable people ==
- Shiina Etsusaburo, diplomat, foreign minister
- Maedagawa Katsu, sumo wrestler
- Keiji Kokuta, politician
- Akiko Kuji, announcer, actress, and model
- Saito Makoto, IJN admiral, politician and prime minister of Japan
- Eiichi Ohtaki, musician, singer-songwriter
- Shohei Ohtani, professional baseball player
- Gotō Shinpei, politician
- Oikawa Teruhisa, sumo wrestler
- Tatsuya Yoshida, musician
