= Yamanome Station =

Railway station in Ichinoseki, Iwate Prefecture, Japan

Yamanome Station 山ノ目駅
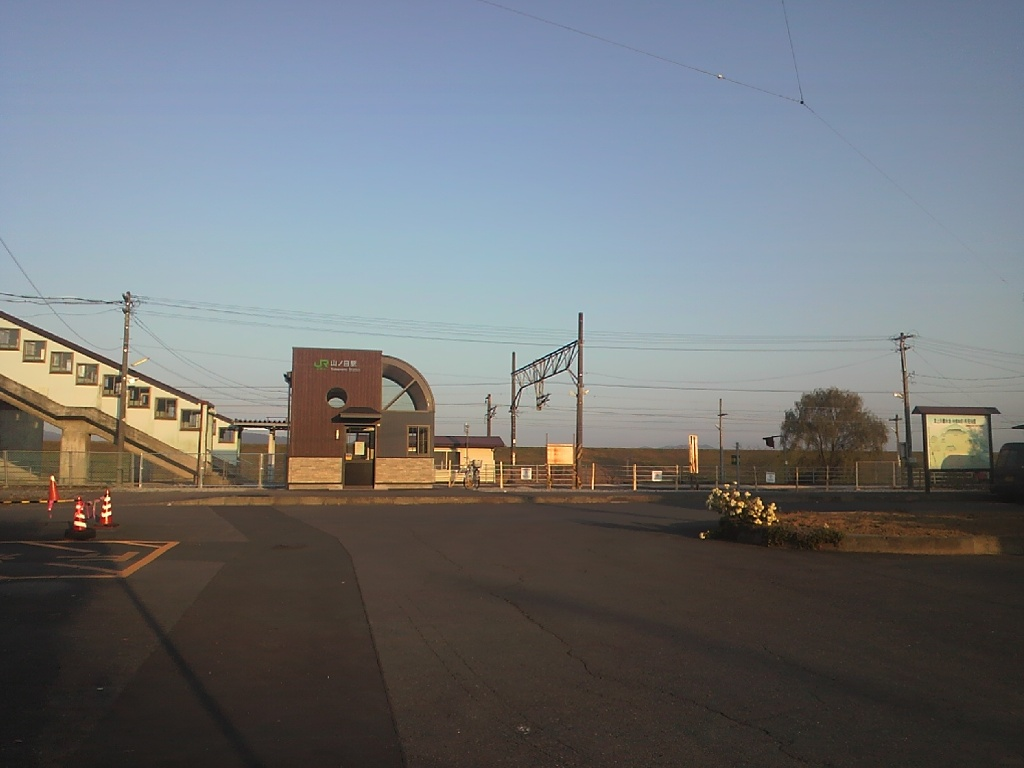
- Yamanome Station, November 2011

General information
- Location: 3-4-15 Yamanome-cho, Ichinoseki-shi, Iwate-ken 021-0011; Japan
- Coordinates: 38.9514°N 141.1321°E
- Operator: JR East
- Line: ■ Tōhoku Main Line
- Distance: 448.0 km from Tokyo
- Platforms: 2 side platforms
- Tracks: 2

Construction
- Structure type: At grade

Other information
- Status: Unstaffed
- Website: Official website

History
- Opened: 8 April 1928

Services
Preceding station	JR East	Following station
Ichinoseki towards Kuroiso	Tōhoku Main Line Local	Hiraizumi towards Morioka
Location
- Location within Iwate Prefecture Location within Japan

Yamanome Station (山ノ目駅, Yamanome-eki) is a railway station in the city of Ichinoseki, Japan, operated by East Japan Railway Company (JR East).

== Lines ==
Yamanome Station is served by the Tōhoku Main Line, and is located 448.0 rail kilometers from the terminus of the line at Tokyo Station.

== Station layout ==
The station has two opposed side platforms connected to the station building by a footbridge. The station is unattended.

=== Platforms ===
1	■ Tōhoku Main Line	for Kitakami and Morioka
2	■ Tōhoku Main Line	for Ichinoseki

== History ==
Yamanome Station opened on 8 April 1928. The station was absorbed into the JR East network upon the privatization of the Japanese National Railways (JNR) on 1 April 1987. A new station building was completed in May 2011.

== Surrounding area ==
- Yamanome-machi Post Office

== See also ==
- List of railway stations in Japan
