= Oikawa Teruhisa =

Japanese sumo wrestler

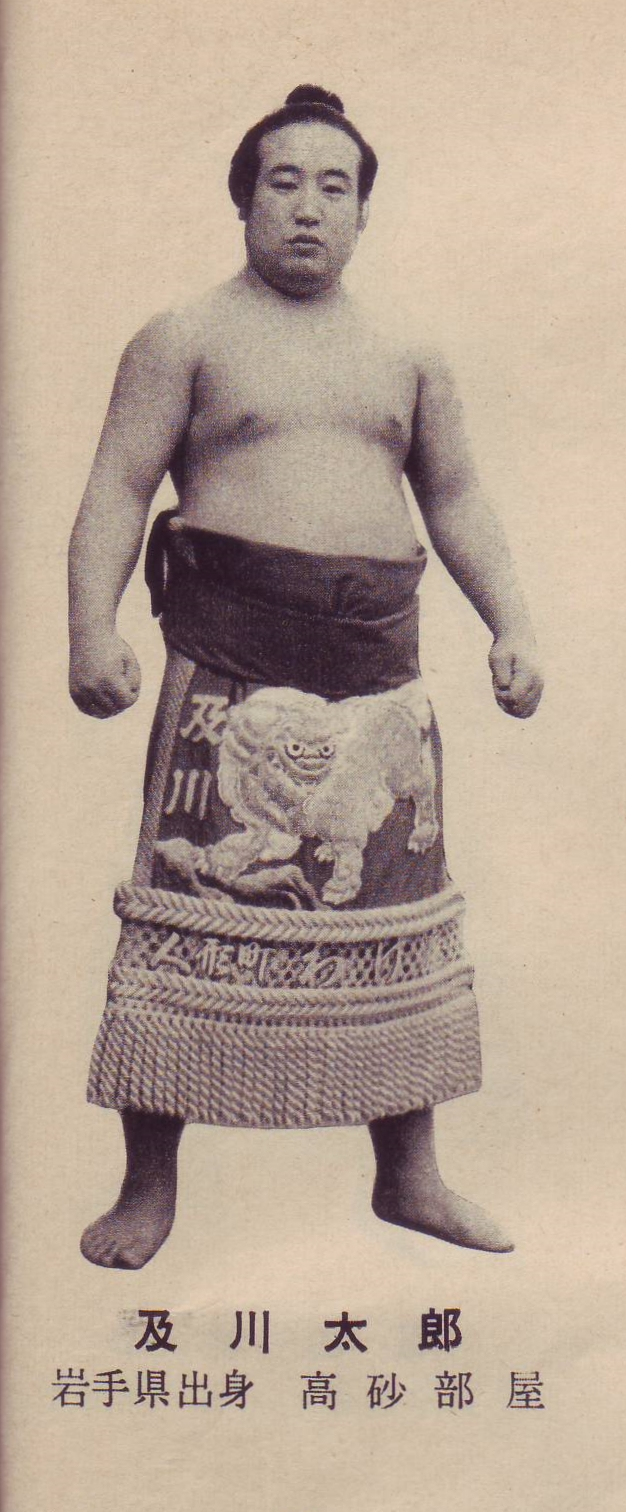

Personal information
- Native name: 及川 煌久
- Born: Kotsugu Oikawa; 11 January 1936 (age 90) Maesawa, Iwate, Japan
- Height: 1.76 m (5 ft 9 1/2 in)
- Weight: 120 kg (260 lb)

Sport
- Sport: Sumo
- Retired: May, 1962
- Heya: Oneo → Takasago
- Record: 300-307-19
- Debut: January, 1952
- Highest rank: Maegashira 10 (September, 1960)
- Championships: 2 (Jūryō)
- Updated on Sep. 2012

Oikawa Teruhisa (born 11 January 1936 as Kotsugu Oikawa) is a former sumo wrestler from Maesawa, Iwate, Japan. He made his professional debut in January 1952 and reached the top division in September 1957. His highest rank was maegashira 10. He retired from active competition in May 1962.

== Pre-modern career record ==
- In 1953 the New Year tournament was begun and the Spring tournament began to be held in Osaka.

Oikawa Teruhisa
-	Spring Haru basho, Tokyo	Summer Natsu basho, Tokyo	Autumn Aki basho, Tokyo
1952	Shinjo; 1–2	West Jonidan #30; 1–7	East Jonidan #30; 3–5
Record given as wins–losses–absences Top division champion Top division runner-up Retired Lower divisions Non-participation Sanshō key: F=Fighting spirit; O=Outstanding performance; T=Technique Also shown: ★=Kinboshi; P=Playoff(s); Divisions: Makuuchi — Jūryō — Makushita — Sandanme — Jonidan — Jonokuchi Makuuchi ranks: Yokozuna — Ōzeki — Sekiwake — Komusubi — Maegashira

-	New Year Hatsu basho, Tokyo	Spring Haru basho, Osaka	Summer Natsu basho, Tokyo	Autumn Aki basho, Tokyo
1953	West Jonidan #22; 5–3	East Sandanme #55; 3–5	East Sandanme #56; 3–5	East Sandanme #59; 5–3
1954	East Sandanme #43; 5–3	East Sandanme #26; 7–1	East Sandanme #4; 4–4	West Sandanme #1; 4–4
1955	East Makushita #47; 4–4	West Makushita #43; 4–4	East Makushita #41; 6–2	West Makushita #24; 5–3
1956	East Makushita #15; 5–3	East Makushita #11; 6–2	East Makushita #1; 5–3	West Jūryō #22; 8–7
Record given as wins–losses–absences Top division champion Top division runner-up Retired Lower divisions Non-participation Sanshō key: F=Fighting spirit; O=Outstanding performance; T=Technique Also shown: ★=Kinboshi; P=Playoff(s); Divisions: Makuuchi — Jūryō — Makushita — Sandanme — Jonidan — Jonokuchi Makuuchi ranks: Yokozuna — Ōzeki — Sekiwake — Komusubi — Maegashira

== Modern career record ==
- Since the addition of the Kyushu tournament in 1957 and the Nagoya tournament in 1958, the yearly schedule has remained unchanged.

Year	January Hatsu basho, Tokyo	March Haru basho, Osaka	May Natsu basho, Tokyo	July Nagoya basho, Nagoya	September Aki basho, Tokyo	November Kyūshū basho, Fukuoka
1957	East Jūryō #15; 13–2; Champion	East Jūryō #2; 7–8	West Jūryō #3; 13–2; Champion	Not held	East Maegashira #16; 8–7	West Maegashira #13; 7–8
1958	West Maegashira #14; 7–8	East Maegashira #15; 7–8	East Maegashira #15; 5–10	West Maegashira #19; 8–7	East Maegashira #17; 8–7	West Maegashira #16; 7–8
1959	East Maegashira #17; 7–8	East Maegashira #18; 9–6	West Maegashira #13; 5–6–4	West Maegashira #16; 8–7	West Maegashira #13; 7–8	West Maegashira #12; 8–7
1960	East Maegashira #11; 7–8	West Maegashira #11; 7–8	East Maegashira #12; 6–9	East Maegashira #15; 8–7	East Maegashira #10; 6–9	West Maegashira #14; 8–7
1961	East Maegashira #11; 4–11	East Jūryō #2; 4–11	East Jūryō #9; 5–10	East Jūryō #16; 7–8	East Jūryō #17; 8–7	East Jūryō #13; 7–8
1962	East Jūryō #14; 5–10	West Jūryō #18; 0–5–10	West Makushita #14; Retired; 0–2–5	x	x	x
Record given as wins–losses–absences Top division champion Top division runner-up Retired Lower divisions Non-participation Sanshō key: F=Fighting spirit; O=Outstanding performance; T=Technique Also shown: ★=Kinboshi; P=Playoff(s); Divisions: Makuuchi — Jūryō — Makushita — Sandanme — Jonidan — Jonokuchi Makuuchi ranks: Yokozuna — Ōzeki — Sekiwake — Komusubi — Maegashira

== See also ==
- Glossary of sumo terms
- List of past sumo wrestlers
- List of sumo tournament second division champions
