= Takashi Fujiwara =

Japanese politician (born 1983)

- 藤原 崇
- Official portrait, 2026

Member of the House of Representatives
- Incumbent
- Assumed office 8 February 2026
- Preceded by: Ichirō Ozawa
- Constituency: Iwate 3rd
- In office 16 December 2012 – 9 October 2024
- Preceded by: Multi-member district
- Succeeded by: Ichirō Ozawa
- Constituency: Tohoku PR (2012–2021); Iwate 3rd (2021–2024)

Personal details
- Born: 2 August 1983 (age 43) Nishiwaga, Iwate, Japan
- Party: Liberal Democratic
- Education: Shizuoka University; Meiji Gakuin University

Takashi Fujiwara (藤原崇, Fujiwara Takashi; born 2 August 1983) is a Japanese politician of the Liberal Democratic Party. From 2012 to 2024, he was a member of the House of Representatives. From 2023 to 2024, he served as Director of the LDP's Youth Division.
