= Isawa, Iwate =

Isawa 胆沢町
- Former municipality
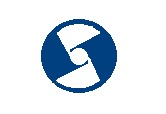
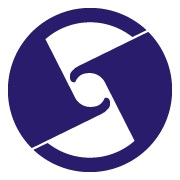
- Flag Emblem

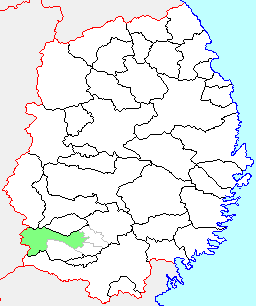
- Location of Isawa in Iwate Prefecture

- Location in Japan
- Coordinates: 39°06′N 141°04′E
- Country: Japan
- Region: Tōhoku
- Prefecture: Iwate Prefecture
- District: Isawa
- Merged: February 20, 2006 (now part of Ōshū)

Area
  - Total: 298.02 km^{2} (115.07 sq mi)

Population (September 1, 2005)
  - Total: 17,297
  - Density: 58.04/km^{2} (150.3/sq mi)
- Time zone: UTC+09:00 (JST)
- Symbols
- Bird: Copper pheasant
- Flower: Lilium auratum
- Tree: Camellia

Isawa (胆沢町, Isawa-chō) was a town located in Isawa District, Iwate Prefecture, Japan. It is currently part of the city of Ōshū. Isawa is well known for its capsicum (green pepper).

The name of the area is derived from the ancient Isawa tribe of Emishi who had put up fierce resistance to the Yamato court and its imperial aspirations. Isawa village proper was created on April 1, 1955 through the merger of the villages of Oyama, Natsuta and Wakayanagi. It was raised to town status on April 1, 1967. On February 20, 2006, Isawa, was merged with the cities of Esashi and Mizusawa, the town of Maesawa, and the village of Koromogawa (both from Isawa District), was merged to create the city of Ōshū, and no longer exists as an independent municipality.

As of February 2006, the town had an estimated population of 17,297 and a population density of 58.04 persons per km^{2}. The total area was 298.02 km^{2}.
