= Maesawa, Iwate =

Maesawa 前沢町
- Former municipality
- Flag Emblem

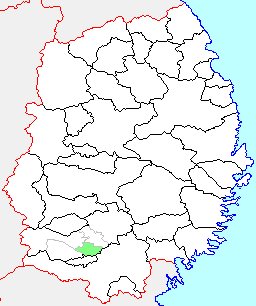
- Location of Maesawa in Iwate Prefecture

- Location in Japan
- Coordinates: 39°03′N 141°07′E
- Country: Japan
- Region: Tōhoku
- Prefecture: Iwate Prefecture
- District: Isawa
- Merged: February 20, 2006 (now part of Ōshū)

Area
  - Total: 72.34 km^{2} (27.93 sq mi)

Population (September 1, 2005)
  - Total: 15,111
  - Density: 208.89/km^{2} (541.0/sq mi)
- Time zone: UTC+09:00 (JST)
- Symbols
- Bird: Green pheasant
- Flower: Azalea
- Tree: Sakura

Maesawa (前沢町, Maesawa-chō) was a town located in Isawa District, Iwate Prefecture, Japan. It is currently part of the city of Ōshū. Maesawa is well known for its “Maesawa beef”.

Maesawa town was created on April 1, 1889, with the establishment of the municipalities system. On April 1, 1955, Maesawa annexed the neighboring villages of Kojo, Shirayama, and a portion of the village of Seibo. On February 20, 2006, Maesawa was merged with the cities of Esashi and Mizusawa, the town of Isawa, and the village of Koromogawa (both from Isawa District), was merged to create the city of Ōshū, and no longer exists as an independent municipality.

As of February 2006, the town had an estimated population of 15,111 and a population density of 208.89 persons per km^{2}. The total area was 72.34 km^{2}.
