= Hiraizumi Station =

Railway station in Hiraizumi, Iwate Prefecture, Japan

Hiraizumi Station 平泉駅
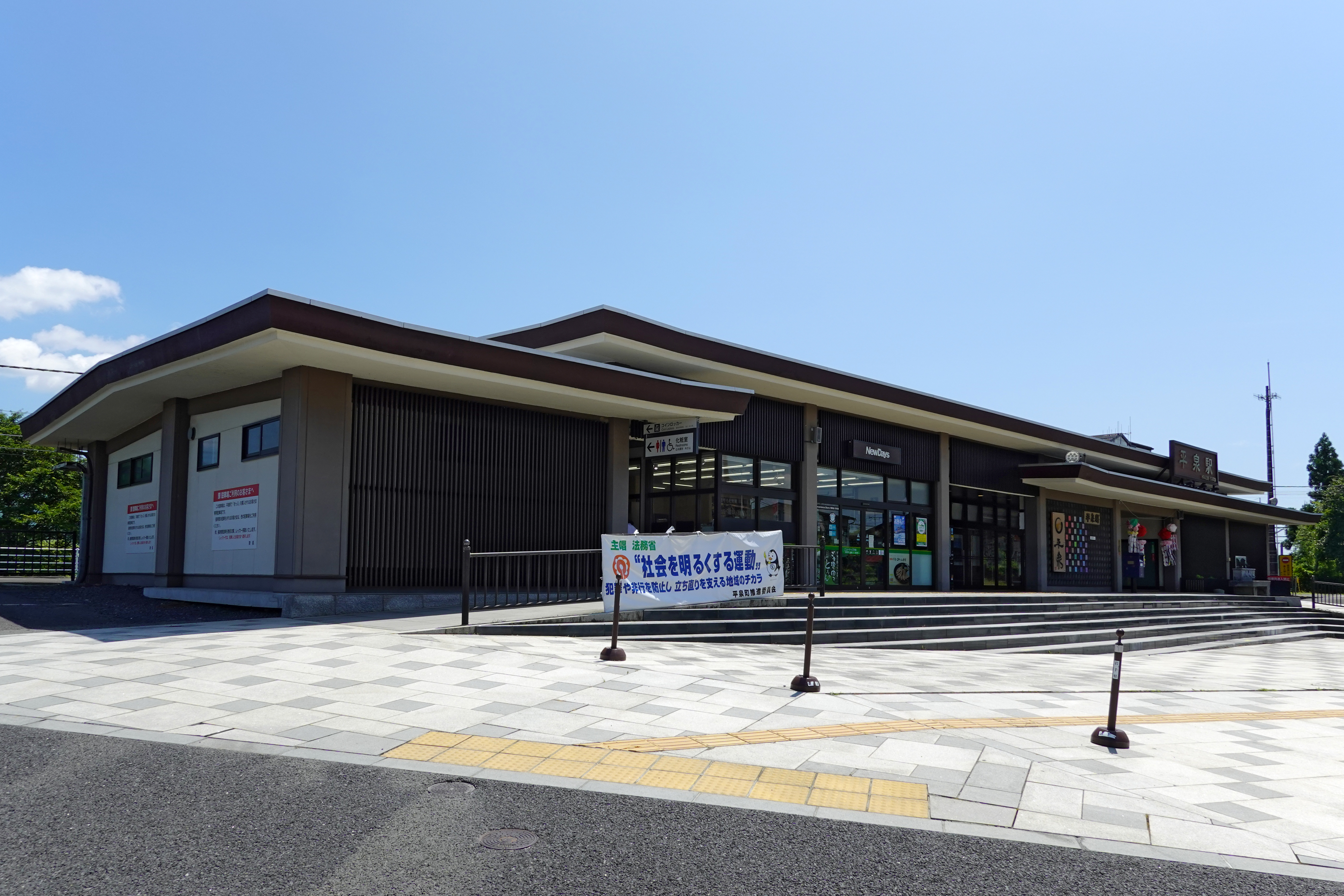
- Hiraizumi Station, July 2023

General information
- Location: Hiraizumi-aze Izumiya 76, Hiraizumi-cho, Nishiiwai-gun, Iwate-ken 029-4102; Japan
- Coordinates: 38°59′16.5″N 141°7′4.09″E
- Operator: JR East
- Line: ■ Tōhoku Main Line
- Distance: 452.30 km from Tokyo
- Platforms: 2 side platforms
- Tracks: 2

Construction
- Structure type: At grade

Other information
- Status: Staffed (Midori no Madoguchi)
- Website: Official website

History
- Opened: 25 May 1898

Passengers
- FY2018: 437

Services
Preceding station	JR East	Following station
Yamanome towards Kuroiso	Tōhoku Main Line Local	Maesawa towards Morioka
Location
- Location within Iwate Prefecture Location within Japan

Hiraizumi Station (平泉駅, Hiraizumi-eki) is a railway station in the town of Hiraizumi, Iwate, Japan, operated by East Japan Railway Company (JR East).

== Lines ==
Hiraizumi Station is served by the Tōhoku Main Line, and is located 452.3 rail kilometers from the terminus of the line at Tokyo Station.

== Station layout ==
The station has two opposed side platforms connected to the station building by a footbridge. The station has a Midori no Madoguchi staffed ticket office.

=== Platforms ===
1	■ Tōhoku Main Line	for Kitakami and Morioka
2	■ Tōhoku Main Line	for Ichinoseki

== History ==
Hiraizumi Station opened on 25 May 1898. The present station building was completed in 1966. The station was absorbed into the JR East network upon the privatization of the Japanese National Railways (JNR) on 1 April 1987.

== Passenger statistics ==
In fiscal 2018, the station was used by an average of 437 passengers daily (boarding passengers only).

== Surrounding area ==
- Chūson-ji
- Mōtsū-ji
- Hiraizumi Post Office
- Hiraizumi tourist information
- Hiraizumi Town Hall
- National Route 4

== Bus terminal ==
=== Highway buses ===
- For Sendai Station (Higashi Nippon Express)
- Ihatov; For Ōmiya Station, Kawaguchi Station, Akabane Station, and Ikebukuro Station (Iwateken Kotsu)

== See also ==
- List of railway stations in Japan
