= Isawa District, Iwate =

District in Iwate prefecture, Japan

Coordinates: 39.201°N 141.007°E

- List of Provinces of Japan > Tōsandō > Rikuchū Province > Isawa District
- Japan > Tōhoku region > Iwate Prefecture > Isawa District

Location of Isawa District in Iwate Prefecture

Isawa (胆沢郡, Isawa-gun) is a district located in Iwate Prefecture, Japan.

As of June 1, 2019, the district has an estimated population of 15,451 and a density of 86 persons per km^{2}. The total area is 179.76 km^{2}.

The district has only one town.

- Kanegasaki

== Mergers ==
- On February 20, 2006 the municipalities of Maesawa, Isawa and Koromogawa merged with the cities of Esashi and Mizusawa to form the new city of Ōshū.
