= Isawa River =

River in Iwate Prefecture, Japan

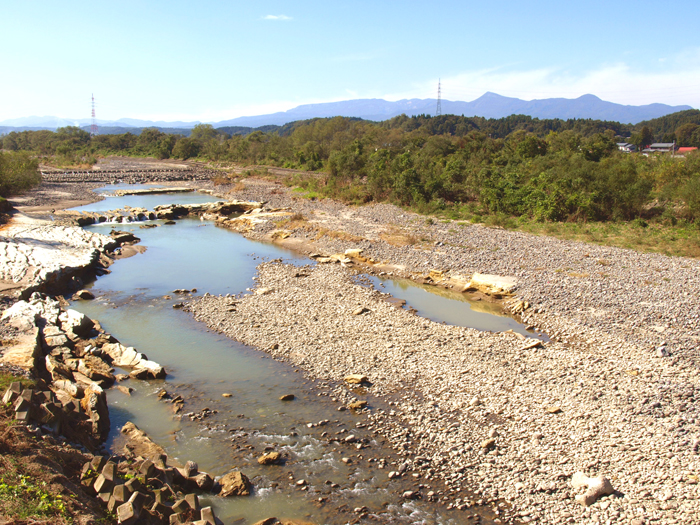
- The Isawa River from Prefectural Road 235 in Kanegasaki

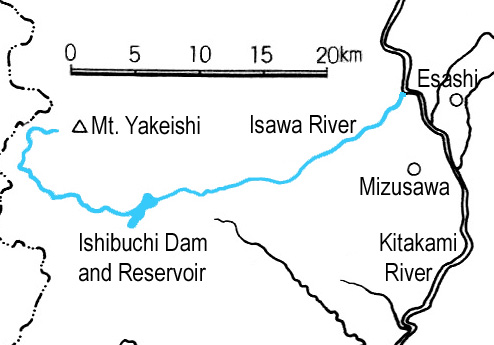
- The Isawa River and Ishibuchi Reservoir in Iwate Prefecture

- Native name: 胆沢川 (Japanese)

Location
- Country: Japan

Physical characteristics
- Source
  - location: Mt. Yakeishi, Iwate Prefecture
  - elevation: 1,000 m (3,300 ft)
- Mouth: Kitakami River
  - location: Ōshū, Iwate
  - coordinates: 39°10′55″N 141°08′35″E
- Length: 27.9 km (17.3 mi)

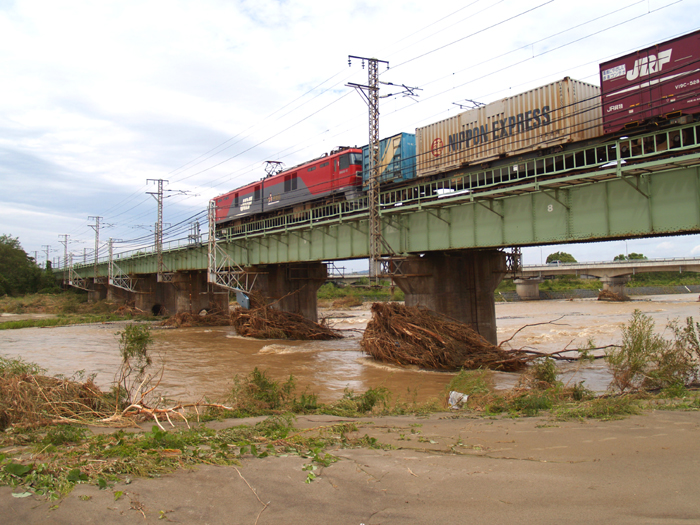
A freight train crossing the Isawa River on the JR Tohoku Mainline during a flood in September 2007

The Isawa River (胆沢川, Isawagawa) is a river in Iwate Prefecture, Japan. For about half its length it marks the border between Kanegasaki Town and Ōshū City. The river's origin is in the Ōu Mountains just west of Mt. Yakeishi (1548 meters). At its highest point it is called the Sugiyachi Stream (スギヤチ沢, Sugiyachizawa) and flows south until it crosses National Route 397. There it turns west and follows 397 until it is stopped by the Ishibuchi Dam.

In 2013 a new dam was scheduled to be completed a little downstream called the Isawa Dam. When this dam is completed the Ishibuchi Dam and reservoir will be completely flooded. Many local residents are opposed to the construction of such a large dam as the water is being impounded to provide drinking and irrigation water for use in other places. Another fear is that the great weight of the water will trigger an earthquake destroying the dam and causing a major flood. One worker on the new dam was killed by a rockslide in the 2008 Iwate–Miyagi Nairiku earthquake. The Isawa River continues its course to the east-northeast until it empties into the Kitakami River in Mizusawa Ward, Ōshū.

== History ==
In 802, after many battles with the Emishi, Sakanoue no Tamuramaro established Fort Isawa on the south side of the Isawa River where it joins the Kitakami. The location was in the very heart of the Isawa band of Emishi's territory. The Japanese invaders generally built their forts to the south of east or west flowing streams that empty into the Kitakami. The ruins are still preserved and there is a museum nearby with relics from the site.

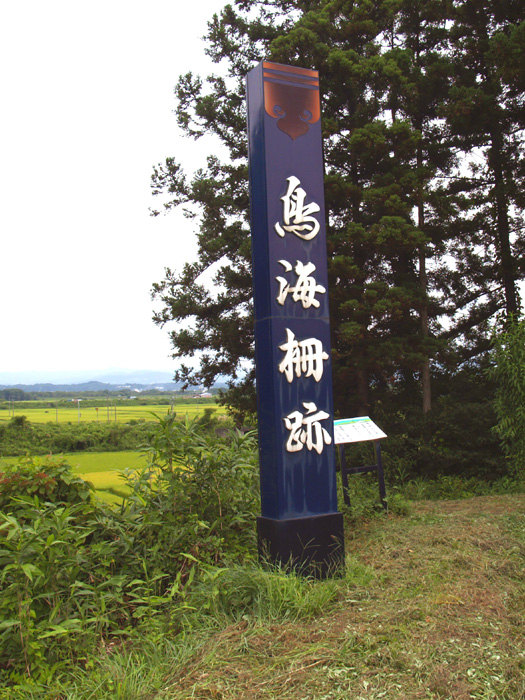
Marker at the Tonomi Palisade Ruin in Kanegasaki. View is to the east.

An opposing Emishi fort called the Tonomi Palisade (鳥海冊, tonomi-saku) was established on the north side of the Isawa at an uncertain date. In the 11th century it was occupied by Abe no Munetō. In 1061, during the Zenkunen War (前九年合戦, zenkunen kassen), Abe no Munetō defeated the Minamoto forces in the Battle of Tonomi Palisade. The Tonomi Palisade was partly obliterated by the construction of the Tōhoku Expressway but there are still ruins preserved, a graveyard and a beautiful lotus pond on the site.

In 1356 a priest of the Soto Zen sect named Douaizenji (道愛禅師, Douaizenji) founded a temple, Eitoku-ji (永徳寺, Eitoku-ji), on the north side of the Isawa River in the far west of what is now Kanegasaki. The site was chosen for its extreme isolation and remoteness to encourage meditation. During its golden age in the Kamakura period the temple claimed 408 branch temples in Kanto, Shizuoka, and Niigata.

The Tokugawa Shogunate banned Christianity in 1613, and by 1620 persecutions of Christians began to be seen in the fief of Sendai. In the Winter of 1623, a Portuguese priest named Diego de Carvalho and eight Japanese men were arrested on the upper reaches of the Isawa River where they had gone into hiding under the protection of Juan Goto, a local Christian leader. They were sent to Sendai where they were forced to stand in the freezing water of the Hirose River. Two of them drowned on the last day of the year and the rest of them died near where the Ohashi Bridge now stands on January 4, 1624.
