= Minamoto no Yoshimitsu =

Minamoto clan samurai (1045–1127)

- 源 義光
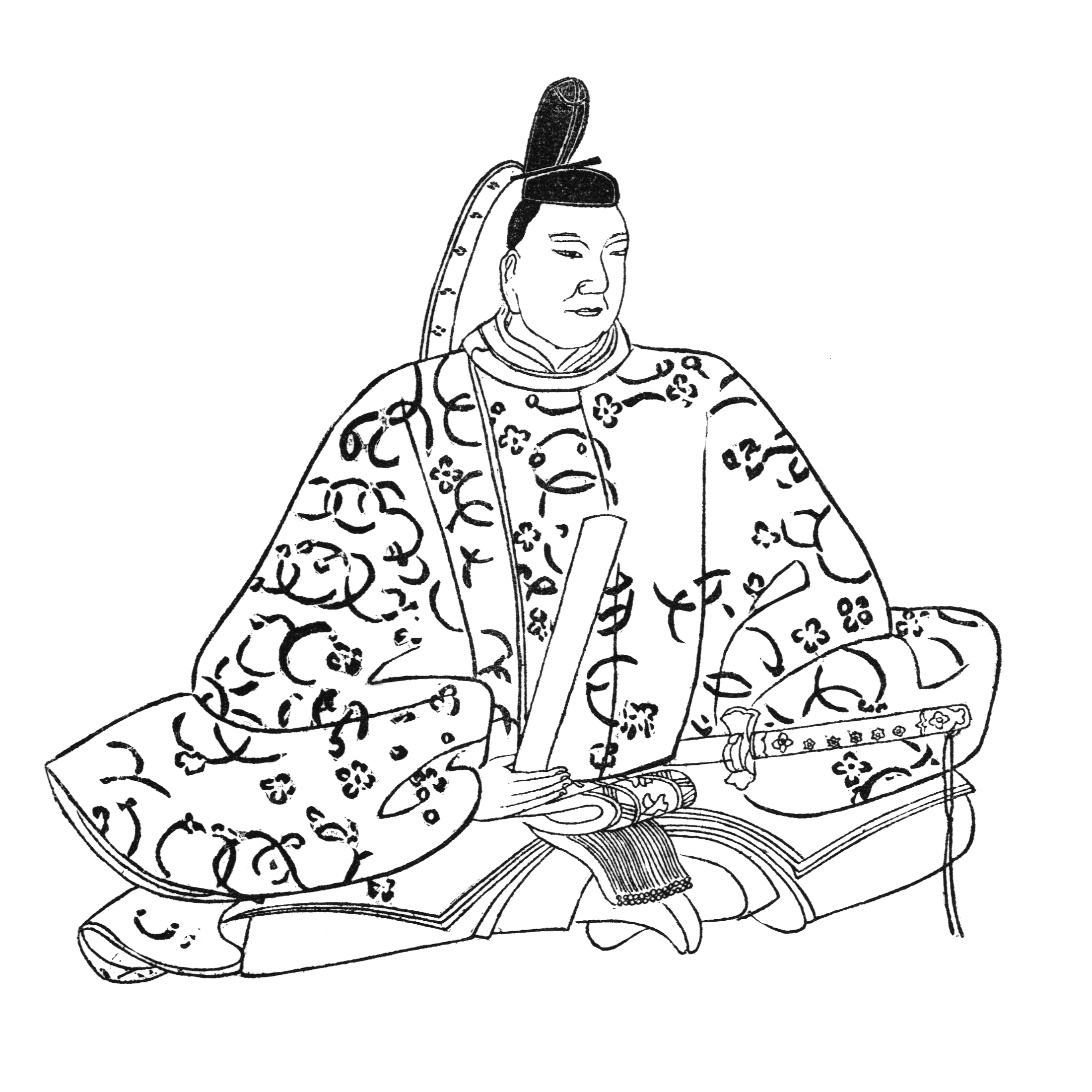
- Born: 1045
- Died: November 25, 1127 (aged 81–82)
- Other name: Shinra Saburō
- Children: Minamoto no Yoshikiyo; Minamoto no Yoshinori; Minamoto no Moriyoshi; Minamoto no Chikayoshi
- Military career
- Allegiance: Minamoto clan
- Branch: Kawachi Genji
- Units: Minamoto no Yoshiie; Minamoto no Yoshitsuna
- Conflicts: Later Three-Year War

Minamoto no Yoshimitsu (源 義光; 1045 – November 25, 1127) was a Japanese samurai lord during the Heian period. He served as Governor of Kai Province. He is credited as the ancient progenitor of the Japanese martial art, Daitō-ryū aiki-jūjutsu and Takeda-ryū.

== Biography ==
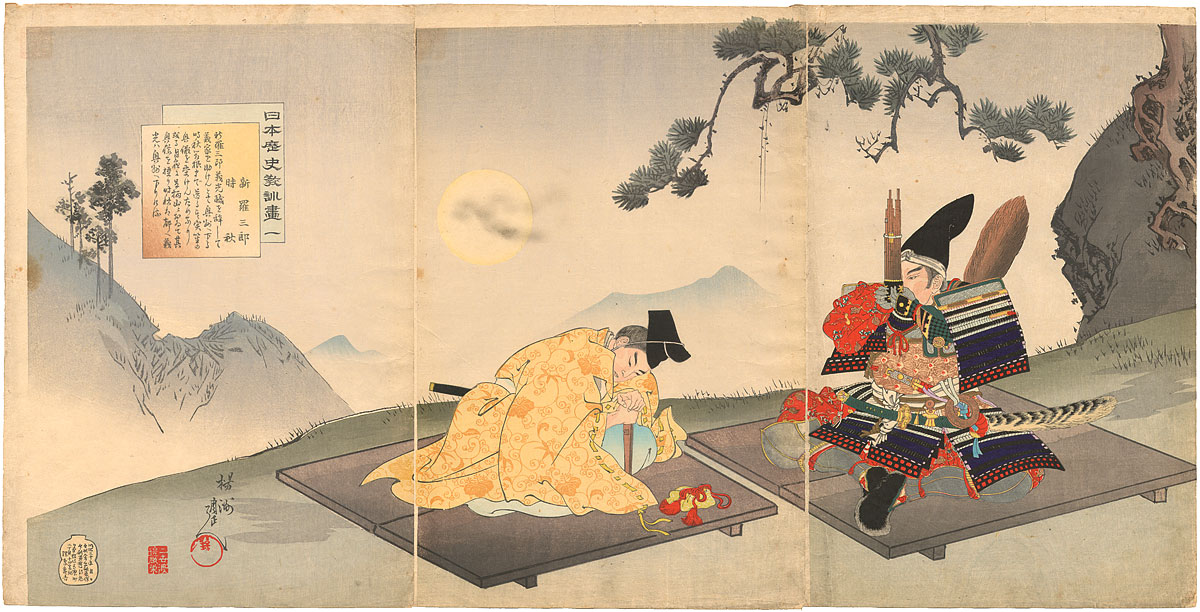
Minamoto no Yoshimitsu was famous in horsemanship and archery, here playing the musical instrument shō

Yoshimitsu was born the son of Chinjufu-shōgun Minamoto no Yoriyoshi (988-1075) of the Minamoto clan. His brother was the famous Minamoto no Yoshiie. He was also known as Shinra Saburō (新羅 三郎), a nickname that comes from the Shinra Zenjindo Hall of Mii-dera Temple, where he had his coming-of-age ceremony. His Dharma name was Senkōin Shuntoku Sonryō (先甲院峻徳尊了). Ōe no Masafusa taught Yoshimitsu the Sho. He was skilled in horsemanship and archery.

According to Daitō-ryū's initial history, Yoshimitsu dissected the corpses of men killed in battle, and studied them for the purpose of learning vital point striking (kyusho-jitsu) and joint lock techniques. Daitō-ryū takes its name from that of a mansion that Yoshimitsu lived in as a child, called "Daitō", in Ōmi Province (modern-day Shiga Prefecture).

For military service during the Later Three-Year War (1083–1089), Yoshimitsu was made Governor of Kai Province (modern-day Yamanashi Prefecture), where he settled. He fought his nephew Minamoto no Yoshikuni over land. When his older brother Yoshiie died he planned the death of his nephew and fourth generational Kawachi Genji leader Minamoto no Yoshitada because he wanted to be the leader of the clan. He then blamed his brother Minamoto no Yoshitsuna for Yoshitada’s death.

Yoshimitsu's son, Minamoto no Yoshikiyo, took the surname "Takeda" and is also known as Takeda Yoshikiyo, and the techniques Yoshimitsu discovered would be secretly passed down within the Takeda clan until the late 19th century, when Takeda Sokaku (Daitō-ryū) and Oba Ichio (Takeda-ryū) have started to teach them to the public. He is the ancestor of the Takeda clan.

One of Japan's oldest flags is housed at the Unpo-ji temple in Kōshū city, Yamanashi Prefecture. Legend states it was given by Emperor Go-Reizei to Minamoto no Yoshimitsu and has been treated as a family treasure by the Takeda clan for the past 1,000 years, and at least it is older than 16th century.

== Legends ==
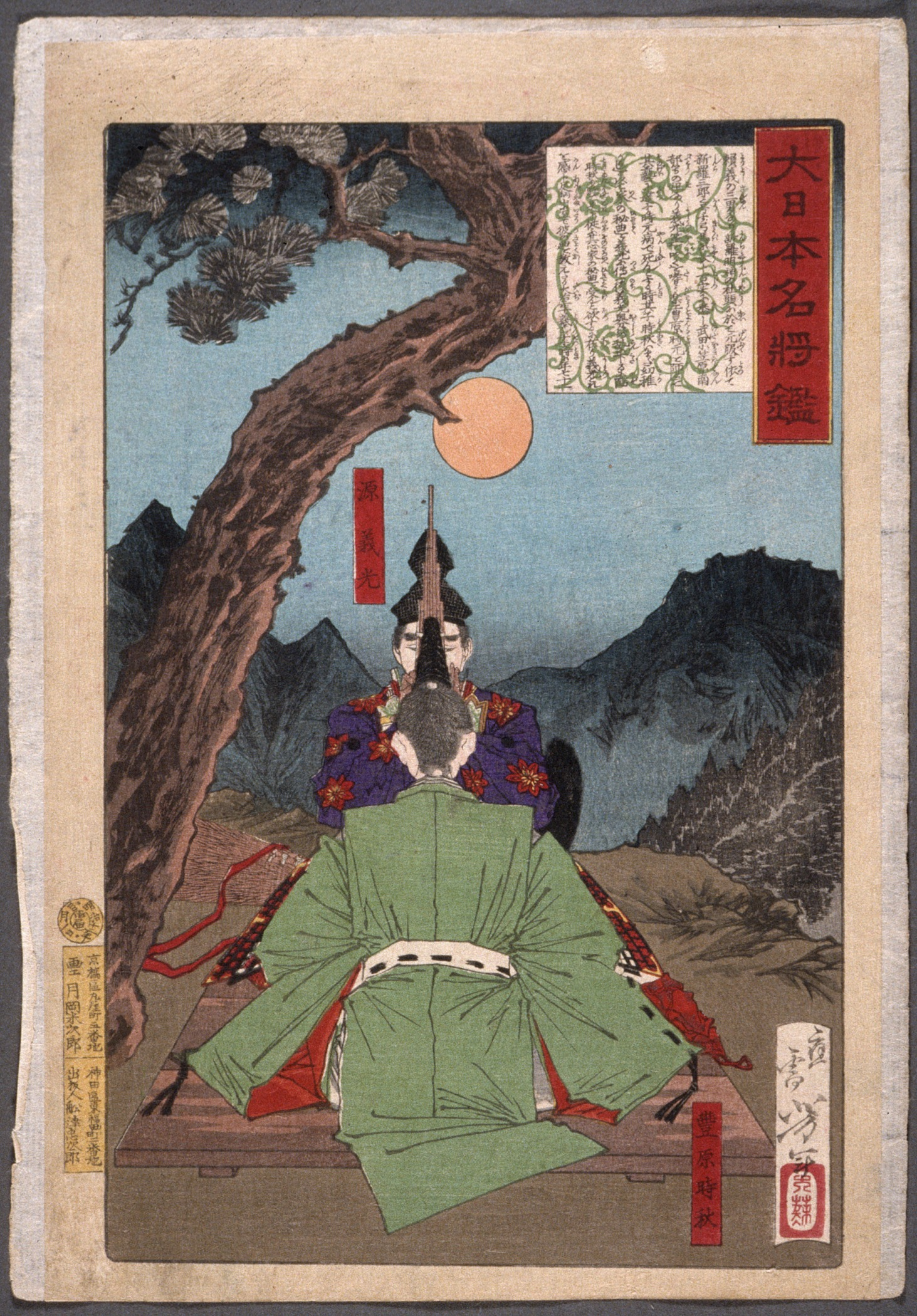
Minamoto Yoshimitsu Instructing Toyohara Tokiaki.

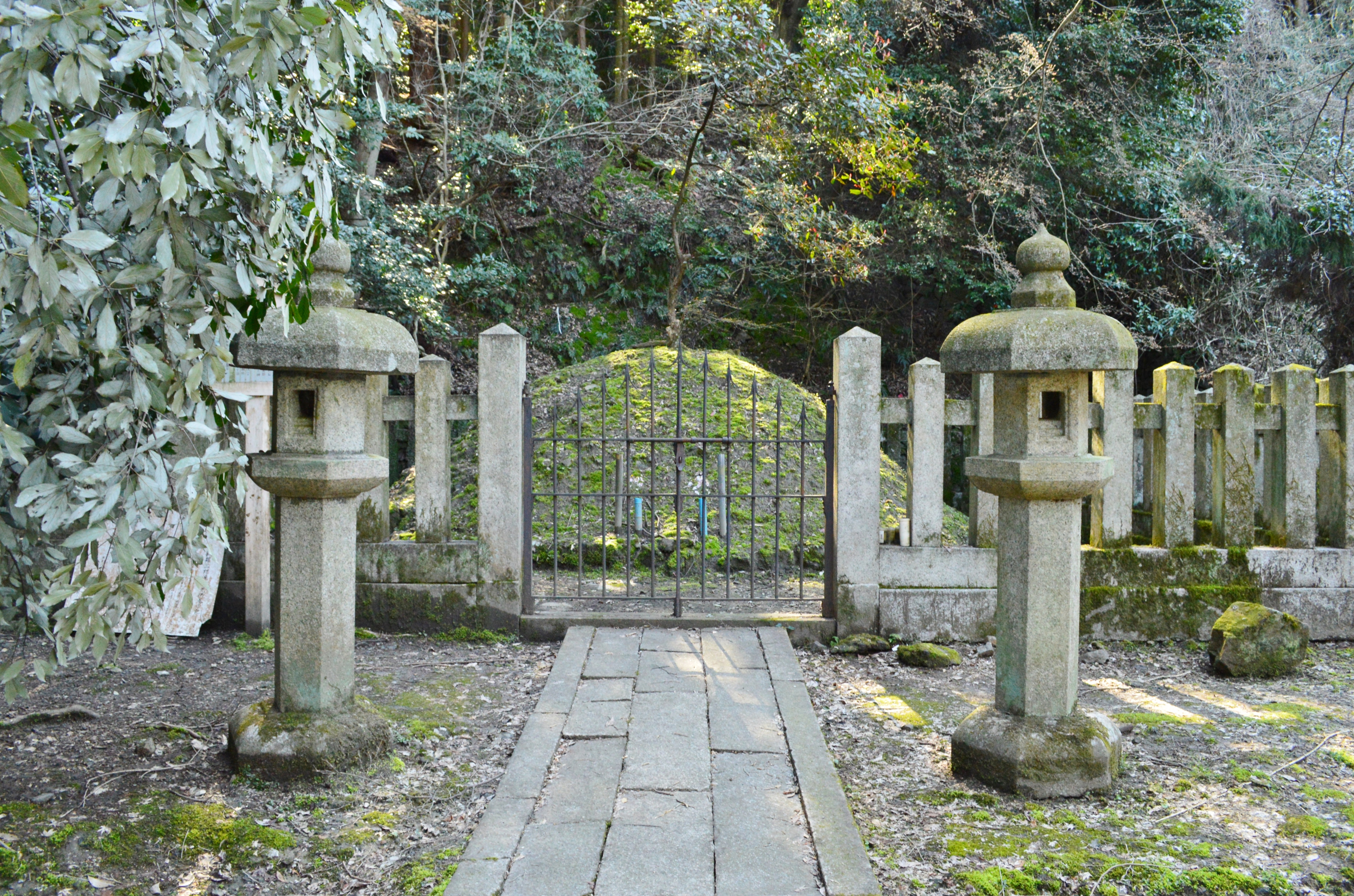
Tomb of Minamoto-no-Yoshimitsu

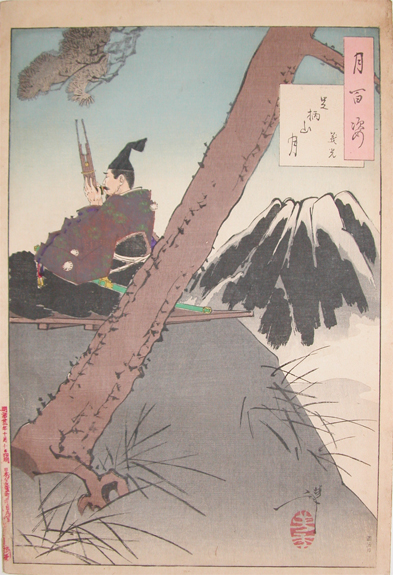
Yoshitoshi - 100 Aspects of the Moon - 70

The history of Daito-ryu up until the end of the Edo period is based on scrolls and oral traditions passed down from Takeda Sokaku and Takeda Tokimune. According to them, the name "Daito-ryu" originated about 900 years ago from Shinra Saburo Minamoto Yoshimitsu (1045-1127), who could be considered the school's distant ancestor. As a child, Yoshimitsu lived in the Daito mansion in Omi and was also called Daito Saburo. The name "Daito-ryu" is based on this.

Shinra Saburo Minamoto Yoshimitsu studied military science such as Sun Tzu and Wu Tzu, served the Imperial Court as Sahyoe no Jō, and was a general in both literature and martial arts who mastered the ways of sumo and Aiki-jūjutsu. The Aiki-jūjutsu that Yoshimitsu perfected was an addition to the secret techniques passed down in the Genji family. If we trace the origins of Aiki-jūjutsu back to the ancient Tegoi (hand-begging). The Kojiki, one of Japan's oldest books, tells the story of Takemikazuchi-no-Kami taking Takeminakata-no-Kami's hand and "grabbing it as if it were a reed and throwing it with his sword."

This tego is said to be the beginning of sumo, and has been passed down from the legends of Nomi no Sukune and Taima no Kehaya, who appear in the Nihon Shoki, to the sumo festivals held at the Imperial Court during the Heian period and samurai sumo during the Kamakura period. Sumo festivals would bring together wrestlers from all over the country to wrestle in front of the emperor, but unlike today's sumo, there was no sumo ring and it had a strong martial arts element that originated from tego. This can also be seen in the imperial edict of Emperor Ninmyo (810-850), which states, "Sumo is not merely entertainment. It is the practice of military force that is the most important part of it."

In the 10th year of the Jogan era (868) of Emperor Seiwa (850-880), the Sumo Festival, which had previously been under the jurisdiction of the Ministry of Ceremonies, was transferred to the Ministry of War, and sumo took on a more martial arts character. The form of protecting the emperor by begging was inherited by the Seiwa Genji clan, beginning with Emperor Seiwa's grandson, Prince Minamoto Tsunemoto, and continued from Tsunemoto to Minamoto no Mitsunaka, Yoriyoshi, and Yoshimitsu.

Yoshimitsu was appointed Kai no Kami for his military achievements in the Gosannen War, and in his later years, he trained his mind and body at the Onjoji Esoteric Buddhist training hall under the name of Oyabu Nyudo, and is said to have mastered invincible supernatural powers and divine inspiration. This was the origin of Daito-ryu, which broke away from the so-called begging.

Yoshimitsu gave his second son, Yoshikiyo, the flag and armor Shieldless handed down from the Minamoto clan and made him his successor. During the time of Yoshikiyo's grandson, Takeda Nobuyoshi (1128–1186), he is said to have lived in Takeda Village, Kitakoma County, Kai Province, and took the name of Takeda. This was the beginning of the Kai Takeda clan, which would later be linked to Takeda Shingen (1521-1573). The Takeda clan inherited the flag and armor handed down from the Minamoto clan, and also passed down the Daito style.

- Kannon Bodhisattva who saved the founder of the Kai Genji clan

The principal image, the Eleven-Headed Kannon Bodhisattva (Yorido Kannon), was enshrined at Yoroido along with the armor of Shinra Saburo Yoshimitsu, founder of the Kai Genji clan. During the Oshu War—both the War of Nine Years (1051–62) and the War of Three Years (1083–87)—Yoshimitsu’s brother Yoshiie carried the Kannon Bodhisattva to bolster the army, and legend holds that a mysterious, fierce general appeared to defend him. Historically, this Kannon was also revered as a guardian of horses, drawing many devotees from the Saku area on Hatsuuma (the first day of the horse after the start of spring) and Ninouma. On Hatsuuma in particular, the area was lively with stalls, theaters, and show huts. Though slightly off the main path, the magnificent main hall and votive plaques depicting horses are well worth seeing.

== Family ==
- Father: Chinjufu-shōgun Minamoto no Yoriyoshi
- Mother: daughter of Taira no Naokata
- Wife: daughter of Taira no Kiyomoto, of the Hitachi Heishi (Taira) branch
- Children:
- Minamoto no Yoshinori (Satake)
- Minamoto no Yoshikiyo (Takeda)
- Minamoto no Moriyoshi (Hiraga)
- Minamoto no Chikayoshi (Okada)

== Family tree ==
Emperor Seiwa
Prince Sadazumi	Emperor Yōzei
Minamoto no Tsunemoto
Minamoto no Mitsunaka
Kawachi Genji	Yamato Genji	Settsu Genji
Minamoto no Yorinobu	Minamoto no Yorichika	Minamoto no Yorimitsu
Minamoto no Yoriyoshi	Minamoto no Yorikuni
Mino Genji
Minamoto no Yoshimitsu	Minamoto no Yoshiie	Minamoto no Yoritsuna	Minamoto no Kunifusa
