= Minamoto no Yoshikiyo =

Minamoto no Yoshikiyo (源 義清; 1075?–1149?) was a samurai warlord of the late Heian period. He was the son of Minamoto no Yoshimitsu, who was son of the Chinjufu-shōgun Minamoto no Yoriyoshi, and brother of famous Minamoto no Yoshiie (known as Hachimantaro).

When Minamoto no Yoshimitsu received Takeda domain in Hitachi Province from his father in law Taira no Kiyomoto, he gave it to his son Minamoto no Yoshikiyo, and Yoshikiyo called himself Takeda Yoshikiyo. According to "Choshuki" and "Sonpi Bunmyaku" (a text compiled in the fourteenth century that records the lineages of the aristocracy), Yoshikiyo went to Kai Province and resided at Ichikawa no sho estate. He built Wakamiko Castle, which was in Tama no sho estate, and also moved to Henmi no sho estate in the northwestern part of Kai Province. The descendants of Yoshikiyo settled in various places in Kai province, and became the Kai-Genji. Kai is from Kai Province, and Genji is the Chinese reading of their family name (Minamoto). He then founded the Takeda line, also known as Kai Genji Takeda.

== Family ==
- Father: Minamoto no Yoshimitsu (1045-1127)
- Mother: daughter of Taira no Kiyomoto, of the Hitachi Heishi branch
