= Tsuchigumo Sōshi =

Tsuchigumo Sōshi (土蜘蛛草紙) is a 14th-century Japanese picture scroll depicting the heroic exploits of Minamoto no Raikō in his battle against an enormous spider monster.

== Authorship and date ==
The pictures in Tsuchigumo Sōshi are traditionally attributed to the artist Tosa Nagataka (土佐 長隆), who is also credited with the famous Illustrated Account of the Mongol Invasion, while the text is traditionally attributed to the Buddhist teacher Kenkō, famed for his Essays in Idleness. While these attributions are uncertain, (Note: The attribution to Nagataka and Kenkō was made in the 18th century, apparently by the prominent court painter Tosa Mitsuyoshi, but Kenkō was born in 1283, during Nagataka's productive period. Reider states that there is "no proof" of the attribution, while Honda calls it a "pretense".) the scroll itself is generally dated to the early 14th century, or the latter part of Japan's Kamakura period.

== Genre ==
Tsuchigumo Sōshi is a picture scroll, or emaki. Noriko Tsunoda Reider of Miami University identifies it as an example of an otogi-zōshi, or Muromachi-period fiction, and it was included in Volume 9 of the Collection of Tales of the Muromachi Period (室町時代物語大成 Muromachi-jidai Monogatari Taisei), in spite of its technically dating to the end of the Kamakura period. The artwork is in the yamato-e style.

== Contents ==
Although the scroll was produced in the early 14th century, it depicts the exploits the famous 10th-century warrior Minamoto no Raikō (also known as Minamoto no Yorimitsu) and his retainer Watanabe no Tsuna as they encounter a tsuchigumo or giant earth spider. It consists of nine paragraphs of text and thirteen illustrations.

As the story begins, Raikō and Tsuna arrive at the cemetery of Rendaino, in the Kitayama (ja), a hilly region of the northern outskirts of Kyoto. The two men there encounter a single skull that floats in the air and rises up into the clouds, and, seeking to find out where it is going, they follow it to Kaguraoka. There, they find a large, old mansion. Raikō orders his retainer to wait outside as he ventures inside and finds an old woman. Upon his asking her age, she tells them that she is 290 years old, and has served nine generations of lords of this house. She rambles on about various matters and Raikō goes searching for his own answers. Tsuna joins his master, and they encounter various yōkai: possessed household utensils, a nun with a massive head, and a beautiful young woman who throws balls with the appearance of white cloud at Raikō. Raikō strikes at the woman with his sword, but it goes straight through her and crashes against the floor, cleaving in twain the foundation stone of the house. The woman fades from view, and Raikō pulls up his sword, which is broken and stained with white blood.

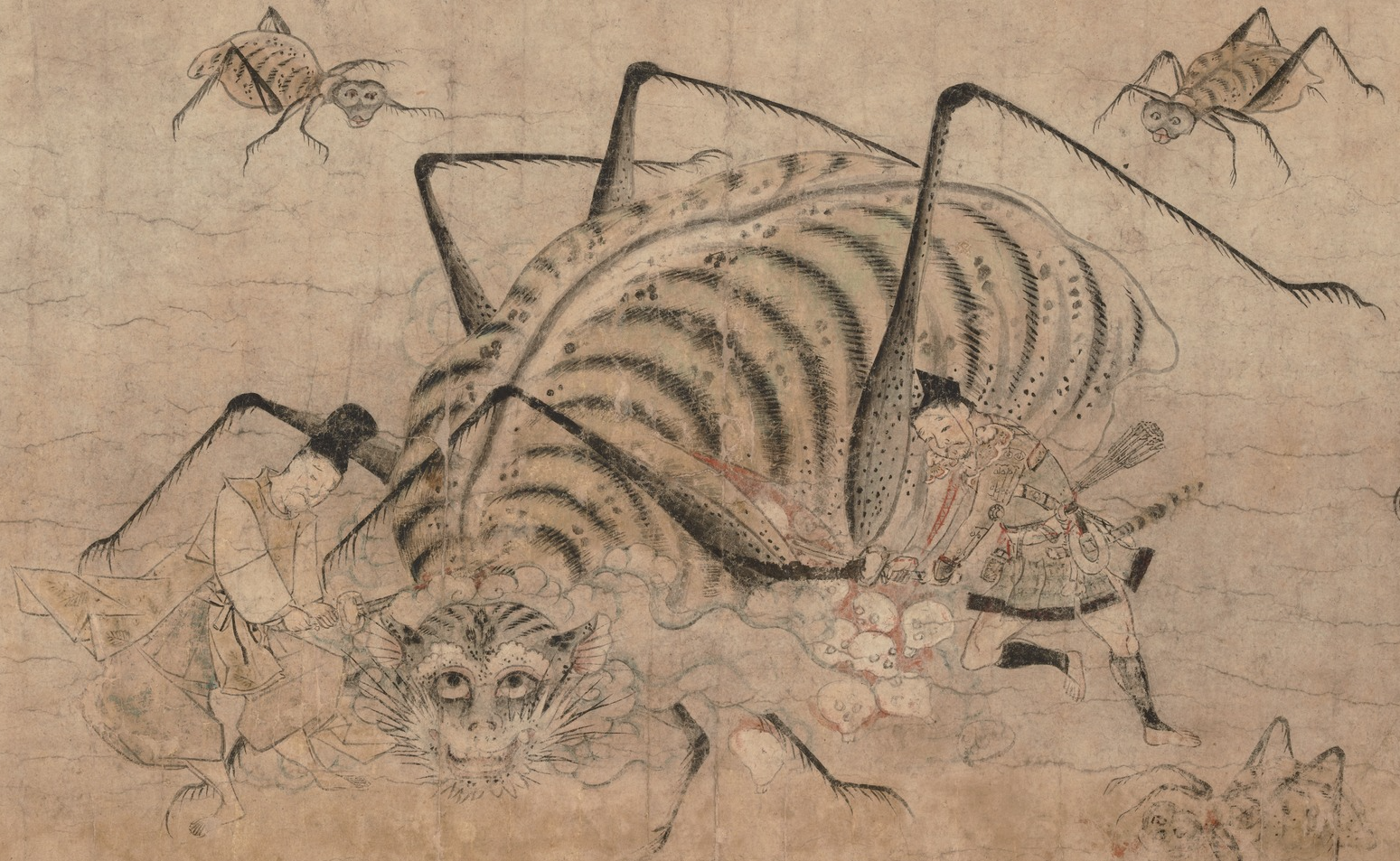
Raikō decapitates the enormous spider while Tsuna cuts into its torso and several other human-sized spiders skitter about.

Raikō and Tsuna follow the trail of blood until it leads them to a cave in Nishiyama (ja). At the entrance to the cave, Raikō, looking at his broken sword, is reminded of the tale of Mikenjaku of the kingdom of Chu, who took a broken sword and struck down the king. He crafts an effigy out of his broken sword and heads into the cave. Before long, the two companions encounter an enormous beast some 20 jō, or around 60 metres, in length, with bright, shining eyes. The tip of Raikō's sword shoots out of the shadows and collapses the effigy, and after a struggle, in which Raikō calls on divine aid from Amaterasu, the sun goddess, and Shō Hachimangū, his family's patron, they eventually manage to bring down the creature—a yamagumo ("mountain spider"). As swift as lightning, Raikō decapitates the beast with his broken sword, and Tsuna goes for the belly, where he finds that it is already cut open—Raikō's handiwork from their previous encounter at the old house. Out from this pour some 1,900 skulls, cutting open its side causes a large number of smaller spiders, each around the size of a human child, to emerge, and digging around in its stomach they find about twenty more very small skulls. The two dig a grave and bury the skulls, before setting fire to the manor that had housed the monstrous spider.

The emperor, hearing this story, rewards Raikō's valorous deed with the governorship of Tsu Province, and promotes him to the Senior Fourth Rank, Lower Grade. To Tsuna, he awards the province of Tanba, promoting him to the Senior Fifth Rank, Lower Grade.

== List of yōkai ==
A number of different monstrous apparitions appear to the two heroes. These are:

- Dokuro, a floating skull that appears at the start of the story.
- Tsuchigumo, an enormous "earth spider", and the principal antagonist of the story. Also called a yamakumo, or "mountain spider".
- An unnaturally long-lived woman, claiming to be 290 years of age, with ghostly white hair, large lips that are tied around her neck, and breasts sagging to her lap like robes.
- A small creature, three feet in height, of which the face accounts for two feet and the body only one, with tiny legs, arms as thin as string, skin as white as snow, thick eyebrows, red lips that lay open to reveal two blackened teeth. She wore the garb of a Buddhist nun, with a purple hat and red hakama, but nothing on the upper half of her body.
- A strikingly beautiful woman, whose looks would surely put even Yang Guifei and Lady Li to shame, who dazzles Raikō before kicking up the hem of her skirts and hurling balls of white cloud at him, temporarily blinding him.

An image of two oni included in the scroll but not directly alluded to in the text.

- Two figures not mentioned in the text are, however, depicted in the accompanying illustrations, apparently the oni Gozu and Mezu.
- "[N]umerous spirits and goblins of various shapes and sizes".

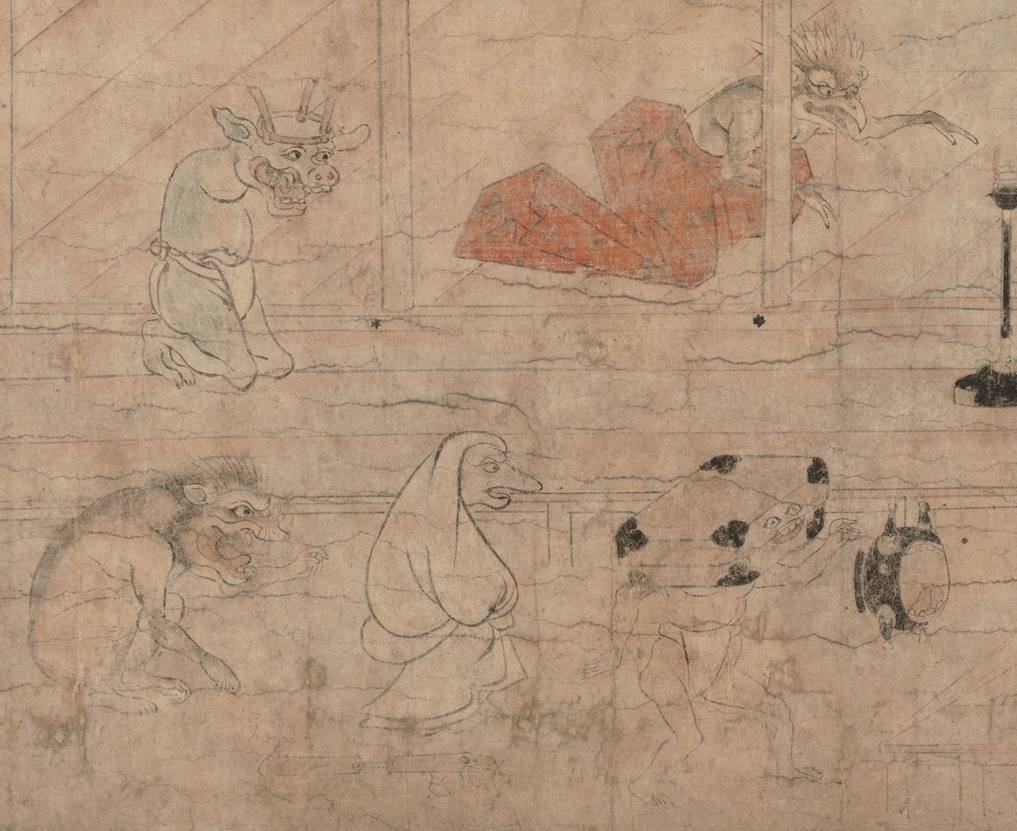
Numerous other unspecified yōkai approach Raikō.

Against these malignant yōkai, the hero calls upon his divine ancestors, the kami of Japan, Hachiman and Amaterasu, alluding to his own imperial ancestry (his grandfather, Minamoto no Tsunemoto, was a son of Emperor Seiwa).

== Textual tradition ==
The most famous scroll is in the holdings of Tokyo National Museum, but a slightly different version is held by Keio University Library, which is in two scrolls and is entitled Tsuchigumo (土ぐも).

== Influence ==
Reider suggests that Tsuchigumo Sōshi should be placed alongside the much earlier Nihon Shoki, the slightly early Heike Tsuruginomaki, and the later Noh play Tsuchigumo, as an important source for the popular Japanese image of a ferocious "earth spider" known as a tsuchigumo. The tale is also known as an episode of the Taiheiki, a 14th-century Japanese chronicle attributed to Kojima.
