= Taira no Tadatsune =

Samurai lord and rebel of the early Heian period

Taira no Tadatsune (平 忠常; October 19, 975? - June 28, 1031) was a Japanese samurai lord and gōzoku in the Heian period. He was the head of the Taira clan in the early 11th century, and an ancestor of the Chiba clan. He served as Governor of Shimōsa and Vice-Governor of Kazusa Provinces, and managed the Ise Grand Shrine in fact if not in name.

In 1028, Tadatsune resigned from the office of Vice-Governor of Kazusa, and attacked Kazusa and Awa Provinces, seeking to expand his power base. Though at first having a slow rection in which it took four months to send a punitive force against him, the Imperial Court sought to stop him, and nominated Minamoto no Yorinobu, Governor of Ise Province, to lead the attack; he refused. The Court then appointed Taira no Naokata and Nakahara Narimichi, who were recalled soon afterwards, after making no progress.

The Governor of Awa Province fled to Kyoto in 1030, and the following year, Minamoto no Yoriyoshi rose to the occasion, after being appointed Governor of Kai Province. Knowing he could not defeat Yorinobu, Tadatsune surrendered without a fight, and was taken prisoner, perishing on the way to the capital.

== See also ==
Taira no Tadatsune disturbance

== Bibliography ==
- Sansom, George (1958). 'A History of Japan to 1334'. Stanford, California: Stanford University Press.
