= Tsuchigumo =

Japanese folklore creature

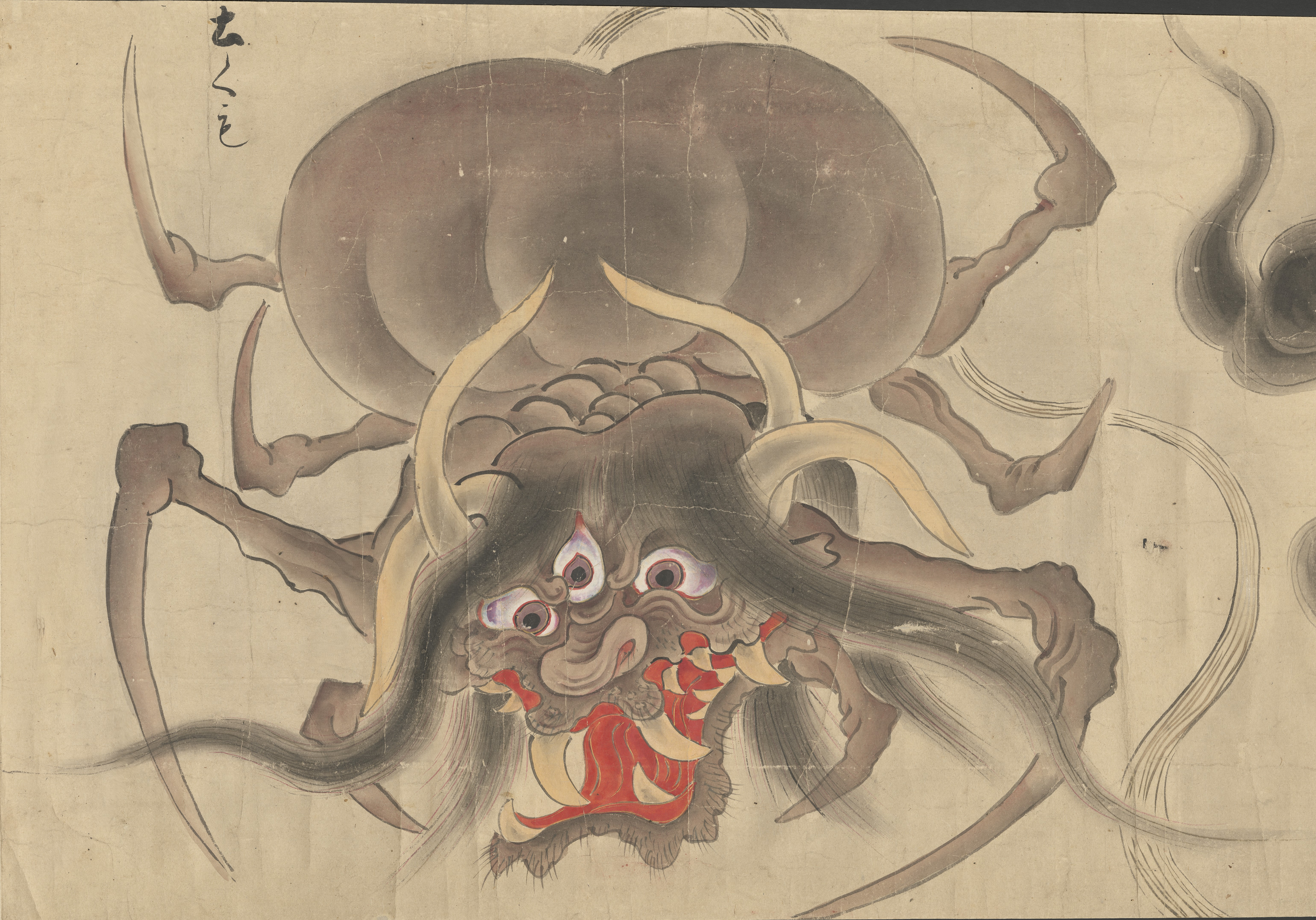
Tsuchigumo, from Bakemono no e scroll, Brigham Young University

Tsuchigumo (土蜘蛛; also written 土雲, literally "dirt/earth spider") is a historical Japanese derogatory term for renegade local clans, primarily during the Asuka, Nara, and early Heian periods, and also the name for a race of spider-like yōkai in Japanese folklore. Alternative names for the historical groups include kuzu (国栖), and for the mythological Tsuchigumo, yatsukahagi (八握脛; roughly "eight-grasp shins," referring to their long legs) and ōgumo (大蜘蛛; "giant spider"). In the Kojiki and Nihon Shoki, the name was phonetically spelled with the four kanji 都知久母 (for the four morae tsu-chi-gu-mo). References to "tsuchigumo" appear in the chronicles associated with Emperor Jimmu, Emperor Keiko, and Empress Jingū, and these words were frequently used in the Fudoki (ancient reports on provincial culture, geography, and oral tradition) of various provinces, including Mutsu, Echigo, Hitachi, Settsu, Bungo, and Hizen.

The term "Tsuchigumo" (earth/dirt spider) is believed to be derived from an older derogatory term, tuchigomori (土隠), meaning "those who hide in the ground". This name likely referred to the fact that many of these clans utilized existing cave systems or built fortified dugouts and earthworks (Japanese: 土窟; tsuchi-muro or iwa-muro) in which to live and defend themselves. The term was used by the Yamato court as a generalized pejorative against chieftains and clans who would not submit to Imperial authority, regardless of their ancestry or location. They were often described in official records like the Nihon Shoki and various Fudoki as possessing "the nature of a wolf, the heart of an owl", being violently resistant, and dwelling in mountain caves or earthen fortifications. Some descriptions portrayed them as having abnormal physical characteristics; the "Jimmu" chapter of the Nihon Shoki describes them as "short in stature but long in limbs, similar to pygmies (侏儒)", while an excerpt from the lost Echigo Fudoki mentions Tsuchigumo with "shins eight 'tsuka' [hand-breadths] long, and possessing great strength." These descriptions likely served to dehumanize these groups and emphasize their "otherness" from the perspective of the Yamato state.

Historian Sōkichi Tsuda (ja) pointed out that, unlike terms like Kumaso and Emishi which referred to distinct groups, "Tsuchigumo" as used in the Fudoki often appears as the designation for specific individuals rather than entire peoples. Historian Yoshiyuki Takioto (ja) further suggests that these individuals were likely local chieftains whose power stemmed from shamanistic authority. This is supported by accounts in the Kyushu Fudoki where certain Tsuchigumo figures appear as priests or mediums involved in agricultural rituals or appeasing angered deities (kami).

The transformation of the Tsuchigumo into a monstrous, giant spider-like yōkai occurred during the Japanese medieval period (late 12th to early 17th centuries). One of the earliest and most influential depictions is found in variant texts of The Tale of the Heike, particularly the "Sword Scroll" (tsurugi-no-maki), which was compiled in the early 13th century. In this version, the creature is called a yamagumo (山蜘蛛, "mountain spider"), and its defeat by the hero Minamoto no Yorimitsu gives rise to the legend of his sword, Kumo-kiri ("Spider-Cutter"). As depictions evolved through later periods, the Tsuchigumo became increasingly bizarre and monstrous. The 14th-century emakimono (picture scroll) Tsuchigumo Sōshi portrays it as a colossal monster, and stories involving its extermination often feature Yorimitsu and his legendary retainer Watanabe no Tsuna, heroes also famous for defeating the powerful oni Shuten-dōji. The yōkai Tsuchigumo became a popular subject in Noh theatre, Jōruri puppet plays, and Kabuki. The historical Tsuchigumo have no direct connection to the actual ground spider species Jigumo (Antrodiaetus japonicus). Similarly, the modern Japanese common name for tarantulas (Ōtsuchigumo-ka, オオツチグモ科, Theraphosidae) which was inspired by the mythological creature has no historical link, as tarantulas are not native to Japan.

== In history ==
References to Tsuchigumo appear across Japan, indicating the term was applied to various local powers resisting Yamato authority. Historical records mention Tsuchigumo in at least seven locations in Hitachi province, six in Bungo, twelve in Hizen, two in Mutsu, and one in Hyūga, primarily in Kyushu, Tōhoku, and Kantō regions. Around 45 individual chieftain names associated with Tsuchigumo are recorded, among which 14 include titles like "me" (女, woman), "hime" (姫/媛, princess), suggesting female leadership was not uncommon, particularly in Hizen. Examples include Ōyamada-me (大山田女), Sayamada-me (狭山田女), Yasome (八十女), and Hayakitsu-hime (速来津姫). The Hitachi no Kuni Fudoki explicitly states that "Kuzu" and "Tsuchigumo" were synonymous terms in that region.

=== Yamato Province ===
The Tsuchigumo of the Katsuragi region in Yamato Province (modern Nara Prefecture) are particularly well-known. According to the Nihon Shoki, Emperor Jimmu defeated several Tsuchigumo groups during his eastward expedition. These included figures named Niki Tobe (新城戸畔) at Hataoka-no-saki, Kose Hafuri (居勢祝) at Wani-no-saka-no-shita, and Ihafuri (猪祝) at Hetsugi-no-nagae-no-oka-no-saki. He is also said to have defeated Tsuchigumo at Takaowari village by weaving a net of katsura vines (葛), subsequently renaming the area Katsuragi (葛城). The Tsuchigumo of Takaowari were described as having small bodies and long limbs. Katsuragi Hitokotonushi Shrine (葛城一言主神社) features a "Tsuchigumo塚" (tsuka, mound), said to be where Jimmu buried the head, body, and feet of captured Tsuchigumo separately to prevent their vengeful spirits (onryō) from harming the living.

A unique physical characteristic attributed to the indigenous people of Yamato in early chronicles was the possession of tails. The Nihon Shoki describes the ancestor of the Yoshino no Futo (吉野首) clan as "glowing, with a tail", and the ancestor of the Yoshino no Kuzu (国樔) as "having a tail and pushing aside rocks". Similarly, the Kojiki refers to the people of Osaka (忍坂, modern Sakurai city) as "Tsuchigumo who have tails grown." These descriptions likely served to portray the pre-Yamato inhabitants as non-human or primitive.

=== Other regions and Emperor Keiko's campaigns ===
Several accounts detail conflicts during the reign of Emperor Keiko (traditionally 71–130 AD):

- Hizen Province: The Hizen no Kuni Fudoki records that during an imperial visit to Shiki island (志式島, likely part of modern Hirado Island) around year 72, smoke was seen rising from nearby islands. Investigation revealed Tsuchigumo named Ōmimi (大耳) on the smaller island and Taremimi (垂耳) on the larger one. When captured and facing execution, they prostrated themselves, offered fish products, and pledged allegiance, thus securing their pardon. The same text relates the story of Tsuchigumo Yasome (土蜘蛛八十女) in Kijima county. "Yaso" (八十) means "eighty" but here signifies "many", suggesting multiple female leaders resisted the Yamato forces. Yasome, popular among her people, reportedly fortified herself in the mountains but was ultimately defeated and her forces annihilated. This story is often interpreted as representing the heroic but tragic resistance of female chieftains against Yamato expansion. It's noted that another local female leader reported Yasome's location to the emperor and was spared for her cooperation. Conversely, Hayakitsu-hime (速来津姫) of Hayaki in Sonogi county submitted peacefully to Emperor Keiko, offering three valuable pearls (natural pearls called shiratama, isonokami mokurenji-tama, utsukushiki-tama).
- Bungo Province: The Bungo no Kuni Fudoki mentions numerous Tsuchigumo figures: Itsuma-hime (五馬姫) of Itsuma mountain (五馬山); Uchisaru (打猴), Unasaru (頸猴), Yata (八田), and Kunimaro (國摩侶) of Negi field (禰宜野); Shinokaomi (小竹鹿臣) and Shinokaosa (小竹鹿奥) of Amashi field (網磯野); and Ao (青) and Shiro (白) of Nezumi cavern (鼠の磐窟).
- Nihon Shoki Account (Keiko): According to the Nihon Shoki, in the winter of the 12th year of Emperor Keiko's reign (legendary year 82), the emperor arrived in Hayami town, Ōkita county (modern Ōita Prefecture). The local queen, Hayatsuhime (速津媛), informed him of two Tsuchigumo named Ao (青) and Shiro (白) living in the nearby Nezumi cave (鼠の石窟, Rat Cave). She also reported three more Tsuchigumo in Naoiri county's Negino (禰疑野) field: Uchizaru (打猿), Yata (八田), and Kunimaro (国摩侶, 国麻呂). These five were described as powerful, having many allies, and refusing to obey imperial commands.
- Chikugo Province: The Nihon Shoki records that in the 3rd month of the 9th year of Emperor Chūai's reign (legendary year 200), Empress Jingū subdued a local queen named Taburatsu-hime (田油津媛) in Yamato county (山門郡, modern Yanagawa/Miyama area).
- Tango Province: The Tango no Kuni Fudoki Zanketsu, a document purported to be a fragment of the lost Tango Fudoki (though its authenticity is debated, possibly being a later forgery), mentions a Tsuchigumo named Kuga-mimi-no-Mikasa (陸耳御笠) who ravaged the land. He was supposedly defeated by Prince Hikoimasu (日子坐王), brother of Emperor Sujin, and fled to Yosa-no-Ōeyama (與佐大山), identified with modern Ōeyama. This has led some to call Kuga-mimi the "first oni of Ōeyama".

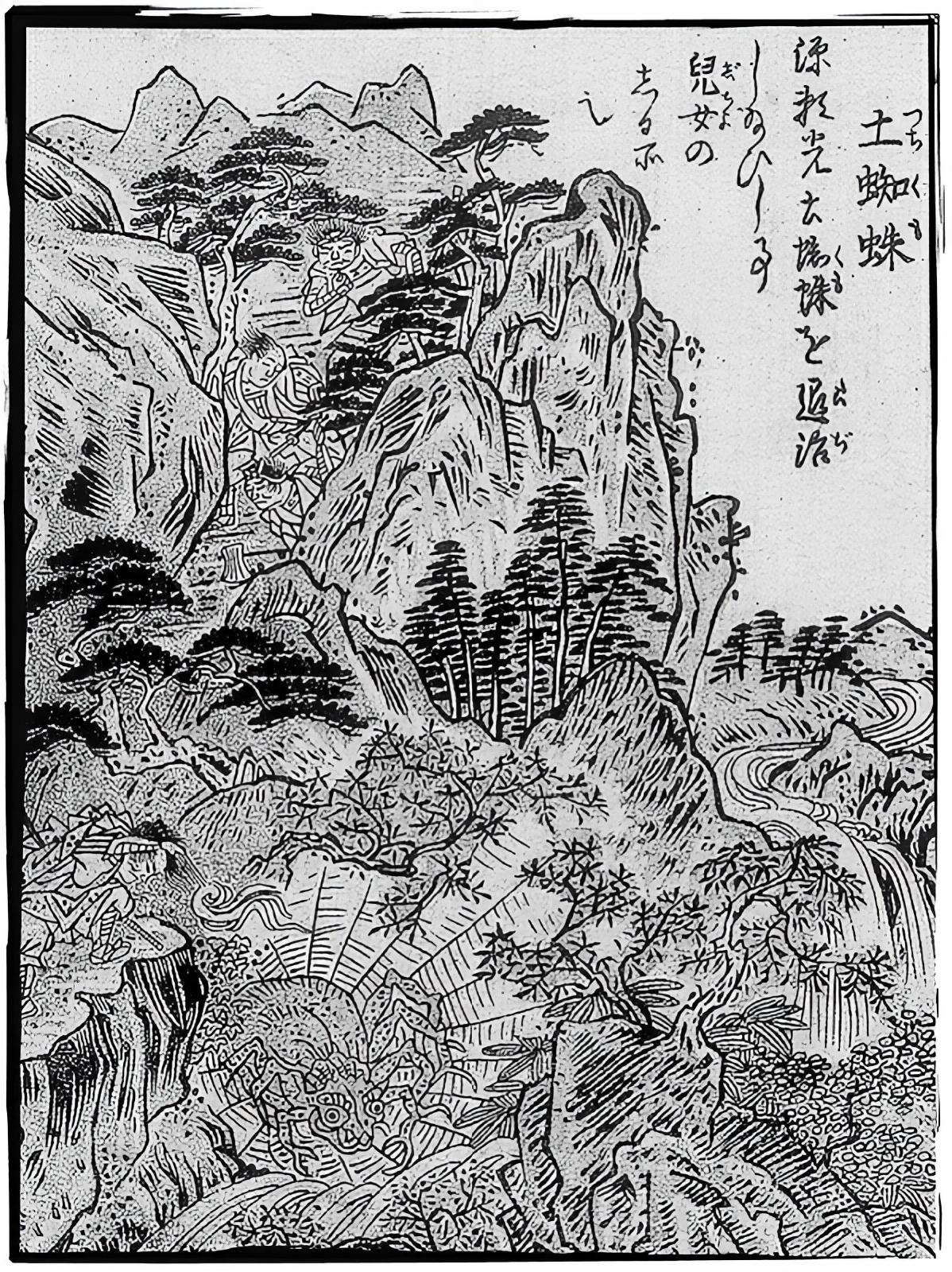
"Tsuchigumo" from the Konjaku Gazu Zoku Hyakki by Sekien Toriyama, depicted as a spider yōkai

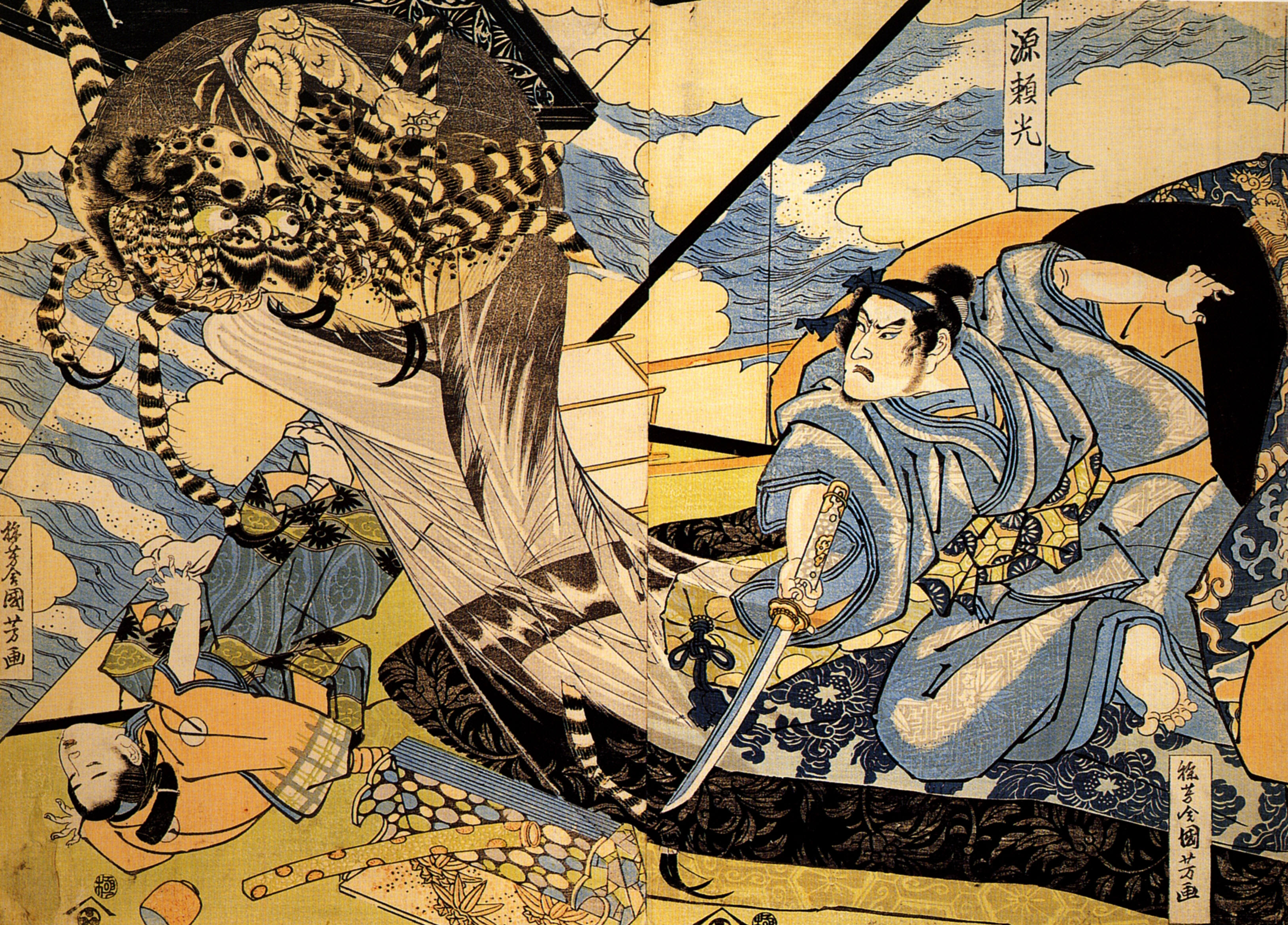
Minamoto no Yorimitsu cutting the Tsuchigumo yōkai. Woodblock print by Utagawa Kuniyoshi, early Bunsei period (c. 1818–1830). Part of a diptych.

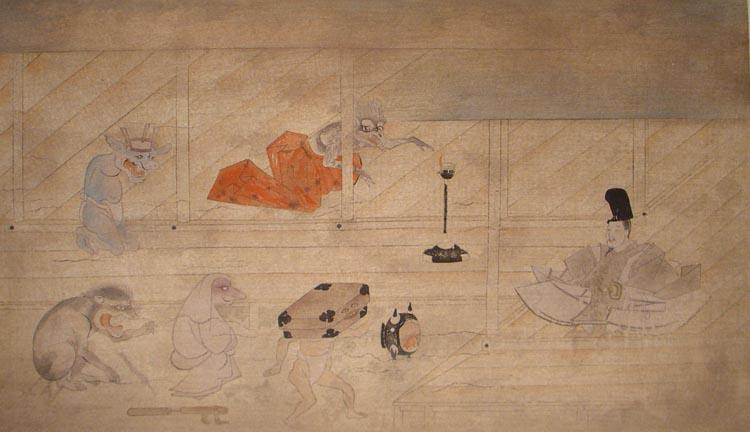
From the Tsuchigumo Sōshi, depicting strange yōkai appearing before Yorimitsu and his retainers in an old mansion

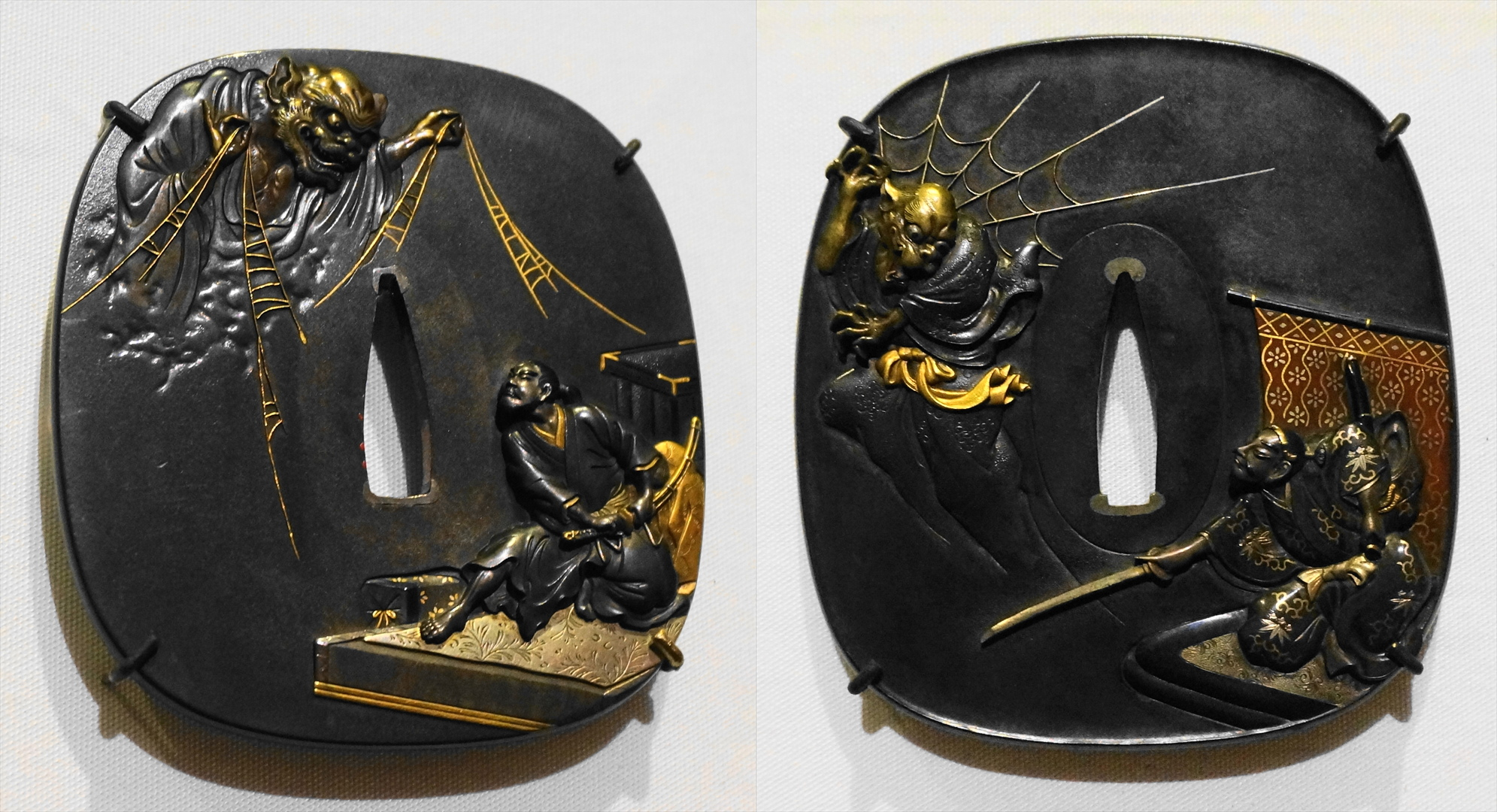
Two tsuba (sword guards) depicting Minamoto no Yorimitsu confronting the Tsuchigumo. Left: By Unno Yoshimori I. Right: By Gochiku Sadakatsu. Museum of Fine Arts, Boston.

== Yōkai Tsuchigumo ==
From the Japanese middle ages (Kamakura/Muromachi/Azuchi-Momoyama periods, or the late 12th to the early 17th centuries) onward, tsuchigumo began to be depicted as giant, monstrous spiders, often referred to as either tsuchigumo (土蜘蛛) or yamagumo (山蜘蛛, mountain spider). These depictions drew little direct inspiration from the historical accounts of rebellious clans, instead developing into distinct folklore figures.

=== The Tale of the Heike and Yorimitsu ===
A key text in popularizing the Tsuchigumo yōkai is The Tale of the Heike (Heike Monogatari). This work, passed down orally among biwa lute players, exists in numerous variants, including the expanded Genpei Jōsuiki. Some versions contain an extended passage on swords known as the "Sword Scroll" (tsurugi-no-maki). This scroll is regarded as one of the most important sources for the legend of Minamoto no Yorimitsu (also known as Raikō) and the Tsuchigumo, influencing many later artistic representations.

The Tsurugi-no-maki relates that Yorimitsu was suffering from malaria (okori) when a strange monk, seven shaku (over 2 meters) tall, appeared and tried to bind him with rope. Despite his illness, Yorimitsu slashed at the monk with his famous sword, Hizamaru. The monk fled, leaving a trail of blood. The next day, Yorimitsu, accompanied by his four chief retainers (the Shitennō), followed the blood trail to a mound behind Kitano Shrine. There they discovered a giant yamagumo, four shaku (about 1.2 meters) across. They captured the spider, impaled it with an iron skewer, and exposed it by a riverbank. Yorimitsu subsequently recovered, and Hizamaru was renamed Kumokiri (蜘蛛切; "Spider-Cutter") in honor of the event. Today, several historical tachi swords are claimed to be the legendary Hizamaru/Kumokiri, including ones held by Daikaku-ji Temple, Hakone Shrine, and a private collector. These swords also bear other names like 'Hoemaru' and 'Usumidori' based on associated legends.

=== Tsuchigumo Sōshi ===
The 14th-century picture scroll Tsuchigumo Sōshi (土蜘蛛草紙, "Tale of the Earth Spider") offers a different, more elaborate version of the legend. It depicts Yorimitsu and his retainer Watanabe no Tsuna visiting Rendaino, a burial ground north of Kyoto. They encounter a flying skull, follow it to a dilapidated mansion, and are assailed by various yōkai. Near dawn, a beautiful woman attempts to deceive them, but Yorimitsu strikes her with his sword. She vanishes, leaving a trail of white blood. Following the trail into the mountains, they discover a cave inhabited by a colossal yamagumo, described as 20 jō (approximately 60 meters) long. After a fierce battle, they slay the spider. Cutting open its belly reveals 1,990 human skulls, and numerous small spiders emerge from its flanks, along with another 20 smaller skulls. Interestingly, the scroll's illustrations sometimes deviate from the text; while the narrative describes a giant spider as the main antagonist, some images depict Yorimitsu and Tsuna battling two large oni resembling Gozu and Mezu, perhaps representing another transformation of the Tsuchigumo.

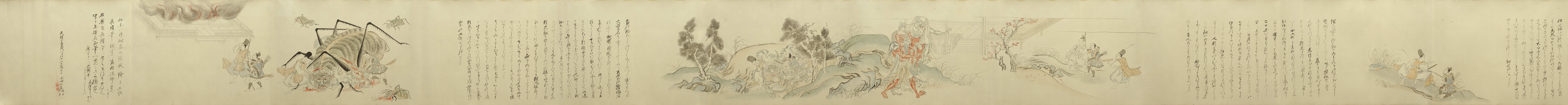
Tsuchigumo Sōshi, parts eight through thirteen, depicting Yorimitsu and Tsuna battling monstrous figures and discovering the giant spider in its cave

=== Noh, Kabuki, and later influence ===
The legend was adapted into the 15th-century Noh play Tsuchigumo. In this version, the spider spirit explicitly identifies itself, stating "I am the spirit of the Tsuchigumo who has passed many years on Mount Katsuragi" (葛城山に年を経し土蜘蛛の精魂なり). The Noh play, often categorized as a fifth-category (demon) play, solidified the image of the Tsuchigumo as a vengeful supernatural entity linked to Yorimitsu. Variations exist where Yorimitsu is incapacitated by illness, and one of his retainers hunts down the spider in his stead.

The story of Yorimitsu and the Tsuchigumo became a popular subject in Jōruri and Kabuki theatre, particularly in plays set in the "Zen-Taiheiki" world, which focused on the exploits of Yorimitsu and his Shitennō. The motif of a spider using magic influenced other tales featuring spider yōkai, such as the yamagumo in Zentō Yasukata Chūgiden (善知安方忠義伝) and Kojorōgumo (小女郎蜘蛛) in Shiraito Monogatari (白縫譚).

== Associated legends ==
Due to the popularity of the yōkai tales, several locations in Japan have legends connecting them to the Tsuchigumo:

- Mount Katsuragi, Nara: As mentioned, Katsuragi Hitokotonushi Shrine has a "Tsuchigumo mound" (土蜘蛛塚) associated with Emperor Jimmu's victory.
- Kyoto:
  - Jōbon Rendai-ji temple in Kita Ward houses a mound dedicated to Minamoto no Yorimitsu (源頼光朝臣塚), which local legend claims was originally the Tsuchigumo's nest. A story tells that someone who tried to cut down a tree near the mound fell mysteriously ill and died.
  - A mound near Ichijō-dori street in Kamigyō Ward is also said to have been a Tsuchigumo nest. A stone lantern unearthed there, dubbed the "Spider Lantern" (蜘蛛灯籠), reportedly brought misfortune to whoever possessed it. Feared as a manifestation of the Tsuchigumo's curse, it is now housed at Higashimukai Kannon-ji temple.
- Minamoto no Mitsunaka's Betrayal: One theory suggests that the persistent targeting of Yorimitsu and his retainers by yōkai like the Tsuchigumo and Shuten-dōji stems from an alleged betrayal by Yorimitsu's father, Minamoto no Mitsunaka. According to this theory, Mitsunaka initially allied with Tsuchigumo/oni forces to rebel against the Fujiwara clan but betrayed them during the Anna incident (969 AD) to save himself, thus incurring their lasting enmity upon his descendants.

== See also ==
- Jorōgumo – Another spider yōkai in Japanese folklore.
- Ryōmen Sukuna – Another figure from Japanese chronicles described as monstrous, possibly representing a rebellious force against the Yamato court.
- List of legendary creatures from Japan

Media related to Tsuchigumo at Wikimedia Commons
