= Yuki-onna Monogatari =

Japanese two-book illustrated prose narrative, likely from 16th or 17th century

Yuki-onna Monogatari (雪女物語) is a Japanese otogi-zōshi in two books (one volume), likely composed in the Azuchi-Momoyama period or the beginning of the Edo period.

== Date, genre and sources ==
Yuki-onna Monogatari is a work of the otogi-zōshi genre in two books (one volume). It was probably composed in the Azuchi-Momoyama period or the beginning of the Edo period.

It is one of a number of works depicting the defeat of a monster and the legendary origin of a famous sword, other such works including the Heike Tsurugi no Maki. This particular work portrays a marriage to a ghostly figure (怪婚 kai-kon), which is not an uncommon theme in such stories.

The work shows the influence of the yōkyoku (Noh libretti) Kokaji. In his article for the Nihon Koten Bungaku Daijiten, Motoichi Kinoshita also notes the apparent influences of setsuwa such as Izumi Shikibu Inari-mōde (和泉式部稲荷詣), Rashōmon Modori-bashi (羅生門戻橋), Tsuchi-gumo Taiji (土蜘蛛退治) and Tamamono Mae (玉藻前), as well as the Noh play Momiji-gari, on the work.

The word yuki-onna appears in the kōwakamai Fushimi Tokiwa (伏見常盤), and the motif of people being taken by old raccoons is also seen in a story in the Kokon Chomonjū.

== Plot ==
In the first year of Chōtoku (995), Emperor Ichijō is told in a dream to commission the forging of a sword by Sanjō no Kokaji Munechika (三条小鍛冶宗近). Munechika, with the assistance of the god Inari, forges the valuable blade Kogitsune-maru.

That winter, a malevolent female raccoon dog manifests as a yuki-onna and starts spiriting people away. Several warriors, including the retainers of Tada Mitsunaka, are commissioned to eliminate the beast, and manage to injure it but fail to capture it.

The following spring, Taira no Kanenobu encounters a beautiful woman on Mount Otowa and takes her home with him. Kanenobu's former lover realizes the woman's true nature and attempts to warn him, but is strangled to death. A fortune-teller tells Kanenobu that this was the work of the yuki-onna, and Kanenobu uses the sword Kogitsune-maru, with which he is entrusted by the emperor, to slay the creature.

== Textual tradition ==
In the holdings of the Katei Archives (霞亭文庫) in the University of Tokyo, there is a Shōkaiban (松会版) printed edition dating to Kanbun 5 (1665). The 1909 Kinko Shōsetsu Kaidai (近古小説解題) also reproduces a Manji 3 (1660) edition printed by Ishizu Hachirō Uemon (石津八郎右衛門).
