= Yorinobu =

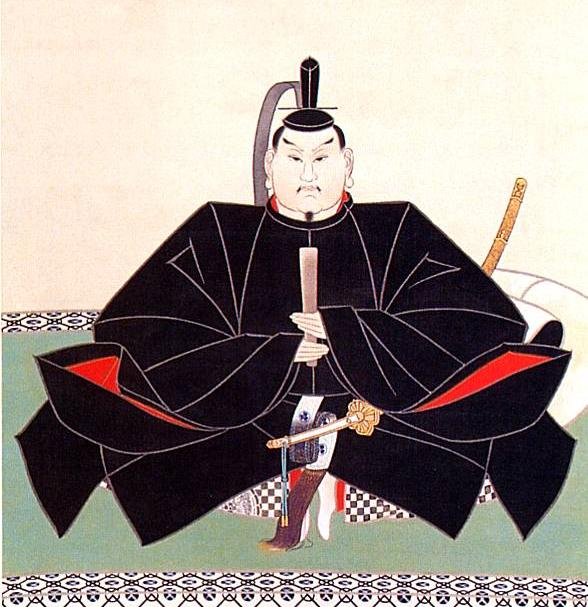
- Yorinobu Tokugawa (1602–1671), Japanese daimyō
- Pronunciation: joɾinobɯ (IPA)
- Gender: Male

Origin
- Origin: Japanese
- Meaning: Different meanings depending on the kanji used

Yorinobu is a masculine Japanese given name.

== Written forms ==
Yorinobu can be written using many different combinations of kanji characters. Here are some examples:

- 頼信, "rely, believe"
- 頼伸, "rely, extend"
- 頼延, "rely, extend"
- 頼宣, "rely, announce"
- 依信, "to depend on, believe"
- 依伸, "to depend on, extend"
- 依延, "to depend on, extend"
- 依宣, "to depend on, announce"

The name can also be written in hiragana よりのぶ or katakana ヨリノブ.

== Notable people with the name ==
- Yorinobu Minamoto (源 頼信; 968–1048), Japanese samurai
- Yorinobu Tokugawa (徳川 頼宣; 1602–1671), Japanese daimyō
