= Minamoto no Yorinobu =

Founder of the Kawachi Genji)

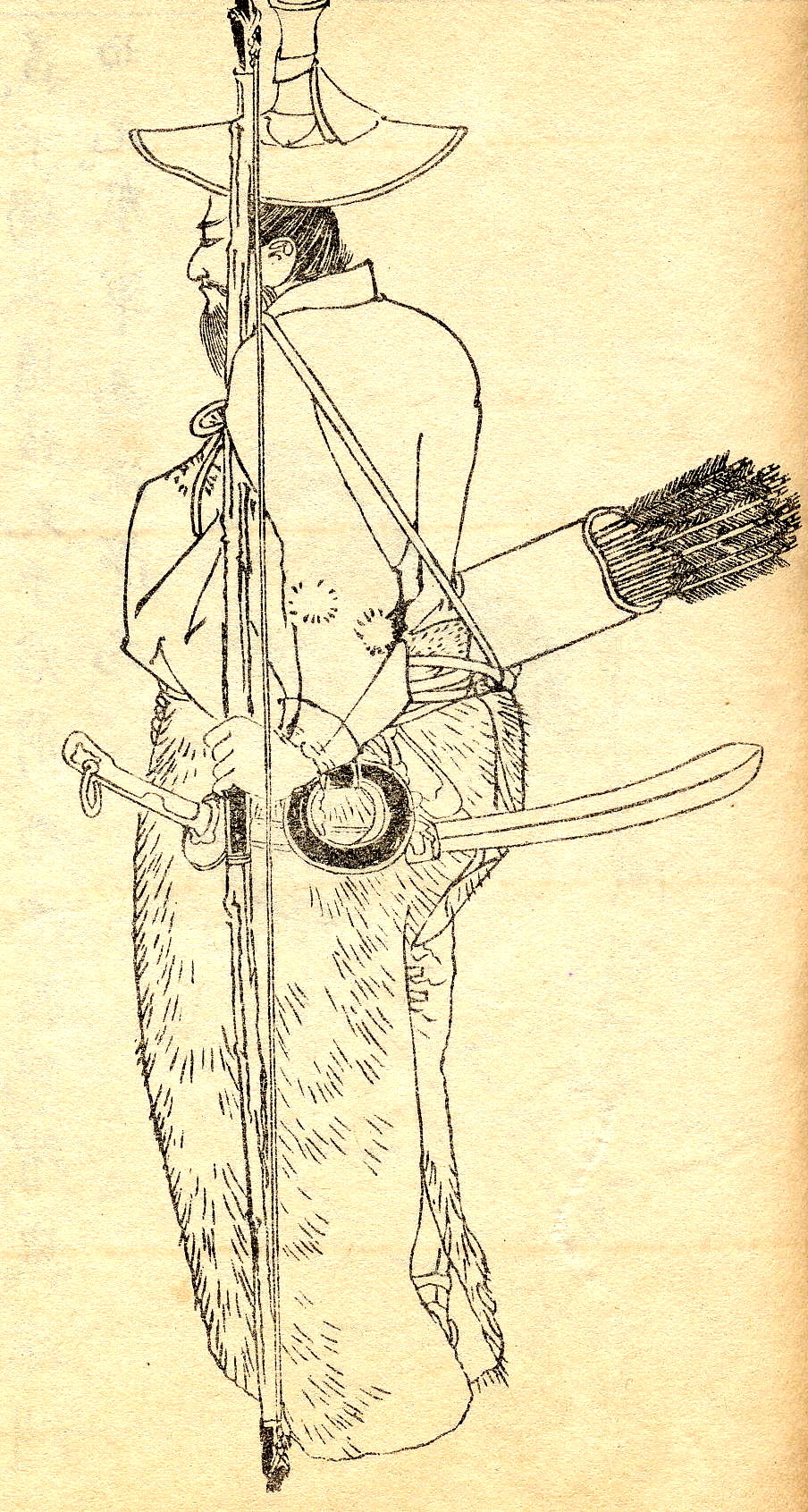
Minamoto no Yorinobu

Minamoto no Yorinobu (源 頼信; December 21, 968 – June 1, 1048) was a samurai commander and member of the powerful Minamoto clan. Along with his brother Yorimitsu, Yorinobu served the regents of the Fujiwara clan, taking the violent measures the Fujiwara were themselves unable to take. He held the title, passed down from his father, of Chinjufu-shōgun, Commander-in-chief of the Defense of the North. He served as Governor of Ise, Shinano, Sagami, Mutsu and Kai Provinces, and was the progenitor of the Kawachi Genji.

== Biography ==
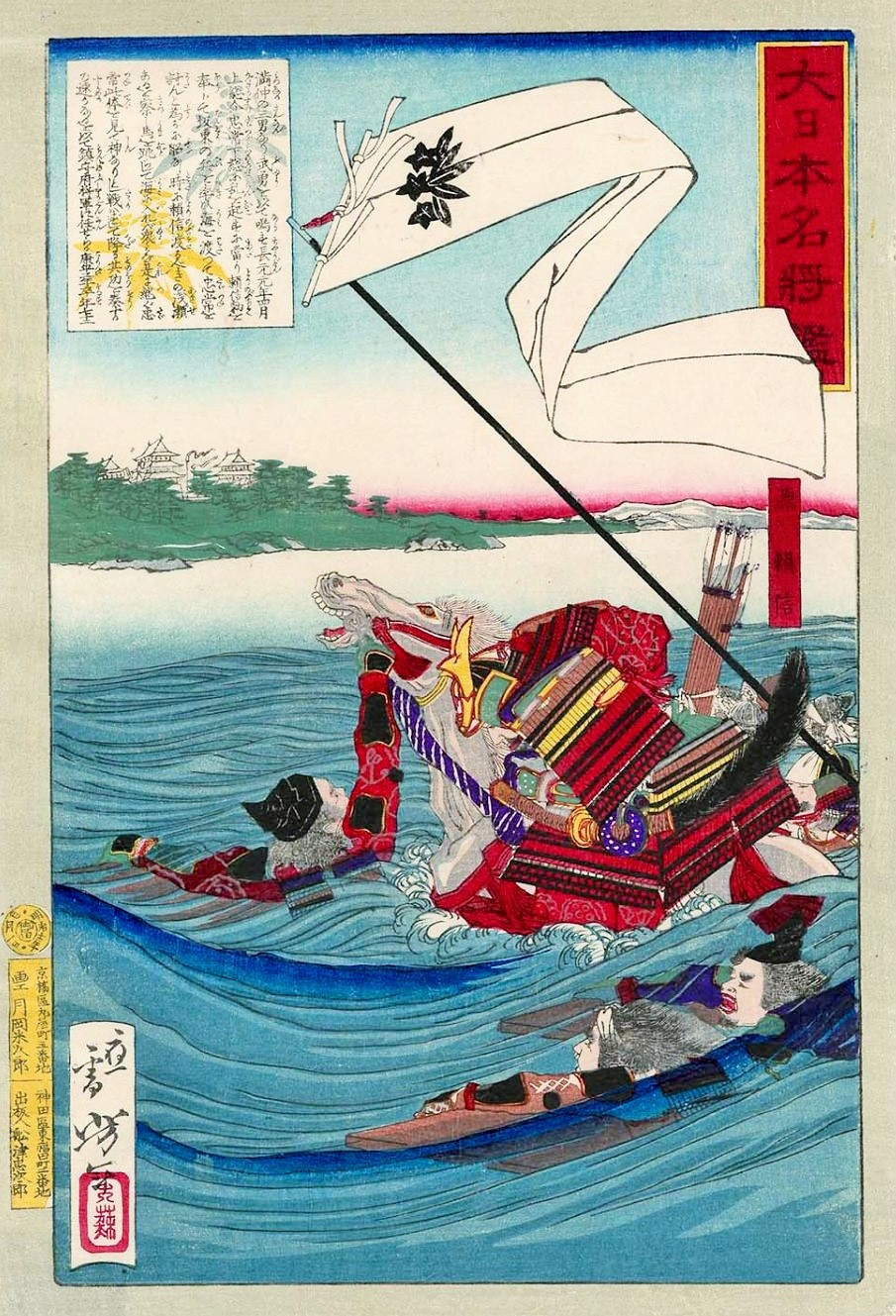
Minamoto no Yorinobu approaches the residence of Taira no Tadatsune through the inland sea.

Yorinobu was born on December 21, 968, the son of Minamoto no Mitsunaka (912–997).

Yorinobu is particularly known for being a favorite of the Regent Fujiwara no Michinaga, and for suppressing a revolt by Taira no Tadatsune, vice-governor of Kazusa Province. He had originally refused, for personal reasons, but eventually assented to taking on the charge of defeating Tadatsune, after being made Governor of Kai. While making preparations to attack, Tadatsune surrendered, offering no resistance in 1031. In putting an end to this rebellion, Yorinobu not only furthered the Court's goals and his own reputation, but he created an opening for Minamoto influence in the eastern portions of the country.

In a statement to Iwashimizu Hachiman Shrine, it was stated that the reason they were able to put down the rebellion so successfully was due to the blessing of inheriting the blood of Hachiman Daibosatsu and Emperor Ojin.

The story of the capture of Tadatsune while Yorinobu was the Governor of Kai, and other stories while he was the governor of Kōzuke Province and Hitachi Province, appear in the Konjaku Monogatarishū (vol. 25, sec. 9 and 11).

After this rebellion, the warriors of Bando (the Taira clan, the Fujiwara clan of the Hidesato lineage, etc.) began to form vassal relationships with the Kawachi Genji, laying the foundation for their later domination of the eastern provinces and for the mainstreaming of the Minamoto clan as a warrior family.

His eldest son, Minamoto no Yoriyoshi, married Taira no Naokata's daughter and inherited the power of the direct line of the Bando Taira clan who gave birth to his famous grandson Minamoto no Yoshiie. He was a part of Michinaga’s Four Heavenly Kings along with Fujiwara no Yasumasa, Taira no Korehira and Taira no Muneyori.

The tachi Tenkomaru(天光丸) is said to have been passed down from Tada Mitsunaka to Minamoto no Yorinobu and Minamoto no Yoshiie as a treasured sword of the Genji clan.

His Dharma name was Renshin (蓮心). He died on June 1, 1048.

== Family ==
- Father: Chinjufu-shōgun Minamoto no Mitsunaka
- Mother: daughter of Fujiwara no Munetada
- Wife: Shuri no Myobu
- Children: Minamoto no Yoriyoshi
- Grandchildren: Minamoto no Yoshiie
  - Minamoto no Yoshitsuna
    - Minamoto no Yoshimitsu

== See also ==
- Minamoto no Yoriyoshi
- Minamoto no Yoshiie
- Seiwa Genji
- Iwashimizu Hachimangū
- Hachiman
- Kidōmaru
