= Fujiwara no Toshihito =

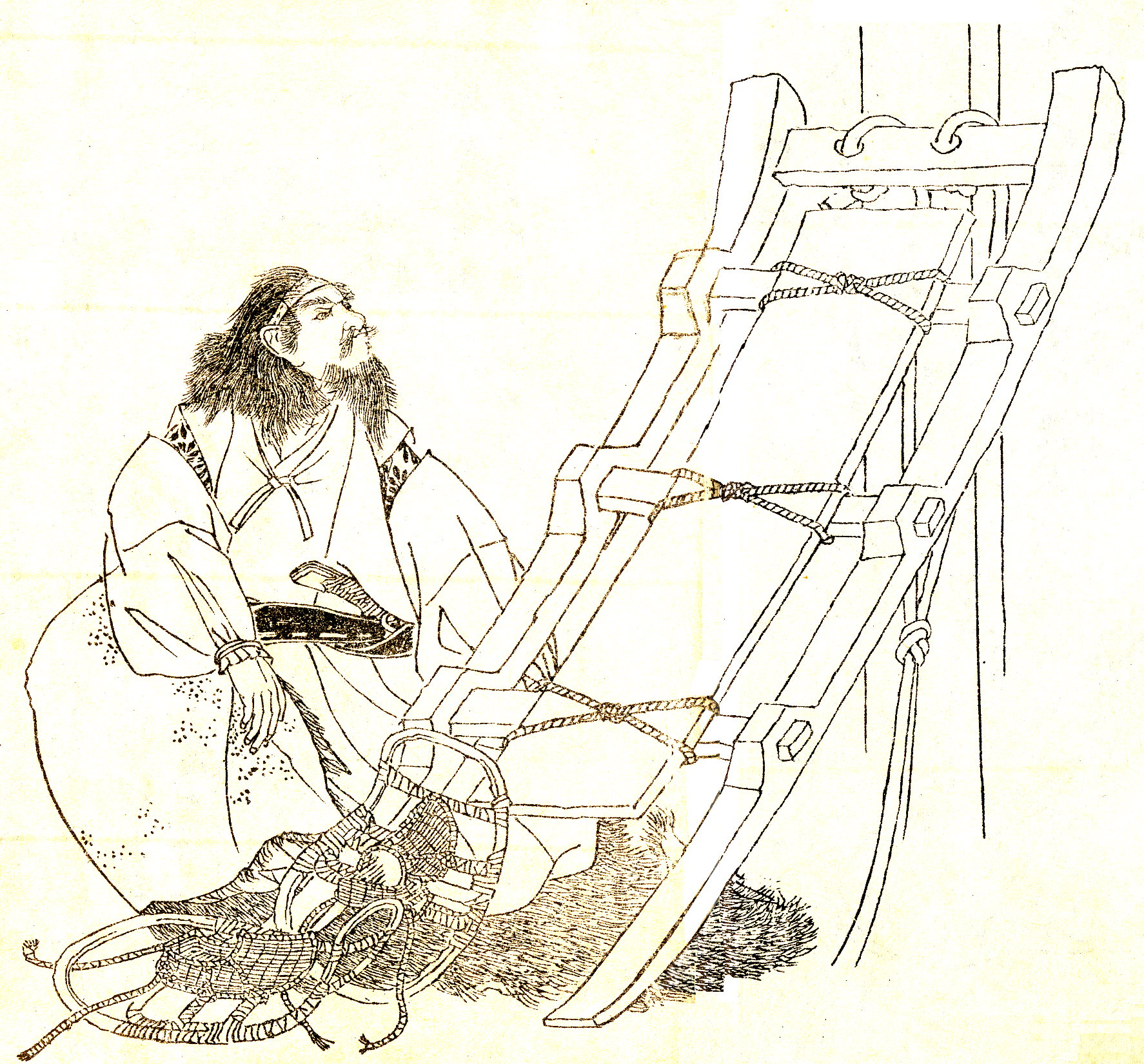
Fujiwara no Toshihito by Kikuchi Yosai

Fujiwara no Toshihito (藤原 利仁) was a noble and general during Japan's Heian period. He was the son of Fujiwara Mimbu-no-kyo Tokinaga who in turn was grandson of Fujiwara no Uona (771–778) founding father of the Northern Fujiwara.

He held the title of Chinjufu-shōgun, or Commander-in-chief of the Defense of the North. He was also father of Fujiwara Kaga-no-suke Tadayori and grandfather of Fujiwara no Yoshimune.
