= Minamoto no Yoshitsuna =

Minamoto no Yoshitsuna (源 義綱) (c. 1042 – 1134), also called Kamo Jirō (鴨 次郎), was a samurai of the Minamoto clan. He was son of Minamoto no Yoriyoshi and brother of Minamoto no Yoshiie and brother of Minamoto no Yoshimitsu.

He fought in the Former Nine Years' War along with his brother Minamoto no Yoshiie and father Minamoto no Yoriyoshi. Poor relations with older brother Yoshiie almost led to battle with the retainers surrounding Kawachi Province in May, 1091.

On August 8, 1106, Yoshitsuna's older brother Yoshiie died. Yoshiie had appointed his fourth son, Minamoto no Yoshitada, his successor. On the night of March 13, 1109, an incident occurred in which Yoshitada was attacked, and he died five days later. Yoshitsuna and son, suspected in the death of Yoshitada, fled but were captured in the mountains of Omi Province by Minamoto no Tameyoshi, and upon surrender they became priests and were banished to Sado Province. At this time, his six sons met unfortunate ends. Yoshitsuna's oldest son Minamoto no Yoshihiro and second son Minamoto no Yoshitoshi committed suicide by throwing themselves into a valley, his third son Minamoto no Yoshiaki was named the ringleader in the death of Yoshitada and died in battle while being hunted down, his fourth son Minamoto no Yoshinaka jumped into a fire and was burned to death, his fifth son Minamoto no Yoshinori did seppuku (committed suicide by disembowelment), and his sixth son Minamoto no Giko (源義公) committed suicide.

During his exile in Sado in 1132, Yoshitsuna was again hunted down by Minamoto no Tameyoshi and committed suicide. Following this it came to light that his being accused of killing Yoshitada was a false charge and that the true perpetrator was Minamoto no Yoshimitsu.
