= Heike Tsuruginomaki =

Japanese literary piece

Heike Tsuruginomaki (平家剣巻 "Heike Sword Scroll"), also called Heike Monogatari Tsuruginomaki (平家物語剣巻) is a Japanese gunki monogatari.

== Overview ==
Passed down in top secret among the biwa hōshi—blind monks who played The Tale of the Heike on the biwa lute—the scroll is meant to take place in the eleventh book of the Tale, following the chapter "The Sacred Mirror Enters the Capital" (内侍所都入) and in place typically occupied by a short chapter similarly entitled "Swords" (剣). (Note: These translations are those of Helen Craig McCullough (1988, p. 22).)

The common version of the "Swords" text collects anecdotes (setsuwa) about the sword Kusanagi, one of the imperial regalia, which had been lost at the Battle of Dannoura, and alleges that the great serpent Yamata no Orochi, slain in ages past by the storm god Susanoo no Mikoto who then retrieved the sword from the serpent's corpse, had taken the form of the boy emperor Antoku and reclaimed the sword. (This version of the text is believed to have a strong connection to Book V of the Gukanshō, which includes a passage describing Emperor Antoku as a transformed daughter of the Dragon King who had returned to her home beneath the sea.)

The expanded scroll adds further anecdotes about the prized swords of the Minamoto lineage, their virtuous power, and their names, resulting in a much larger, 120-verse text that appears in two parts, the upper and the lower (つるぎのまき・上下). Other additions include a discussion of the origins of the other two imperial regalia. These kinds of expansions led to the text being treated increasingly as an independent work from the rest of the Tale, such as in the Yashiro-bon manuscript (屋代本平家物語 Yashiro-bon Heike Monogatari), which gives Tsuruginomaki its own volume: most texts of the Tale include the shorter chapter, with the title "Swords" (剣 Tsurugi), in Book XI, but the Yashiro-bon text includes both a chapter in Book XI entitled "Regarding the Treasured Sword" (宝剣事 Hōken no Koto) and a separate Tsuruginomaki, whose contents contradict each other.

The Heike Monogatari Tsuruginomaki in the holdings of the Shōkōkan differs again from the Heike Tsuruginomaki that was included as an appendix to the Yashiro-bon text. At the end of Part 2 of the Shōkōkan text is a reference to the inheritors of two swords being the houses of Nitta and Ashikaga, which led Yamada Yoshio to theorize that it was an addition made during the time of the rivalry between these two clans. This theory would mean that the version of Tsuruginomaki that did not include this later addition must have existed by the end of the Kamakura period in the 1330s.

== Content ==
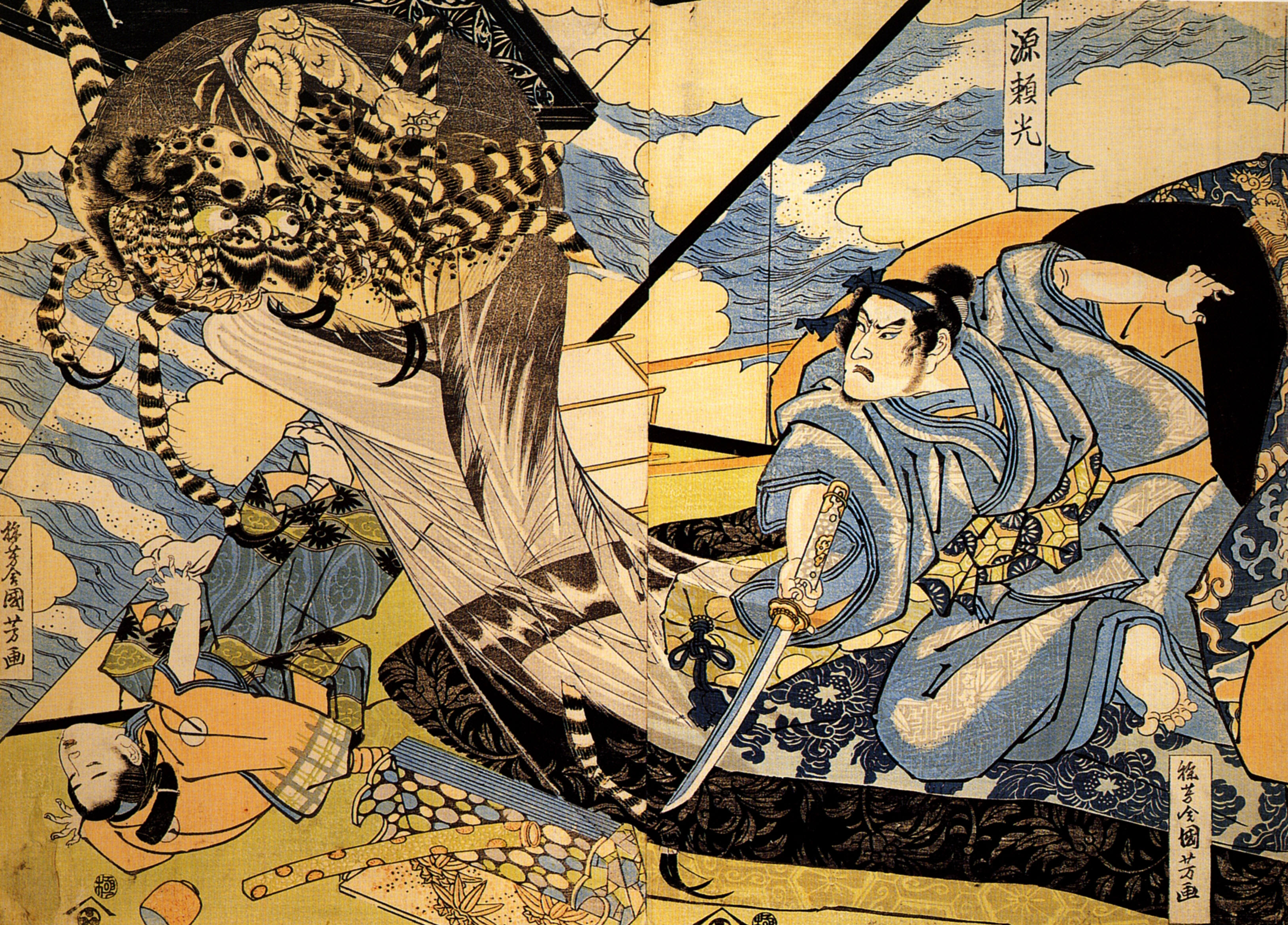
An Edo-period depiction of Yorimitsu slaying the yama-gumo, by Utagawa Kuniyoshi

Tada Mitsunaka, ancestor of the Tada branch of the Minamoto clan, at one time commissioned two swords, Higekiri ("Beard-Cutter") and Hizamaru ("Knee-maru") of a certain Chinese swordsmith. These were passed down to Mitsunaka's son Yorimitsu, who, having slain an oni (ogre) and a monstrous giant spider called a yama-gumo ("mountain spider"), renamed them Onimaru (鬼丸, "Ogre-maru") and Kumogiri (蜘蛛切, "Spider-Cutter"), respectively. (Note: Note that -maru and -giri suffixes are swapped.)

Thereafter, the swords were passed down to Yoritsuna, Yoriyoshi, and Yoshiie, who put them to good use in the Former Nine Years' War and the Later Three Years' War. During the time of Yoshiie's son Tameyoshi, Onimaru was renamed Shishinoko (獅子の子, "Lion's Child") and Kumogiri was renamed Hoemaru (吠丸, "Howl-maru"). He bequeathed Hoemaru to his son-in-law, the steward of the Kumano shrines (ja), and, after changing Shishinoko's name again to Tomogiri (友切, "Friend-Cutter"), bequeathed it to his son Yoshitomo.

Tomogiri was passed to Yoritomo following Yoshitomo's defeat in the Heiji rebellion, and Yoritomo changed its name back to Higekiri based on a revelatory dream. He deposited the sword in the Atsuta Shrine, but took it up again after receiving Prince Takakura's call to arms, and thanks to the power of this sword, he was eventually able to subdue the whole country. Hoemaru, on the other hand, had been dedicated to the god of Kumano, but passed into the hands of Minamoto no Yoshitsune, Yoritomo's younger brother, through Tanzō, the 21st steward. Renaming it Usumidori (薄緑, "Pale Green"), by the power of this sword, Yoshitsune was able wipe out the Taira clan at the Battle of Dannoura.

Of the two swords passed down since the Age of the Gods, Ame-no-Murakumo (天の村雲) and Ame-no-Haegiri (天のはえ切), Ame-no-Haegiri was stored in Furu Shrine (布留の社), but Ame-no-Murakumo, which Susanoo no Mikoto retrieved from the tail of Yamata no Orochi after slaying it, became one of the imperial regalia after being passed to Susanoo's sister, the sun goddess Amaterasu Ōmikami. Prince Yamatotakeru no Mikoto, during his subjugation of the "eastern barbarians", used this sword to cut down the long grass in order to escape from a burning field, and thereafter the sword became known as Kusanagi-no-Tsurugi, or "Grass-Cutter". However, it was lost in the ocean during the Taira's defeat at Dannoura.

Yoshitsune, seeking a reconciliation with his estranged brother Yoritomo, presented Usumidori to the god of Hakone, and the steward of Hakone (箱根別当 Hakone bettō) passed it on to Soga Gorō, and following the Soga brothers' vendetta killing (see Soga Monogatari) they presented the sword to Yoritomo in the hope of forgiveness. In this fashion did the two swords that were forged for the Minamoto clan both find their way back into the possession of their original lineage.

== Textual tradition ==
There are two other texts that, apart from their inclusion of Chinese narratives at the beginning, are clearly related to this text. One is the Tsuruginomaki (剣巻) included at the front of the Taiheiki, and the other is an illustrated printed book dating to 1653, also called Tsuruginomaki (つるぎのまき).

== Influence ==
Alongside the much earlier Nihon Shoki and the later Noh play Tsuchigumo, Heike Tsuruginomaki is an important source for the popular Japanese image of a ferocious "earth spider" known as a tsuchigumo.
