= Tsuchigumo (Noh) =

Tsuchigumo (土蜘蛛, "Earth Spider") is a Japanese Noh play. The author is unknown.

== Genre, authorship and date ==
Tsuchigumo is a Noh play. More specifically, it is classified as a genzai Noh (現在能), a relatively realistic work featuring human characters and taking place in a linear time line. It is a gobanme-mono (五番目物), meaning that the Nihyakujū-ban Utai Mokuroku (二百拾番謡目録) indicates that its author is unknown. In the modern era, it is part of the repertoires of all five of the major schools of Noh (五流現行曲).

The story takes place in the Heian period of Japanese history, depicting a popular hero of that era—specifically the late 10th and early 11th centuries—taking down a monstrous spider, but the play itself dates to the significantly later Muromachi period (14th–16th centuries).

== Sources ==
The story is derived from Heike Tsuruginomaki.

== Cast of characters ==
- Minamoto no Raikō (tsure)
- Kochō the Handmaiden (tsure)
- A yōkai in the form of a monk (mae-shite)
- A lone warrior (waki)
- The tsuchigumo spirit (nochi-shite)

== Plot ==
=== Act I ===
The famed general Minamoto no Yorimitsu, also known as Raikō, is suffering from an illness of the body and mind, and is resting at his mansion. A handmaiden, Kochō (胡蝶, "Butterfly"), arrives with medicine from the court physician, and after comforting the general, she takes her leave. Raikō's sickness grows ever worse, when a malicious spirit, or yōkai, who has taken the form of a Buddhist monk, appears, and casts a large amount of spider webbing onto Raikō. Raikō, despite his illness, reaches for the well-renowned sword beside his pillow and cuts into the monster. At this point, the monster disappears.

=== Act II ===
An image of a version of the story in which Raikō himself fights the spider.

Hearing the noise, a solitary warrior rushes to the scene. Following the blood that has spilled from the yōkai, the young warrior eventually comes to an old gravesite. A tsuchigumo, or "earth-spider", spirit appears before him, and sprays him with vast quantities of webbing, causing him tremendous pain, but he ultimately wins out and strikes the spider down.

== Themes ==
The work has a relatively direct, "realistic" plot compared with other Noh plays, and its emphasis on martial prowess was likely what earned it favour among the military class.

== Influence ==
The play provided the inspiration for numerous later works of the kabuki theatre, including the tokiwazu piece Kumo no Ito Azusa no Yumihari (蜘蛛糸梓弦) and the nagauta piece Waga Seko Koi no Aizuchi (我背子恋の合槌), which is also called Kumo no Byōshi-mai (蜘蛛の拍子舞). The latter work was first performed in 1781, and was part of a late 18th-century trend in kabuki where the actors would speak their lines while performing dances.
