= Minamoto no Mitsunaka =

Japanese courtier (912–997)

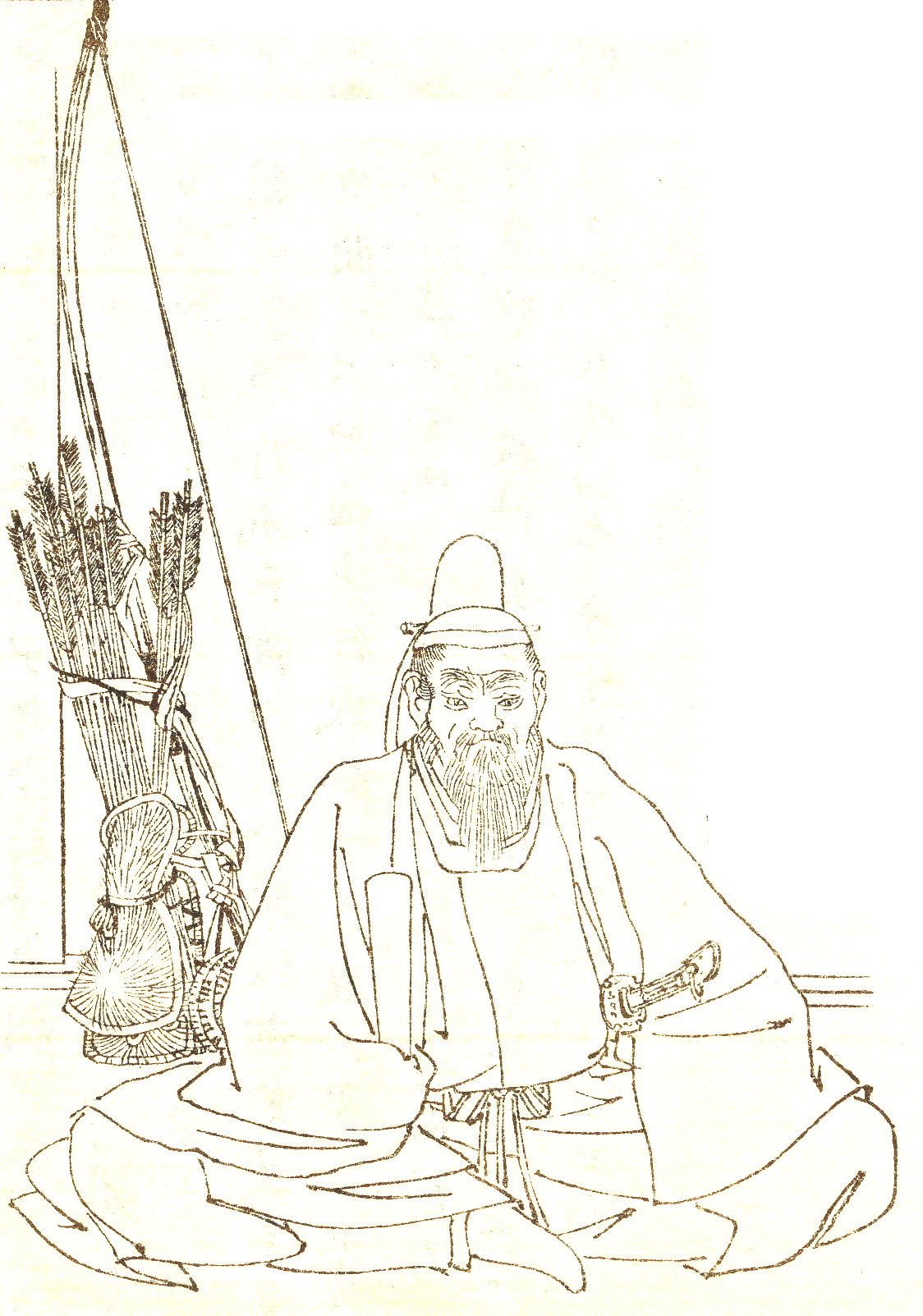
Minamoto no Mitsunaka

Minamoto no Mitsunaka (源 満仲; April 29, 912 – October 6, 997) was a Japanese samurai and court official of the Heian period. He served as Chinjufu-shōgun and acting governor of Settsu Province. His association with the Fujiwara clan made him one of the wealthiest and most powerful courtiers of his day.

== Biography ==
He was born on April 29, 912, as Myoomaru (明王丸), the son of Minamoto no Tsunemoto. He belonged to the Seiwa Genji branch of the Minamoto clan, which traced its ancestry to Emperor Seiwa.

He loyally (if not selflessly) served several successive Fujiwara regents (sessho and kampaku) beginning with Fujiwara no Morotada. There is debate among scholars as to his involvement in the Anna Plot of 969 (named for the era it took place in). All agree that Mitsunaka alleged that Minamoto no Takaakira was plotting against the Emperor. However, whilst some believe that there was a genuine threat to the Emperor, and that it was Mitsunaka's warning that prevented the plot from succeeding, others view the incident as one manufactured for political gain. Takaakira was Morotada's principal rival, and his being implicated in the plot removed him as a threat; the truthfulness of the accusations levelled against Takaakira is not known. In any case, the negative consequences for Takaakira put Mitsunaka firmly in Morotada's good graces. Later, Mitsunaka would assist Fujiwara no Kaneie in his plot to coerce Emperor Kazan into taking Buddhist vows and abdicating in favor of Fujiwara's seven-year-old grandson.

Mitsunaka's association with the Fujiwara clan made him one of the wealthiest and most powerful courtiers of his day. He served as the acting governor (kokushi) of ten provinces, most notably Settsu, which became the mainstay of his military and economic power. In addition, Mitsunaka inherited his father's title of Chinjufu-shōgun, Commander-in-chief of the Defense of the North. The patron/client relationship between the Fujiwara and the Seiwa Genji continued for nearly two hundred years after Mitsunaka's death; indeed, the Seiwa Genji came to be known as the "teeth and claws" of the Fujiwara.

Mitsunaka married the daughter of Minamoto no Suguru, from the Saga Genji branch of the Minamoto. He was the father of three sons: Minamoto no Yorimitsu (who became the hero of a large body of folklore), Minamoto no Yorinobu, and Minamoto no Yorichika.

"He had many sons, all of them accomplished in the way of the warrior, except one who was a monk. His name was Genken." This monk of the Tendai Sect, with the aid of Genshin, was able to convert his father to Buddhism. Upon his conversion, Minamoto no Mitsunaka built a hall to atone for his sins. "What is known as Tada Temple is a cluster of halls that began to be built with this one."

In his later years, Mitsunaka retired to his manor in Tada, a town in Settsu province; for this reason, he is also known as Tada Manjū. (Manjū is the Sino-Japanese reading of the characters for "Mitsunaka"). His descendants are sometimes referred to as the "Settsu Genji" or the "Tada Genji".

In 987, along with 16 vassals and 30 court ladies, Mitsunaka ordained as a Buddhist monk and received the Dharma name Mankei (満慶).

== Legends ==
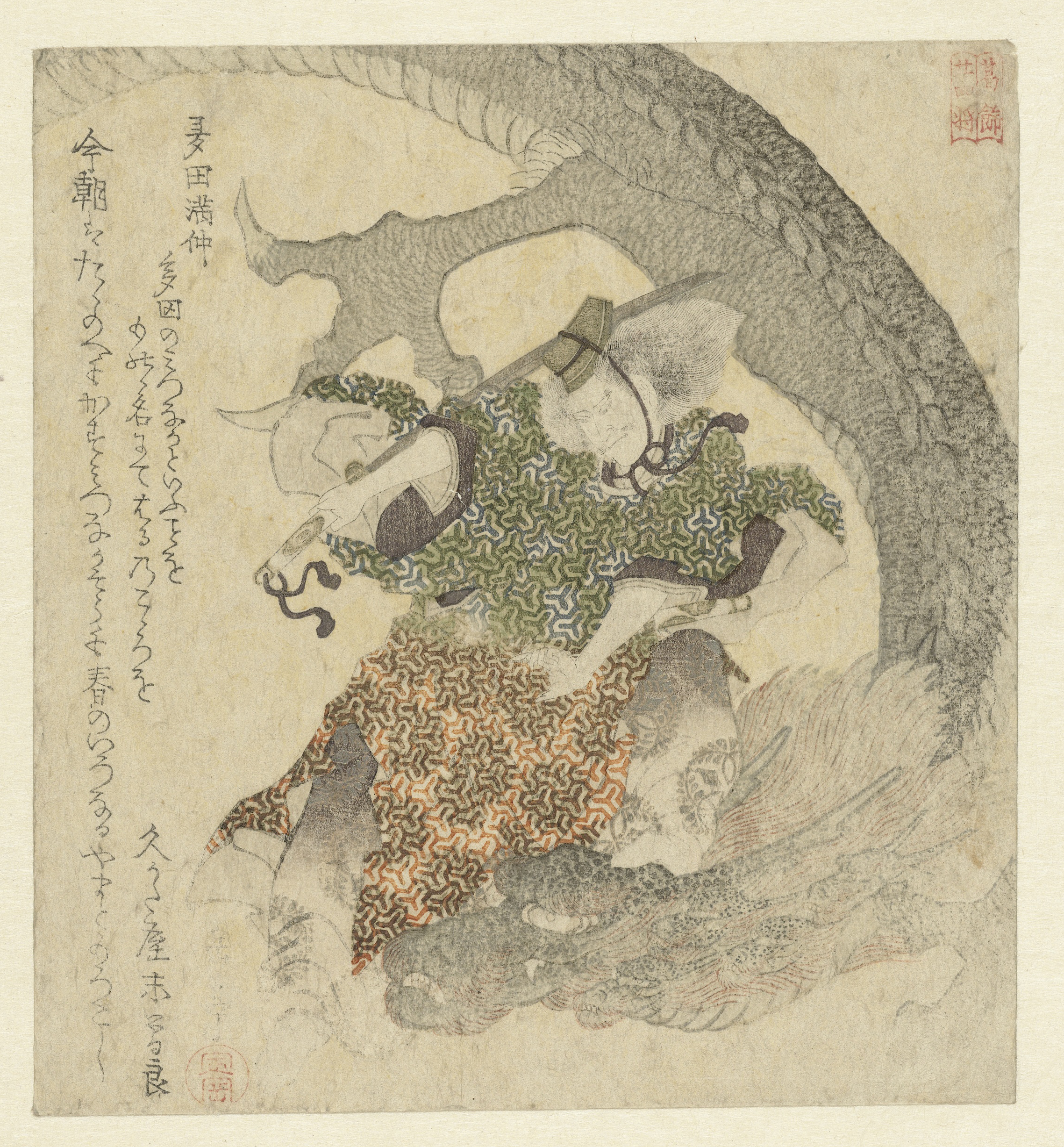
Tada no Mitsunaka slaying the dragon

A story about the samurai Minamoto no Mitsunaka tells that, while he was hunting in his own territory of Settsu, he dreamt under a tree and had a dream in which a beautiful woman named Longnü appeared to him and begged him to save her land from a giant serpent which was defiling it. Mitsunaka agreed to help and the maiden gave him a magnificent horse. When he woke up, the seahorse was standing before him. He rode it to the Sumiyoshi temple, where he prayed for eight days. Then he confronted the serpent and slew it with an arrow.

== In popular culture ==
Mitsunaka appears in the anime Otogi Zoshi, along with fictionalized versions of a number of other historical figures.

== Family ==
- Father: Chinjufu-shōgun Minamoto no Tsunemoto
- Mother: daughter of Tachibana no Shigefuru or daughter of Fujiwara no Toshiyuki
- Children:
  - Minamoto no Yorimitsu
  - Minamoto no Yorinobu
  - Minamoto no Yorichika

== See also ==
- Yuki-onna Monogatari
- Heike Tsuruginomaki
