= Chinjufu shōgun =

Military post in classical and feudal Japan

The chinjufu shōgun (鎮守府将軍, literally, “commander-in-chief of the central peacekeeping headquarters”), also translated loosely as “commander-in-chief of the defense of the north”, was a military post in classical and feudal Japan. Under the command of the seii taishōgun, the chinjufu shōgun was primarily responsible for the pacification of the Ezo people of northern Honshū and Hokkaidō, and Japan's defense against them.

The post was originally created during the Nara period. A military district, called chinjufu (鎮守府) was established as the chinjufu shōgun's area of authority. It was originally located in the fortress of Tagajō in what is now Miyagi Prefecture. However, it was moved further north in 801, after the chinjufu shōgun at the time, Sakanoue no Tamuramaro achieved a series of victories against the natives, pushing them further north. Once all of Honshū was conquered, or pacified, by the Japanese, the new base at Isawa came to be controlled by the various samurai clans of that region. The castle, along with the chinjufu military district and the position of chinjufu shōgun, was abandoned in the early 14th century.

== Notable chinjufu shōgun ==
- Ōno no Azumabito (大野東人, d. 742)
- Ōtomo no Komaro (大伴古麻呂, d. 757)
- Fujiwara no Asakari (藤原朝狩, d. 764)
- Tanaka no Ōtamaro (田中多太麻呂, appointed 769)
- Ishikawa no Natari (石川名足, 728–788)
- Sakanoue no Karitamaro (坂上苅田麿, 728–786)
- Saeki no Mino (佐伯三野, d. 779)
- Ōtomo no Surugamaro (大伴駿河麻呂, d. 776)
- Ki no Hirozumi (紀廣純, appointed 777)
- Ōtomo no Yakamochi (大伴家持, 718–785)
- Kudara no Konikishi Shuntetsu (百済王俊哲, appointed 787, reappointed 798)
- Tajihi no Umi (多治比宇美, appointed 787)
- Sakanoue no Tamuramaro (坂上田村麻呂, 758–811)
- Saeki no Mimimaro (佐伯耳麻呂, appointed 809)
- Mononobe no Taritsugu (物部足継, appointed 812)
- Mononobe no Kumai (物部熊猪, appointed 834)
- Sakanoue no Masamichi (坂上当道, appointed 859)
- Ono no Harukaze (小野春風, appointed 878)
- Abe no Mitora (安倍三寅, appointed 884)
- Fujiwara no Toshihito (藤原利仁, appointed 915)
- Fujiwara no Toshiyuki (藤原利行)
- Taira no Kunika (平国香, d. 935)
- Taira no Yoshikane (平良兼, d. 939)
- Taira no Yoshimasa (平良将)
- Fujiwara no Hidesato (藤原秀郷, 10th century)
- Taira no Yoshimochi (平良持, d. 935)
- Taira no Sadamori (平貞盛, d. 989)
- Minamoto no Tsunemoto (源經基, 894–961)
- Minamoto no Mitsunaka (源満仲, 912–997)
- Minamoto no Yorinobu (源頼信, 968–1048)
- Abe no Yoritoki (安倍頼時, c. 1050)
- Minamoto no Yoriyoshi (源頼義, 998–1082)
- Minamoto no Yoshiie (源義家, 1039–1106)
- Fujiwara no Hidehira (藤原秀衡, c. 1122–1187)
- Minamoto no Yoshishige (源義重, 1135–1202)
- Kitabatake Akiie (北畠顕家, 1318–1338)
- Ashikaga Takauji (足利尊氏, 1305–1358)
- Ashikaga Tadayoshi (足利直義, 1306–1352)

== See also ==
- Frederic, Louis (2002). "Japan Encyclopedia." Cambridge, Massachusetts: Harvard University Press.
- "Chinjufu" was also the name of a naval station (depot), an admiralty port. During the Meiji era, of the naval bases at Sasebo, Maizuru, and Yokosuka.
- "Chinju" or "chinju no kami" - a local (tutelary) deity, a guardian god, a tutelary god protecting a specific geographical area. "Chinju no kami" are found in imperial residences, large mansions, Buddhist temples, and in the territories and castles of aristocratic families. They have come gradually to be worshipped as "ujigami" or "ubusuna no kami"

== Bibliography ==
- Adolphson, Mikael; Edward Kamens, Stacie Matsumoto (2007). Heian Japan: Centers and Peripheries. University of Hawaii Press. ISBN 0-8248-3013-X.
