= Minamoto no Yoriyoshi =

Japanese military personnel

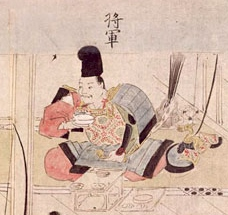
Minamoto no Yoriyoshi

Minamoto no Yoriyoshi (源 頼義; 988 – August 27, 1075) was a Japanese samurai lord who was the head of the Minamoto clan and served as Chinjufu-shōgun. Along with his son Minamoto no Yoshiie, he led the Imperial forces against rebellious forces in the north, a campaign called the Zenkunen War, which would be followed some years later by the Gosannen War.

== Biography ==
His childhood name was Odaimaru (王代丸). He held the title, passed down from his father, of Chinjufu-shōgun, Commander-in-chief of the Defense of the North.

Yoriyoshi accompanied his father Minamoto no Yorinobu on his own missions to defend the Empire, quelling rebellions and disturbances. Thus he gained much of his knowledge of tactics and strategy. He fought in the Zenkunen War for twelve years starting in 1051, including the Battle of Kawasaki. In 1063, Yoriyoshi founded Tsurugaoka Hachiman-gū in Kamakura which was to become, roughly a century later, the primary shrine of the Minamoto clan when they began the Kamakura shogunate.

His son was Minamoto no Yoshiie, who "would go on to be admired by his contemporaries as the greatest warrior."

In 1065, he ordained as a Buddhist monk and received the Dharma name Shinkai (信海).

== Family ==
- Father: Chinjufu-shōgun Minamoto no Yorinobu
- Mother: Shuri no Myobu
- Wife: daughter of Taira no Naokata
- Children:
  - Minamoto no Yoshiie
  - Minamoto no Yoshitsuna
  - Minamoto no Yoshimitsu

== See also ==
- Iwashimizu Hachimangū
- Hachiman

== Sources ==
- Sansom, George (1958). 'A History of Japan to 1334'. Stanford, California: Stanford University Press.
