= Shirotoridate ruins =

Heian and Kamakura period settlement in Ōshū, Japan

- 白鳥舘遺跡 (Japanese)
- Shirotoridate Shirotoridate ruins (Japan)
- 39°01′26.23″N 141°08′01.84″E
- Type: ruined settlement
- Periods: Heian period
- Location: Ōshū, Iwate, Japan
- Region: Tōhoku region

Site notes
- Elevation: 22 m (72 ft)
- Condition: ruins
- Public access: Yes

Shirotoridate ruins (白鳥舘遺跡, Shirotoridate iseki) was a late Heian period and Kamakura period settlement in what is now part of the city of Ōshū, Iwate Prefecture, Japan. It is protected by the central government as a National Historic Site.

== Overview ==
In what is now the city of Ōshū, the Kitakami River makes a 180 degree bend. This was a naturally defensive location, and the 8th son of Abe no Yoritoki built a fortified settlement at this location towards the end of the Heian period. This was destroyed by the Minamoto clan during the Former Nine Years' War of 1051 to 1063. At the time of the Gosannen War (1083-1089), Fujiwara no Kiyohira occupied this location and built a palace.

As a result of archaeological excavations in 2003 and 2017, it was confirmed that this location was fortified with a moat and earthen rampart, and had a pier and a crafts production area. It appeared to be both a center for riverine traffic on the Kitakami River, but also a manufacturing location supporting the Northern Fujiwara capital of Hiraizumi. A number of crystal beads (1.8 cm in diameter) that closely resembles the beads on statues at the temple of Chuson-ji were found, along with many Chinese and domestic ceramics shards and broken roof tiles. The remains of a blacksmith's forge were also found. A porcelain kiln remained functioning at this location into the Kamakura periods and a village existed until the Edo Period.

The site received protection as a National Historic Site in 1997, together with the Yanagi-no-Gosho ruins in Hiraizumi and the Chōjagahara temple ruins in Ōshū.

It was included in the original 2006 nomination of "Hiraizumi - Cultural Landscape Associated with Pure Land Buddhist Cosmology". However, it was removed from the nomination after the failure to secure inscription in 2008, although there are continuing efforts to secure its inclusion through future extension.

The site is about 3 kilometers southeast of Maesawa Station on JR East.

== See also ==
- List of Historic Sites of Japan (Iwate)
