= Yanagi-no-Gosho =

Yanagi-no-gosho ruins
- 柳之御所遺跡 (Japanese)
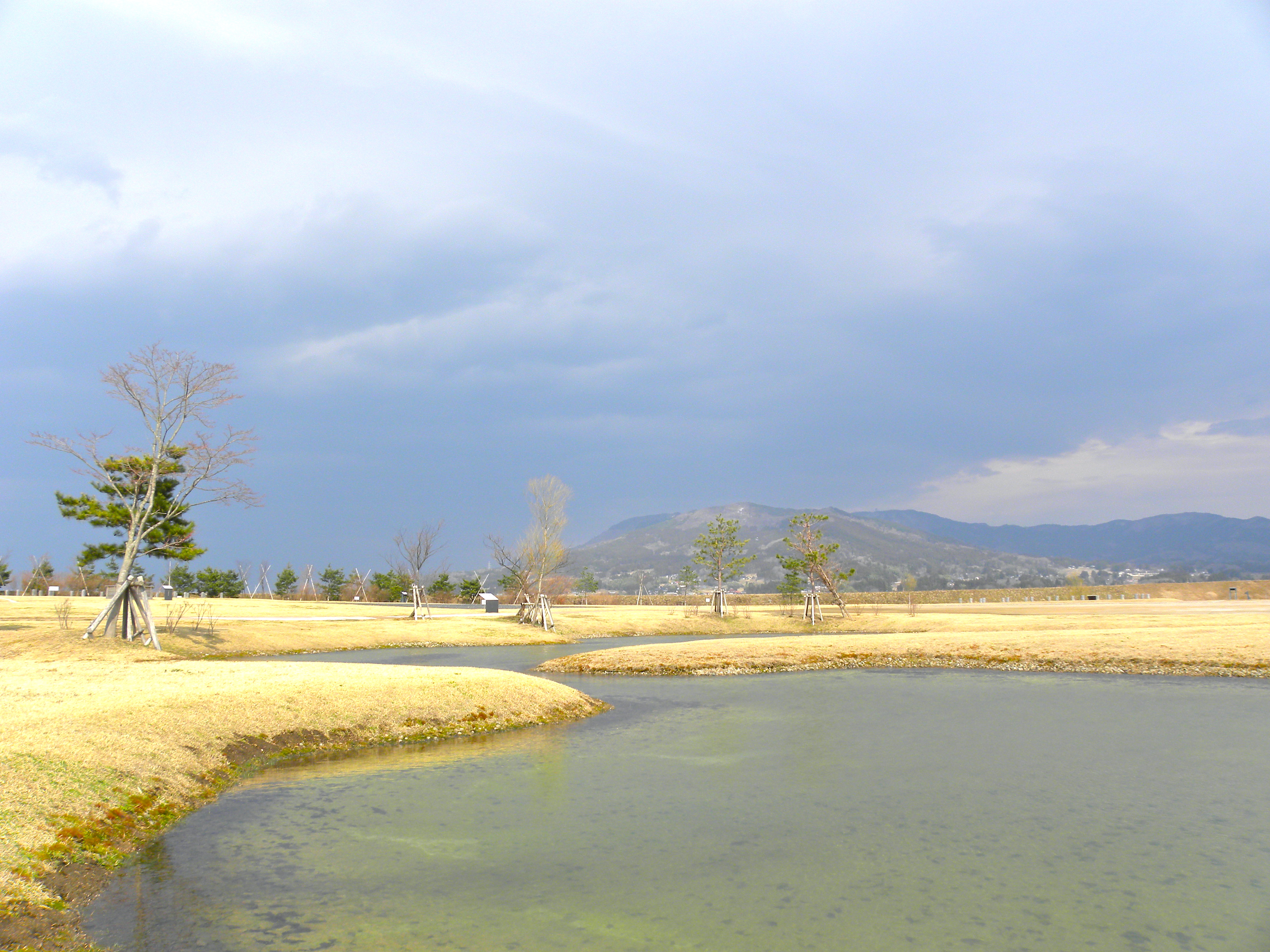
- Site of the Yanagi-no-Gosho

- Yanagi-no-gosho Yanagi-no-Gosho (Japan)
- 38°59′37″N 141°07′09″E
- Type: ruined palace
- Periods: Heian period
- Location: Hiraizumi, Iwate, Japan
- Region: Tōhoku region

History
- Built: 1090-1100 AD
- Abandoned: 1189 AD

Site notes
- Elevation: 270 m (890 ft)
- Excavation dates: 1988-1996
- Discovered: 1969
- Condition: ruins
- Public access: Yes (archaeological park)

The Yanagi Palace (柳之御所, Yanagi-no-gosho) was the late Heian period palace complex of the Northern Fujiwara clan, the rulers of Hiraizumi, in what is now southern Iwate Prefecture, Japan. It is protected by the central government as a National Historic Site.

== Overview ==
Victorious in the Gosannen War, Fujiwara no Kiyohira relocated his seat from Iwayadō Castle, in present-day Esashi Ward, Ōshū City, Iwate prefecture, to a new location on Mount Kanzan in what is now Hiraizumi, sometime between the year 1090 to 1100 AD. There appear to be three main reasons for his choice of site. First was its location directly on the Ōshū Kaidō, the main highway leading south to the capital and other major cities and north to the lands he controlled. Secondly it was determined to be the center of his realm, as measured from the Shirakawa Barrier in the south to Sotogahama in present-day Aomori Prefecture in the north. Thirdly the location is on the south side of the Koromo River, in what had traditionally been Japanese (as opposed to Emishi) territory.

The palace was used by his son Fujiwara no Motohira, grandson Fujiwara no Hidehira and great-grandson Fujiwara no Yasuhira. However, the palace was burned to the ground in 1189, when Minamoto no Yoritomo destroyed the North Fujiwara clan. The name "Yanagi-no-gosho" is not contemporary and appears to have been derived from the legend of Minamoto no Yoshitsune during the Muromachi period. In the Azuma Kagami, the palace is referred to as simply the "Hiraizumikan" (Hiraizumi residence).

The site was lost for many years and there was speculation that it had been swept away by changes in the course of the Kitakami River over the centuries. However, from 1969, excavations confirmed the location and a detailed survey was conducted over six years from 1988. The palace site has a length of 725 meters and maximum width of 212 meters, and is bordered by the Kitami River to the east and the Nekomagafuchi River to the west. The two rivers are joined by moats, and the center section of the palace was protected by a wooden palisade. Excavated artifacts were abundant, and include Chinese white porcelain vases, large Tokoname ceramic pots, various wooden artifacts and earthenware dishes. The foundations of several buildings and the outlines of what was once pond in the gardens were uncovered.

The area received protection as a National Historic Site in 1997, together with two sites in the city of Ōshū, Iwate; the Shirotoridate ruins and the Chōjagahara temple ruins.

It was included in the original 2006 nomination of "Hiraizumi - Cultural Landscape Associated with Pure Land Buddhist Cosmology". However, it was removed from the nomination after the failure to secure inscription in 2008, although there are continuing efforts to secure its inclusion through future extension.

The site was opened as a park in April 2010, with many of the artifacts discovered on display at the Yanagi-no-Gosho Museum at site.

== See also ==
- List of Historic Sites of Japan (Iwate)
