= Abe no Munetō =

Samurai of the Abe clan of Japan

Abe no Munetō 安倍宗任
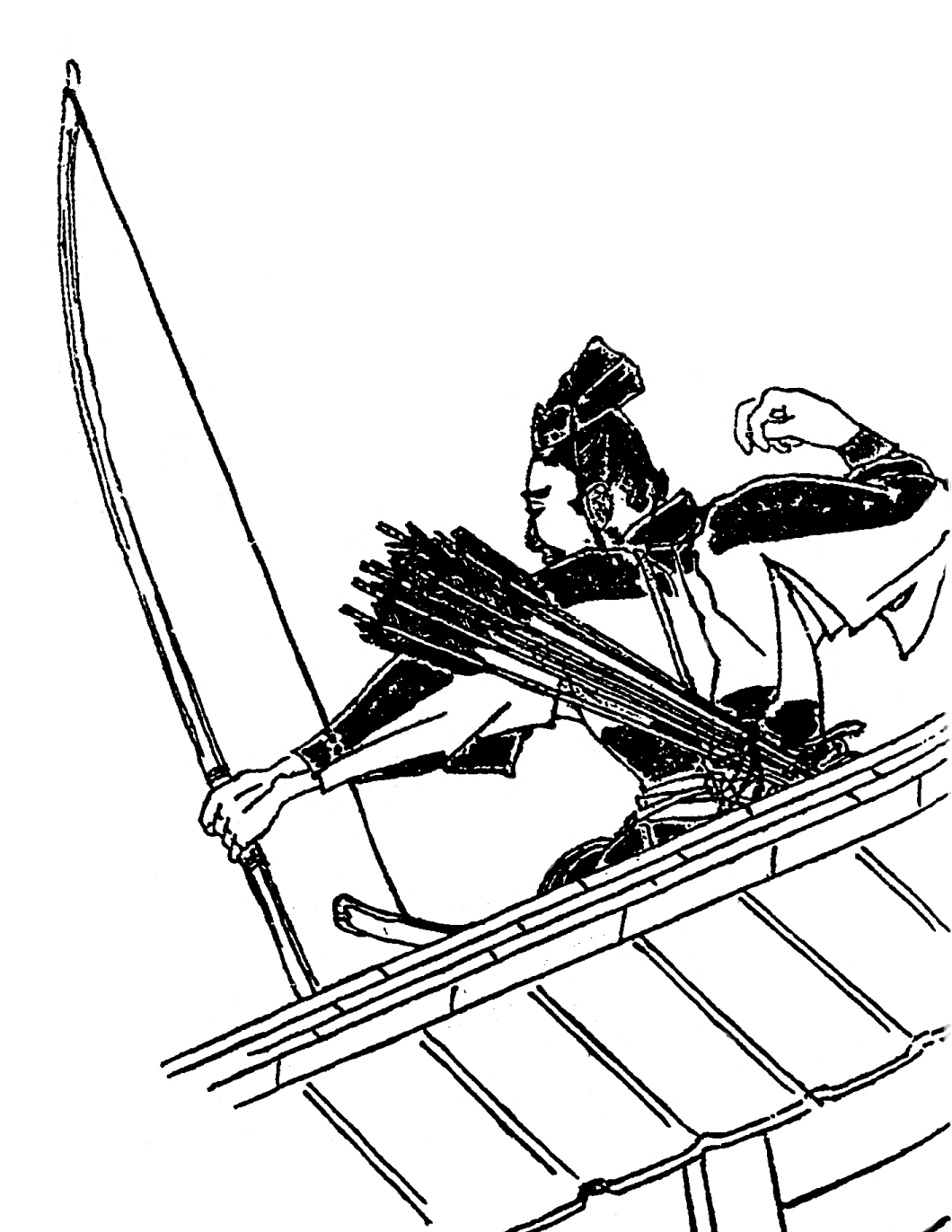
- Born: 1032
- Died: 1108 (aged 75–76)
- Relatives: Father: Abe no Yoritoki, Brothers: Abe no Sadato (1019–1062), Abe no Masato and Abe no Norito Child: Muneyoshi
- Military career
- Allegiance: Abe clan

Abe no Munetō (安倍 宗任; 1032 – March 18, 1108) was a samurai of the Abe clan during the Heian period of Japan. He was the son of Abe no Yoritoki, the head of the Abe clan of Emishi who were allowed to rule the six Emishi districts in the Kitakami Basin from Morioka to Hiraizumi in what is now Iwate Prefecture. Abe no Yoritoki was the Chinjufu-shōgun (general in charge of overseeing the Ainu and the defense of the north). In the Zenkunen War, he fought, together with his brother Sadato, alongside his father against the Minamoto.

Abe no Munetō was based at the Isawa Stockade. He occupied the fort called the Tonomi Palisade (鳥海冊, tonomi-saku) that was established on the north side of the Isawa at an uncertain date. In 1061, during the Zenkunen War, Abe no Munetō defeated the Minamoto forces in the Battle of Tonomi Palisade.

== Siblings ==
- Abe no Sadato (1019–1062) who occupied the Kuriyagawa Stockade;
- Abe no Masato who occupied the Kurosawa Stockade;
- Abe no Norito who stayed at the Koromo Stockade with his father;
- a sister who married Taira no Nagahira;
- a sister who married Fujiwara no Tsunekiyo. Through her his father Yoritoki became the grandfather of Fujiwara no Kiyohira, the founder of the Northern Fujiwara dynasty.
