= Minamoto no Yoshiie =

Leader of the Kawachi Genji (1039–1106)

- Minamoto no Yoshiie (middle)
- Born: c. 1039
- Died: 4 August 1106 (aged 66–67)
- Native name: 源 義家
- Other names: Hachimantarō Yoshiie (八幡太郎義家) Most Valorous Warrior in the Land (天下第一武勇之士)
- Nationality: Japanese
- Team: Minamoto clan

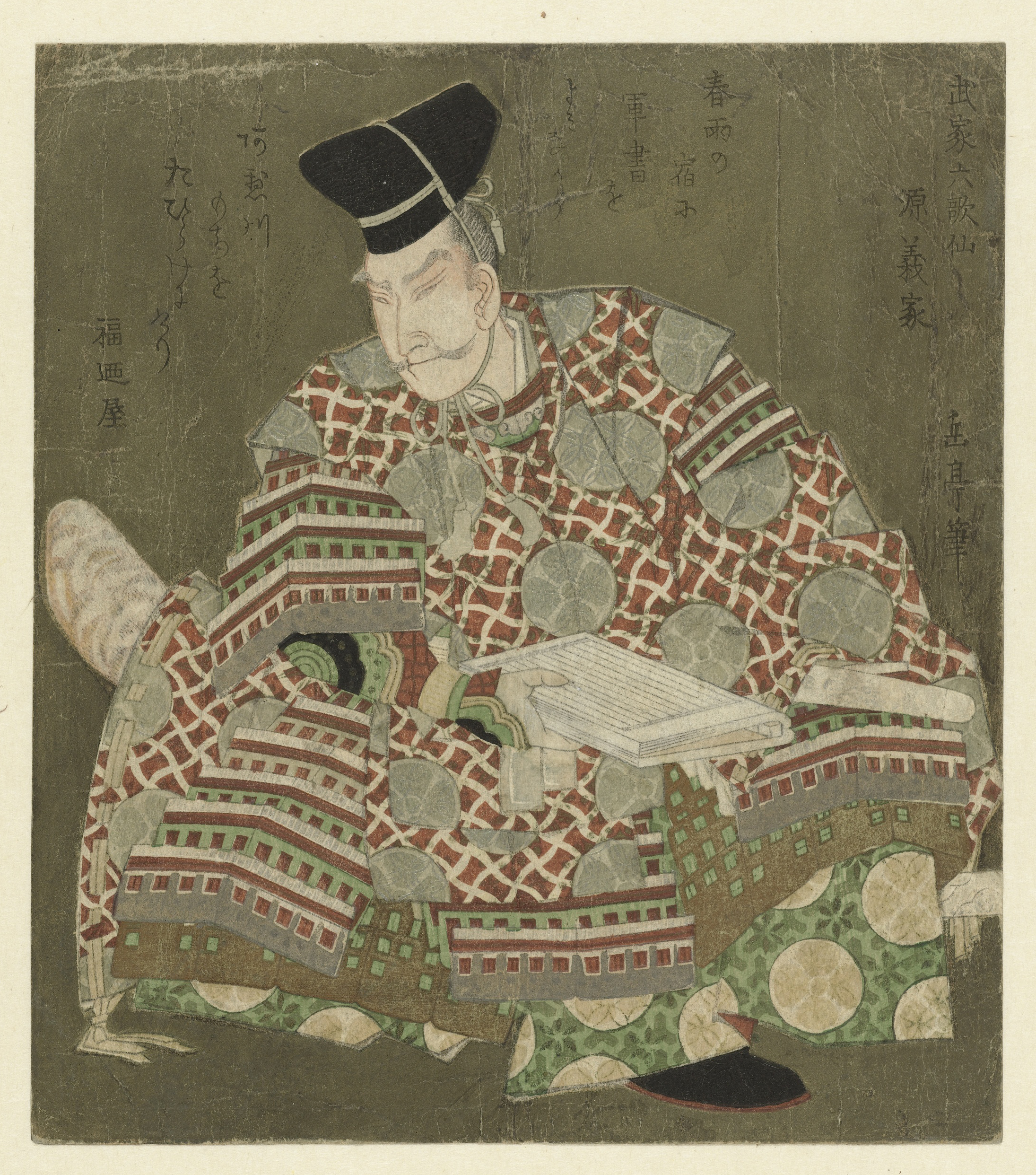
Minamoto no Yoshiie by Yashima Gakutei, 1825.

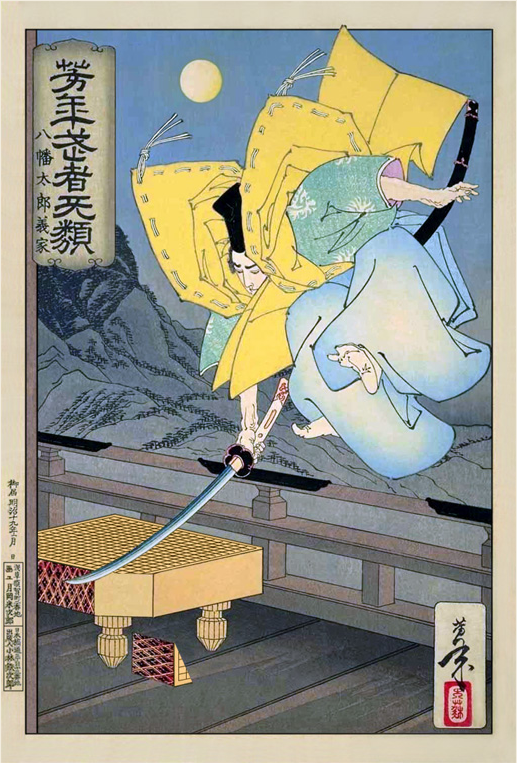
"Minamoto no Yoshiie" by Tsuioka Yoshitoshi. This woodblock print depicts a story from the 9th chapter of the Kokon Chomonju. A husband suspects his wife is having an affair with a samurai, Yoshiie, and surrounds his house with brambles. When Yoshiie simply jumps over the brambles, the husband places a Go board by the balcony in hopes of tripping him. Instead, Yoshiie slices the Go board.

Minamoto no Yoshiie (源 義家; Japanese pronunciation: [mʲì.nä́.mó̞.tó̞ nó̞ | jò̞.ɕí.ì.è̞, -nó̞ jó̞-]; 1039 – 4 August 1106), also known as Hachimantarō Yoshiie (八幡太郎義家) and his title Most Valorous Warrior in the Land (天下第一武勇之士), was a Minamoto clan samurai of the late Heian period, and Chinjufu-shōgun (Commander-in-chief of the defense of the North).

The first son of Minamoto no Yoriyoshi, he proved himself in battle with the Abe clan in the Zenkunen War (Former Nine Years' War) and the Kiyohara clan in the Gosannen War (Later Three Years' War). Subsequently, he became something of a paragon of samurai skill and bravery. Oe no Masafusa was his teacher for the art of war. He was the third generation leader of the Kawachi Genji.

In legends, such as The Tale of the Heike, Yoshiie is thought to be the son or avatar of Hachiman. After his death, he was elevated to Kami status and renamed 'Hachimantaro', which means 'son of Hachiman', the Shinto god of war. The Minamoto clan made him their Patron Ancestral Kami. He is worshipped as a god of victory.

Yoshiie was also a great-great-great-grandson of Prince Sadasumi, a son of Emperor Seiwa, through a junior line.

== The Zenkunen War ==
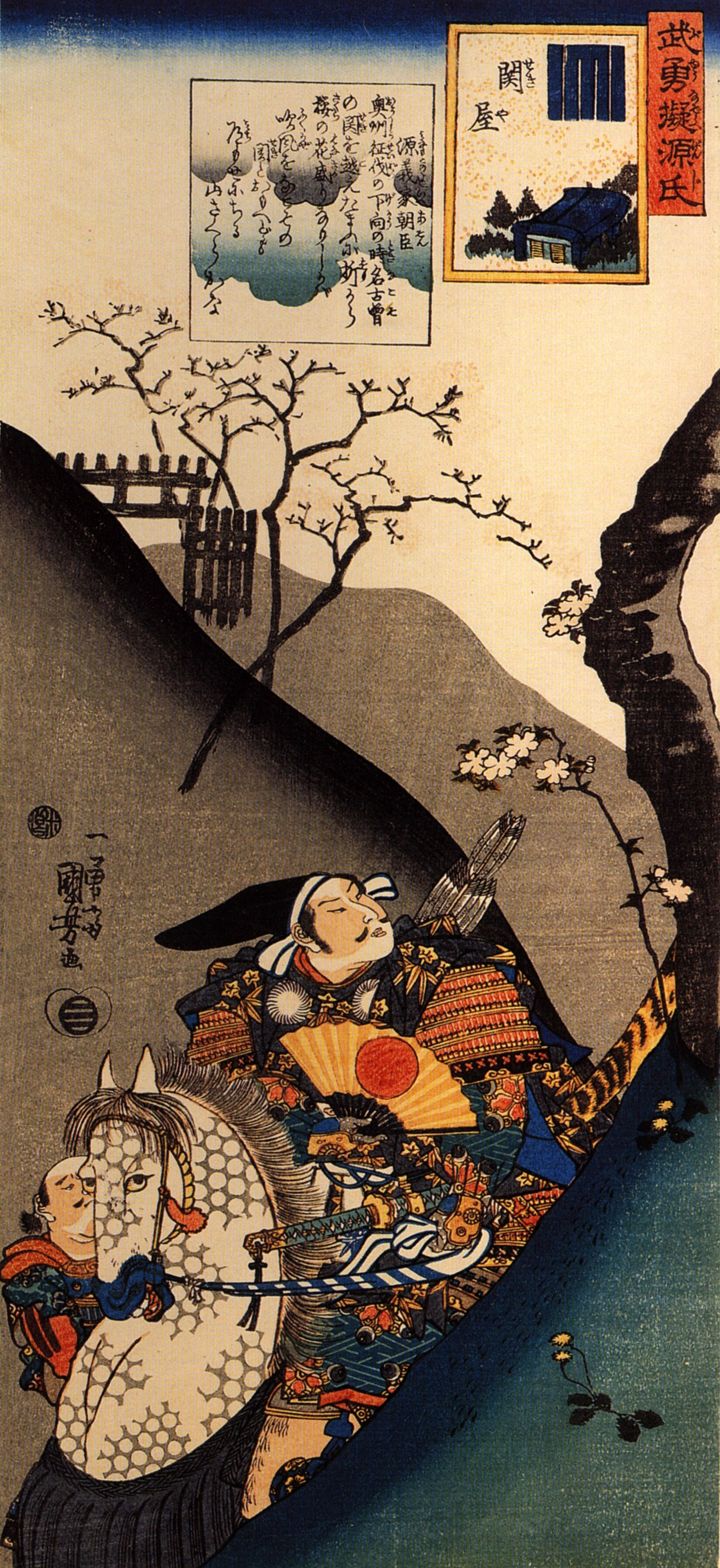
Minamoto no Yoshiie holds a Japanese war fan which has a symbol of the Japanese sun disc

In 1050, Abe no Yoritoki wave the post of Chinjufu-shōgun, as the Abe clan had for many generations. Effectively, however, Yoritoki commanded the entire region, denying the official Governor any true power. As a result, Yoshiie's father was appointed both chinjufu shōgun and governor, and Yoshiie traveled north with him to resolve the situation.

The campaign against the Abe clan lasted twelve years. Yoshiie fought alongside his father in almost every battle, including the Battle of Kawasaki and the Siege of Kuriyagawa. Abe no Yoritoki died in 1057, but his son Abe no Sadato took up command of his father's forces. But in 1062, Yoshiie defeated and killed Sadato, winning the war a year later.

Yoshiie returned to Kyoto in early 1063 with the heads of Abe no Sadato and a number of others.

As a result of his dramatic prowess in battle, he earned the name Hachiman taro, referring to him as the "son of Hachiman", the god of war. The following year, Yoshiie took several followers of the Abe, who he had taken as captives, as attendants Abe no Munetō became his retainer.

== The Later Three Years' War ==
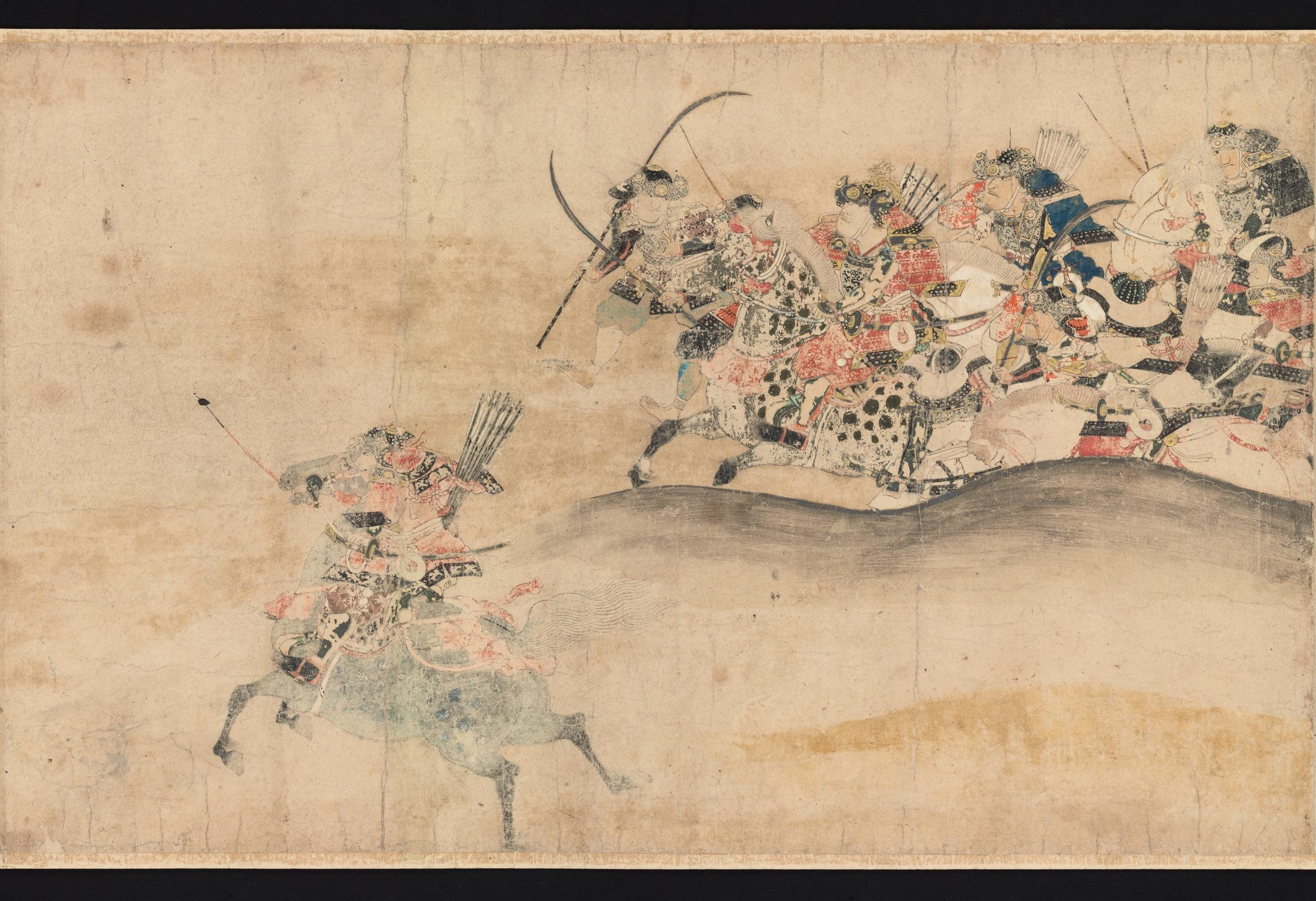
The Later Three Year War

Over twenty years later, Yoshiie was the chief commander in another important conflict of the Heian period. Beginning in 1083, he battled the Kiyohara family, who had fought alongside him and his father against the Abe, but who had since proven themselves poor rulers of the northern provinces.

Named Governor of Mutsu province in 1083, Yoshiie took it upon himself, without orders from the Imperial Court, to bring some peace and order to the region. A series of disputes between Kiyohara no Masahira, Kiyohara no Narihira, and Kiyohara no Iehira over leadership of the clan had turned to violence.

There emerged a series of battles and skirmishes between Yoshiie's forces and those of the various Kiyohara sub-factions. Everything came to a head in 1087, at the Kanazawa stockade. Yoshiie, along with his younger brother, Minamoto no Yoshimitsu and Fujiwara no Kiyohira, assaulted the position held by Kiyohara no Iehira and his uncle Kiyohara no Takahira. After many months of failed starts and skirmishes, the stockade was set aflame, and both Takahira and Iehira were killed. The Minamoto forces suffered great losses as well. But it is said that Yoshiie was an especially skilled leader, keeping morale up and preserving a degree of discipline among the warriors.

== Later life ==
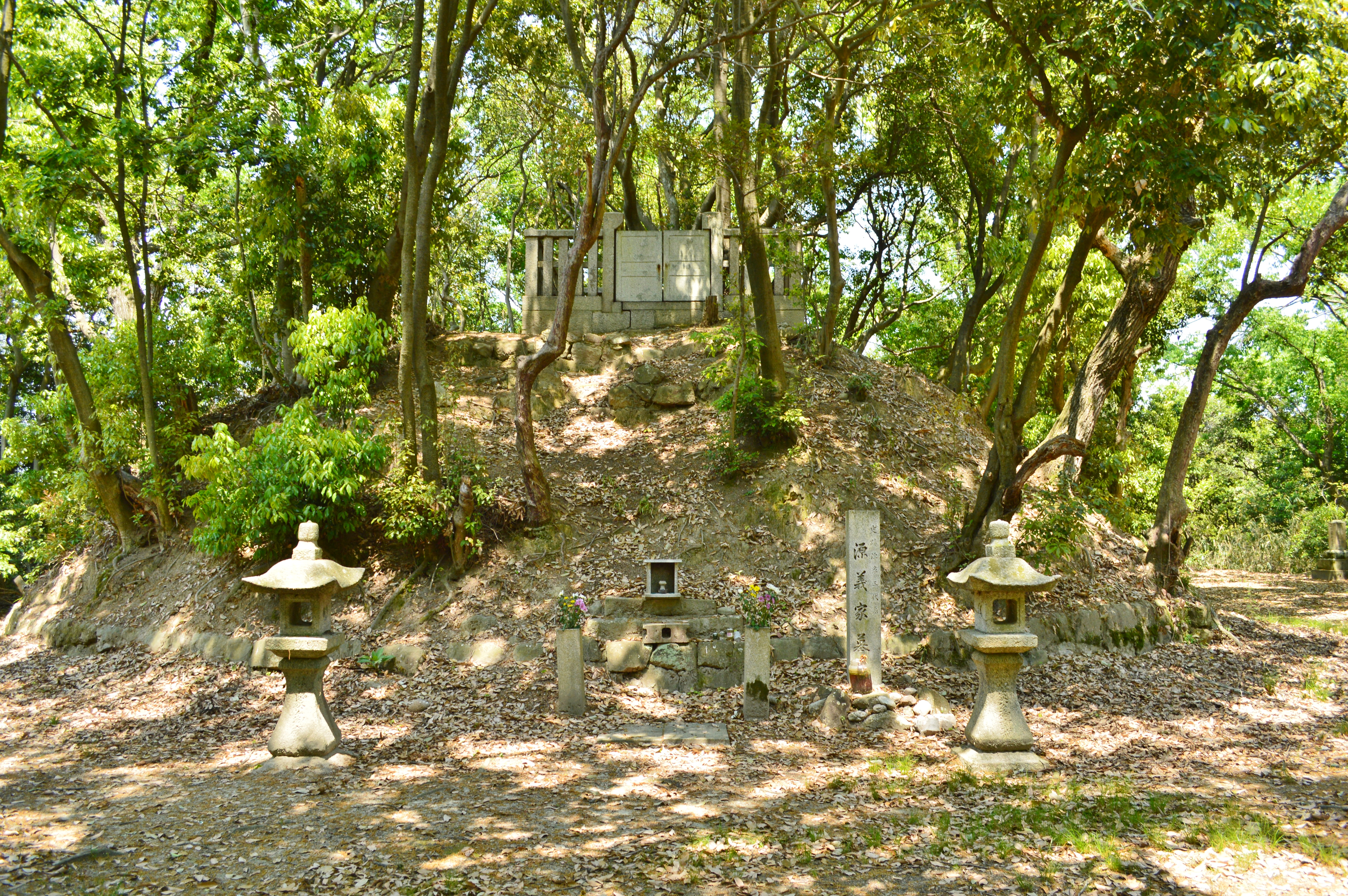
Tomb of Minamoto no Yoshiie

He and his younger brother Minamoto no Yoshitsuna were imperial guards for Emperor Shirakawa forming the Hokumen no Bushi. At 1098 he was invited to the Imperial Palace which was a high honor at the time. In 1106, Yoshiie’s son Yoshichika disapproved the government and started a revolt which was put down in by Taira general Masamori, father of Taira no Tadamori. That same year he died. Despite his early death, Yoshiie was remembered by many as a skilled warrior and a respected leader. He was revered as a patron saint of the warrior class and was celebrated in Japanese literature and folklore for centuries after his death. Yoshiie "would go on to be admired by his contemporaries as the greatest warrior."

Emperor Goshirakawa compiled the Ryojin Hishō, a collection of short stories and poems that were well-known during his time. One poem in the collection says: “In the deep mountains where all the birds live, there lives the Minamoto clan. Of all of them, Hachimantarō is the most formidable.” This poem is proof that Minamoto no Yoshiie was especially feared among the Genji clan because of his brutal demeanor and strength.

== Legacy ==
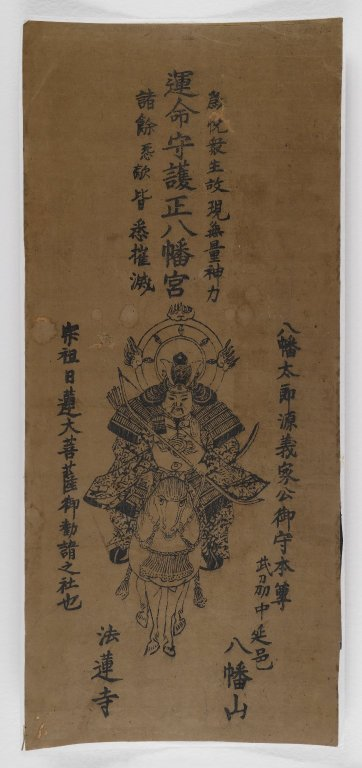
Brooklyn Museum - Minamoto no Yoshiie Riding on a Horse (the God of Hachiman)

As sung in the Ryōjin Hishō, Hachimantarō — or Minamoto no Yoshiie — was known for his exceptional skills as a warrior and was highly regarded as a hero of the Heian period.

By other countless famous figures from Minamoto no Yoritomo to Tokugawa Ieyasu, Yoshiie was considered to be the model of an ideal military commander. Ashikaga Takauji, the first and founding shogun of the Ashikaga shogunate, had reportedly considered Yoshiie to be of a “world-renowned” military commander and revered him as such. Tokugawa Ieyasu, born Matsudaira Takechiyo, had later changed his name to Ieyasu for the reason being it shared a kanji character with Yoshiie’s name (both Ieyasu and Yoshiie’s names share the kanji character 家). Some also say he may have claimed Minamoto lineage due to how high of a regard he held Yoshiie.

The relationship between Yoshiie and his vassals, particularly during the Later Three Year War, developed into the basic principle of “loyalty and reward” that rose to prevalence in the Kamakura shogunate, during Minamoto no Yoritomo’s time. For example, a samurai’s vassals would promise their loyalty to the samurai, whilst the samurai would personally reward them for their loyalty. This allowed the Kawachi Genji to easily gain the loyalty of lower-level samurais without directly requiring authority comparable to that of the Imperial Court. By implementing and passing down the “loyalty and reward” principle, Minamoto no Yoshiie’s legacy as the ideal military commander continued to live on through the later generations of the Minamoto clan.

Yoshiie is noted in Japanese history as one of its most brilliant warriors. Nobles of the day referred to him as "The Samurai of The Greatest Bravery Under Heaven." Courageous in battle, he is also remembered as an accomplished poet and a motivating leader. As the Heian period drew to a close, and the stability that had marked this phase of Japanese history became increasingly fractured and strained, the imperial court frequently called Yoshiie and his Minamoto warriors into service to subdue rebels and quiet unruly segments of the country. It was partially based on the gains made by Yoshiie during his career that the Minamoto clan established themselves as one of the pre-eminent military clans in the realm, positioning themselves for the ultimate wresting of political power from the emperor and the court in Kyoto, or those who controlled it, and the establishment of the shōgunate in Kamakura, barely a hundred years later, in 1192, under Minamoto Yoritomo.

Yet, despite his accomplishments as a warrior and general, he is remembered for events that are largely apocryphal in nature, embellished over time to give an even deeper luster to his achievements: the episode at Yuhajino no Izumi ("The Spring Revealed by the Strike of a Bow"), an impromptu poetry competition held on horseback between Yoshiie and his enemy Abe Sadato during a chase, and an interpretation of the erratic behavior of a flock of birds to uncover an ambush during “the Battle of Kanazawa....”

== Legends ==
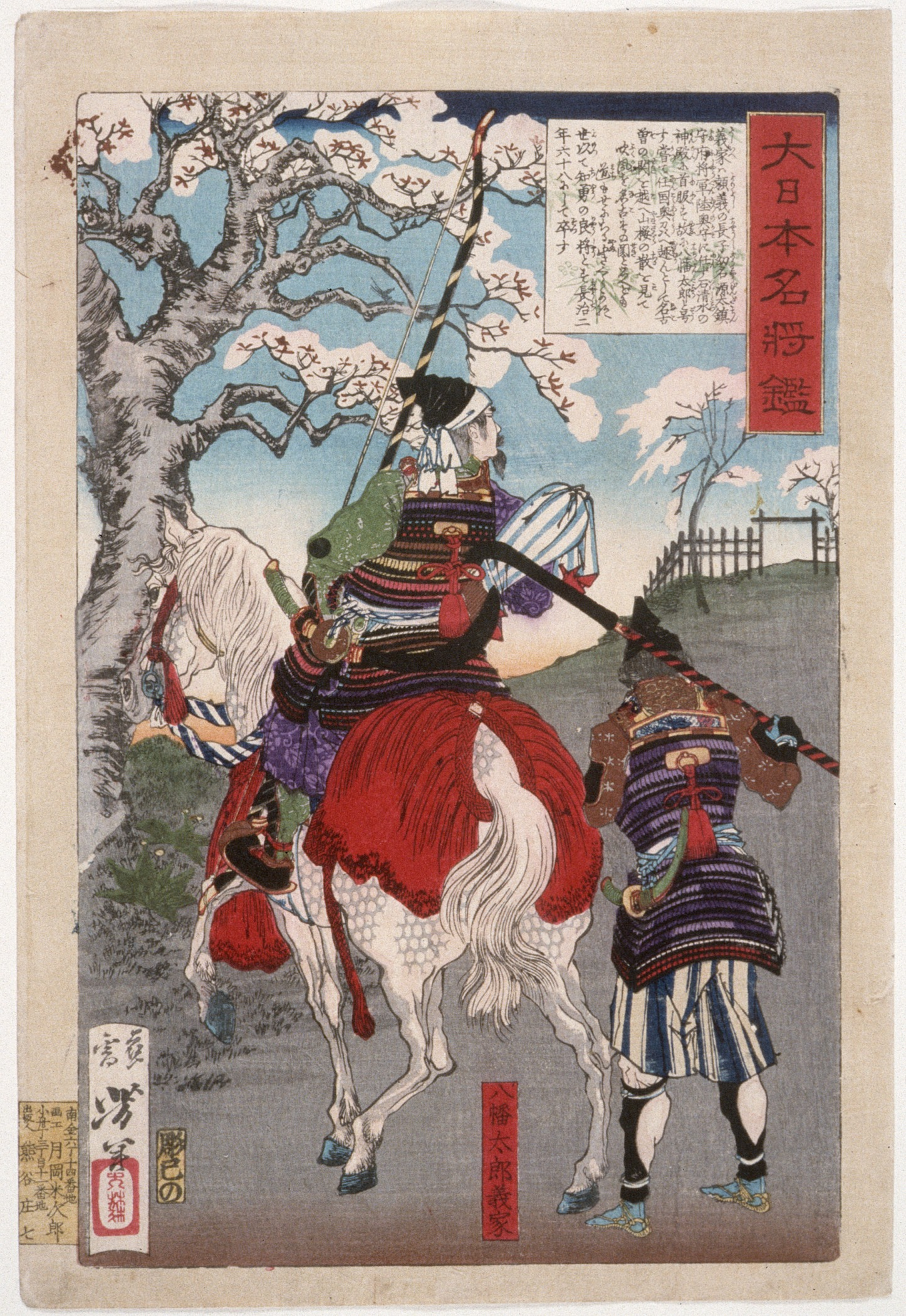
Hachiman Taro Yoshiie at Nakoso Barrier by Tsukioka Yoshitoshi

"On a hot day in the spring of 1057, Minamoto no Yoshiie (1039-1106), then barely sixteen years old, was leading his troops into a battle against Abe Sadato. Yoshiie had only months before joined his fathers forces in their efforts to subdue the Abe clan and had already established his reputation as a ferocious warrior, garnering him the sobriquet Hachiman Taro Yoshiie, or "Yoshiie, first son of Hachiman (the God of War)." On this particular day, the troops in their armor were suffering from the oppressive heat. With no immediate water source in sight, Yoshiie, praying to Kannon (the Goddess of Mercy), shot an arrow into the air. Tracing the arrow to where it landed, Yoshiie used his bow to dig into the earth, releasing an unknown spring of water. Refreshed and strengthened by the waters from this divine spring, Yoshiie and his forces went on to win a major victory over the Abe.

The Tenkoumaru is a Japanese sword (particularly, a long-bladed tachi) that is said to have been made during the Heian period. It is designated as a National Treasure of Japan and is preserved in the Tsuboi Hachimangu Shrine in Hakibino, Osaka Prefecture. It is also at times referred to as the “Blade of Tenkoumaru”.

It is a blade forged by the swordsmith Yasutsuna from the Hōki Province, who was active during the Heian period; the same swordsmith well-known for forging the famous Doujigiri Yasutsuna. According to the picture scroll “Kawachi Meisho Zue”, Tenkoumaru is said to be a “sister sword” of Doujigiri, meaning that the two blades were forged from the same iron.

The origin of the Tenkoumaru is described in volume four of the archive “History of Hakibino City”. The archive describes a former owner of the Tenkoumaru, who lost the sword whilst escaping to the foot of Mount Kongo. After several years of searching, the sword was never found until another man had discovered the Tenkoumaru buried beneath the mountain soil after having witnessed a “shining light from beneath the soil”. Through unknown means, the Tenkoumaru eventually ended up in the possession of Minamoto no Mitsunaka, who passed the sword down to his son, Minamoto no Yorinobu, with it again being passed down to Minamoto no Yoshiie as one of the treasured swords of the Minamoto clan. On October 14, 1935, the Tenkoumaru was designated as a National Treasure of Japan.

The length of the blade itself is 76.8 cm, the degree of curvature is about 2.5 cm, and the tang (part of the blade where the hilt would be affixed) is 20 cm.

He was gifted the swords Onikiri and Hizamaru the Seiwa Genji heirlooms.

Genta ga Ubukinu is a suit of armour that is said to have been used and extensively passed down the Minamoto clan. It is also sometimes written or known as “Genta ga Ubuginu”, “Kuwantaka Ubuginu”, “Armour of Guwatsuta”, and “Armour of Maruta”. It is said that Minamoto no Yoriyoshi, who served Koichijo-in faithfully, had witnessed the birth of his son Minamoto-no-Yoshiie and was notably overjoyed at his birth, eventually passing the armour down to him. It is said that the deities Amaterasu and Hachiman were depicted on the chest plate, and wisteria flowers were displayed on its sleeves. During the Heiji Rebellion, Minamoto-no-Yoritomo donned the Genta ga Ubukinu. At the time, he was around twelve years old. It is one of the eight armor of the Genji Hachiryo.

In the legends of The Tale of Tsuru no Hanagata Castle (鶴の羽形城物語) and The Legend of Princess Unohana (卯の花姫伝説) the daughter of Abe no Sadato was a woman named Hanahime who was known to be a stubborn, beautiful woman who excelled in martial arts and wanted to end the war as soon as possible. When Minamoto no Yoriyoshi became the Governor of Mutsu Province, the Abe clan held a grand feast to celebrate Yoriyoshi’s promotion, which is where Hanahime met Yoshiie and eventually formed a close relationship with him. Yoshiie and Hanahime’s relationship later reached a point where they regularly sent letters to each other, and Hanahime once received a letter from Yoshiie saying, “I will welcome you to the capital as my wife”, but their relationship was sadly torn apart due to the Former Nine Years’ War. After the Abe family was defeated, Hanahime and Yoshiie fled to Dewa and traversed the Ishikari mountain range. Hanahime set up camp on one of the mountains near a river, and with the help of monks and soldiers, she fought against the Abe clan alongside the Minamoto, but her struggle was futile and she was eventually overpowered. Hanahime threw herself off the cliff in Mibuchi Valley, committing suicide because she refused to surrender. The handmaids who had accompanied her followed suit, also throwing themselves into the valley, while the remaining soldiers were killed in battle. After this, she was worshipped as a dragon god.

== Family ==
- Father: Minamoto no Yoriyoshi (源頼義, 988–1075)
- Mother: Daughter of Taira no Naokata (平直方の娘)
  - Wife: Daughter of Fujiwara no Aritsuna (藤原有綱の娘)
    - Son: Minamoto no Yoshichika (? - 1108)
    - Son: Minamoto no Yoshikuni (源義国, 1082–1155)
      - Son Minamoto no Yoshimune
        - Son Minamoto no Yoshitaka
          - Son Minamoto no Yoshitada
            - Son Minamoto no Yoshitoki

== Family tree ==
Emperor Seiwa
Prince Sadazumi	Emperor Yōzei
Minamoto no Tsunemoto
Minamoto no Mitsunaka
Kawachi Genji	Yamato Genji	Settsu Genji
Minamoto no Yorinobu	Minamoto no Yorichika	Minamoto no Yorimitsu
Minamoto no Yoriyoshi	Minamoto no Yorikuni
Mino Genji
Minamoto no Yoshimitsu	Minamoto no Yoshiie	Minamoto no Yoritsuna	Minamoto no Kunifusa

== See also ==
- Seiwa Genji
- Minamoto no Yoritomo, the first shōgun of the Kamakura shogunate.
- Ashikaga Takauji, the first shōgun of the Ashikaga shogunate.
- Tokugawa Ieyasu, the first shōgun of the Tokugawa shogunate.
- Scroll of the Latter Three Years' War
- Heike Tsuruginomaki
- Kamakura Gongorō Kagemasa
- Tsūhō-ji
- Nue
