= Scroll of the Latter Three Years' War =

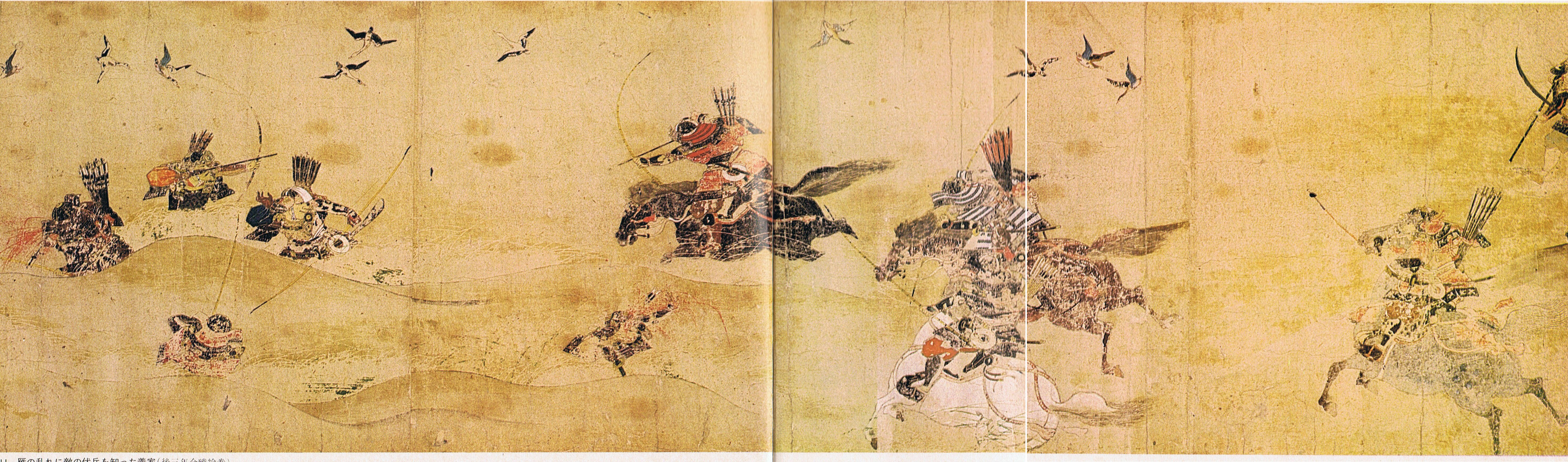
Gosannen War Picture Scroll" Based on the soldier book learned from Ōe no Masafusa, Minamoto no Yoshiie learned of the enemy's ambush from the disorder of the row of geese and shot and killed it. The Gosannen War occurred in Mutsu Province on the main island Honshū. between 1083 and 1089 CE.

The Scroll of the Later Three Years' War (後三年合戦絵詞, Go-Sannen Kassen Ekotoba) is an important cultural piece kept in the Tokyo National Museum. The story is told through Japanese picture scrolls that provide text and pictures about the large-scale battle over power between two samurai groups, Minamoto no Yoshiie and Kiyohara no Iehira during the Heian Period. The emaki is divided into three volumes, with each volume having five sections.

== Summary ==
=== Volume 1 ===
Section 1
After hearing that Iehira drove away Governor Yoshiie. Takehira gathered his troops in Mutsu, crossed Dewa to meet up with Iehira. Takehira told Iehira that by driving away such a strong warrior as Governor Yoshiie, it brings both Iehira and Takehira a great sense of honour, since Governor Yoshiie has a greater reputation than that both the Minamoto and Taira families. However, as consequence of driving away Governor Yoshiie, their fates have been sealed and so they will die together. With these words of encouragement Iehira obtained a sense of pride and so invited Takehira to Fort Kanezawa, where they can seek better shelter and support.

Section 2
Minamoto no Yoshimitsu, the brother of Shogun Yoshiie resigns his position in office on account that the Retired Emperor did not grant his appeal to join his brother in the life or death battle against Takehira. Now, with Yoshimitsu on the battlefield, the frontal forces of Yoshiie began their attack on the Fort.

Members of the fort fought back with arrows and one of them injured Kagemasa of Sagami, 16 who fought recklessly against the enemy. This arrow had gone through Kagemasa’ helmet and pierced him in his right eye. Kagemasa, who had broken off a part of that arrow and threw it back at the enemy, then took off his helmet to announce his injury. Miura Tametsugu, another soldier from the same town as Kagemasa, stepped on Kagemasa’s face with his shoe in attempt to remove the arrow, but still on the ground, Kagemasa grabbed Tametsugu and pointed his sword at him telling him to stop for it is a desire of a warrior to be killed with an arrow wound. Yoshiie’s soldiers were still unable to break through the fort. A soldier named Sukekane who had his helmet from the armor of Usugane by the Shogun destroyed by stone bows.

Section 3
Governor Yoshiie became angry after learning that Takehira had joined allegiance with Iehira. Thus in turn he focused all of his time and energy into preparing military forces. After the spring and summer seasons, he led his forces of twenty thousand men towards Fort Kanezawa.

A soldier named Daizo Mitsutou decided not to participate in the military force and stayed. Weeping he exclaimed how a pity it is to become old that he might not witness Yoshiie’s great performance.

Section 4
The Shogun arrive in front of Fort Kanesawa. However in a distance a flock of geese broke formation. This signalled Yoshiie that there are concealed enemy warriors ready to combat. After sending men to inspect the grounds, they found and killed 30 enemy warriors who were waiting to ambush the Shogun.

Masafusa, who had overheard a conversation in the past between Yoshiie and Lord Fujiwara no Yorimichi at Uji explain how he attacked Sadatou, had remarked that Yoshiie is a good soldier but he does not know the way of battle. This. One of Yoshiie’s men reported this information to Yoshiie. But Yoshiie dismissed the complaint and even agreed to Masafusa’s words. He claims that if it wasn’t for the classics that Masafusa helped Yoshiie learn to read, he might have lost this battle to Takehira.

Section 5
After days of failing to progress in breaking down the fort, two sets of seats were established to spark motivation for the soldiers: Seats of Bravery and Seats of Cowardice. Due to the fact that no one wanted to be in the cowardice seats they fought harder each day making it harder to earn a seat. However one man, Koshi no Sue Kata had always earned a seat. It was also stated that the 5 soldiers on the coward’s seats were so brave, that they filled their ears to avoid hearing the siren.

=== Volume 2 ===
Section 1
The shogun were still having difficulties in breaking through the fort of Takehira. Thus, Yoshihiko Hidetake suggested that they stop the attack and wait for the enemy’s food supply to diminish so that they can siege the fort. After days of waiting, Takehira proposes that both sides choose a representative fighter to face the other in combat to pass time. Takehira’s side selected a man named Kametsugu while the Shogun selected a man named Onitake. The two fought for over one hour with neither showing any sign of weakness until suddenly, Kametsugu charged his sword in the air three times. The next moment his head and helmet was on the tip of the sword of Onitake.

Section 2
After Onitake’s victory over Kametsugu, the Shogun’s forces began to cry out shouts of victory and taunts to the enemy lines. The soldiers of Fort Kanesawa immediately rushed out to reclaim the fallen soldier’s head. This led the two sides to clash in battle. The Shogun’s forces out numbered the Fort Kametsugu side and so all of the soldiers were killed. It is noted that Suewari no Korehiro a soldier on the cowardice seat tried to redeem himself by charging to the frontlines while still chewing his unfinished meal. An arrow struck his neck and so he spat out his food.

Section 3
Iehira’s foster father, Chitou stood at the top of the fort and stated to Iehira that his father Yoriyoshi once sought assistance from the late Kiyo Shogun against Sadatou and Munetou. It was because of this assistance that Yoriyoshi was able to take Sadatou. He suggests that Iehira of the same bloodline is wrong to turn against his family’s old Lord. However, Yoshiie tells his men not to spare Chitou’s life for it has no value.

Section 4
The food conditions for the people behind the Fort Kanesawa were growing scarce. In response to this Takehira sent a messenger to Yoshimitsu asking for terms of surrender. However the Shogun refused to allow the surrender of the enemy. Takehira asked Yoshimitsu if he would come to the fort so that they can work out a solution. When Yoshiie found out of this he told Yoshimitsu not to go for if he would be taken hostage, Yoshiie would not know what to do. Thus Yoshimitsu changed his mind. Takehira’s persistence led him to ask Yoshimitsu to send a messenger. Suekata was sent and was offered gold as a peace offering, but Suekata refused the offer and claimed that soon everything will belong to the Shogunate.

Section 5
When the season changed from Autumn to Winter, the Shogunate warriors were having a difficult time coping. They wrote letters, sent clothes and horses for their wives and children at home so that they can journey to the capital for safety.

From the fort however in order to preserve food, the women and children of lower rank were sent outside the fort. Hidetaki however suggested to the Shogun that they should kill these women and children on site to prevent more people from leaving the fort. The more people there would be in the fort, the more scarce the food supply would become. So these women and children were shot.

=== Volume 3 ===
Section 1
Shogun Yoshiie one night woke up from his sleep and instructed Fujiwara Sukemichi, one of his favourite soldiers who at the age of thirteen never broke battle formation to tell his soldiers to burn their tents to keep warm as this is the night that Takehira and Iehira will fall. Everyone obeyed and by morning the enemy had fallen.

Section 2
Takehira and Iehira eventually ran entirely out of food and lost their fort on the evening of the fourteenth day of the eleven month of the fifth year of Kanji. The Shogun set fires to every house populated or vacant in the fort were burnt. Takehira hid himself in a pond with his body half submerged behind some bushes but was eventually discovered and captured along with Chitou. Iehira on the other hand managed to disguise himself as a commoner and escape only after killing his horse, Hanakoji whom he had loved even more than his own wife and kids with his own hands. The beautiful women were then gathered while their husbands were decapitated.

Section 3
After being captured by the Shogun’s soldiers Takehira was brought forth in front of the feet of Shogun Yoshiie where he was insulted as a soldier who has no honour of fighting his enemy. The Shogun has also mentioned that a man named Takenori was made governor by the support of the governor of the time, and has repaid his services whereas Takehira has done nothing bur rebel, even though his father Yoriyoshi has received assistance from a previous Shogun. Takehira puts his head on the floor cries and begs the Shogun to spare his life. However, the Shogun has Mitsufusa to slash a part of Takehira’s head.

Upon having his head slashed, he even tries to ask Yoshimitsu for assistance and forgiveness. Yoshimitsu tries to provide reasoning to the Shogun, but the Shogun argues that a man who is caught in a fight and asks for his life is not a man who surrenders. After the beheading of Takehira, Yoshiie orders a soldier to pull out the tongue of Chitou. The first soldier tries to use his hands but is told that he is putting his hands into the mouth of a tiger and so the Shogun asks another soldier to use a pair of tongs to pull out his tongue.

Chitou is then tied to a tree branch with Takehira’s head placed at his feet. After trying to keep his feet from touching the head of his master, Chitou lost his strength and rested his feet on Takehira’s head. Shogun Yoshiie is left with now wanting the head of Iehira.

Section 4
A well known soldier named Agata no Tsugutou was on the roadside as many people fled the Fort. Among them was Iehira in disguise as a servant. Tsugutou saw through Iehira’s disguise and killed him. Tsugutou then decapitated Iehira’s head and presented it to the Shogun who in glee presented Tsugutou with a red cloth and an excellent horse. The Shogun then arranged for a gathering of Iehira’s followers.

Section 5
The Shogun wrote an official report to the central government requesting an official ordinance for bringing the heads of Takehira and Iehira, who he saw as a rebellious force that was like the Sadatou and Munetou but worse. This appeal was denied as this battle was only regarded as a personal matter. This was disappointing to the Shogun, as an ordination would have meant a reward. Thus the soldiers threw the heads of their victims to the side of the road and returned to the capital defeated.
