= Siege of Kuriyagawa =

Battle in Japan in 1062

- Part of Zenkunen War
Date	1062
Location	Japan
Result	Minamoto victory

Belligerents
Minamoto forces	Abe forces

Commanders and leaders
Minamoto no Yoshiie	Abe no Sadato

The siege of Kuriyagawa was a battle during the Heian period (11th century) of Japan.

This rather minor siege, which was a part of the Zenkunen War, ended with the victory of the Minamoto. Throughout this siege, Abe commander Abe no Sadato ended up being defeated in his stockade fortress of Kuriyagawa. Minamoto no Yoshiie established Tsurugaoka Hachiman-gū within Kamakura to give thanks to his victorious Minamoto allies.
