= Battle of Kawasaki =

1057 battle of the Former Nine Years' War

- Part of the Zenkunen War
Date	1057
Location	Kawasaki, Mutsu province 38°50′54″N 141°17′37″E
Result	Abe victory

Belligerents
Minamoto forces	Abe forces

Commanders and leaders
Minamoto no Yoriyoshi; Minamoto no Yoshiie	Abe no Sadato

Strength
1,800	4,000
- Location within Iwate Prefecture Battle of Kawasaki (Japan)

The Battle of Kawasaki was the first major battle of the Early Nine Years' War (Zenkunen War) (1051–1063). It was fought between the forces of the Abe clan, led by Abe no Sadato, and those of the Minamoto clan, acting as agents of the Imperial Court, and led by Minamoto no Yoriyoshi and his eighteen-year-old son Yoshiie.

== History ==
Much of the battle took place during a snowstorm, and consisted of Minamoto assaults on Abe no Sadato's entrenched army of 4000 warriors. In the end, the Minamoto were driven off, due to a combination of Abe resistance and the weather, and were pursued through the blizzard by Sadato and his men. "In the end only six officers on horseback were left. These were Yoshiie, Junior Secretary of Palace Repairs Fujiwara no Kagemichi, Oyake no Mitsuto, Kiyohara no Sadahiro, Fujiwara no Norisue and Noriakira."

The Mutsu Waki states, "The 200 horse-riding rebels half-circled and attacked them from the solid left and right wings, shooting arrows like rain. But Yoshiie kept shooting down enemy commanders. Finally, the rebels, deciding that these men were gods, retreated, so Yoriyoshi's men were also able to retreat."
