= Iehira =

- Gender: Male

Origin
- Origin: Japanese
- Meaning: Different meanings depending on the kanji used

Iehira (written: 家平 or 家衡) is a masculine Japanese given name. Notable people with the name include:

- Kiyohara no Iehira (清原 家衡; died 1087), Japanese samurai
- Konoe Iehira (近衛 家平; 1282–1324), Japanese kugyō
