= Kiyohara clan =

Clan of the far north of Japan during the Heian period

Kiyohara clan 清原氏
- Home province: Dewa; Yamashiro; Mutsu; Etchū
- Parent house: Imperial House of Japan
- Titles: Shugo; Kuge
- Founding year: 8th century
- Cadet branches: Masahira Kiyohara; Iehira Kiyohara; Narihira Kiyohara

The Kiyohara clan (清原氏, Kiyohara-shi) was a powerful clan of the far north of Japan during the Heian period, descended from Prince Toneri, son of Emperor Tenmu (631–686).

Kiyohara no Fusanori (9th century) had two sons: the elder was the ancestor of the samurai branch family of Dewa Province; the younger of the kuge (court nobles) branch of the clan.

The position of Governor of Dewa province was passed down within the family; the Kiyohara are particularly known for their involvement in the Zenkunen and Gosannen Wars of the 11th century.

The Early Nine Year's War (前九年合戦, Zenkunen kassen) erupted in 1051, when Minamoto no Yoriyoshi and his son Yoshiie arrived in the north, from Kyoto, as agents of the Imperial court. They were there to put an end to a conflict between the Governor of Mutsu Province (which bordered the Kiyohara's Dewa) and the Chinjufu-shōgun (Defender of the North), Abe no Yoritoki. The Kiyohara Governor of Dewa contributed warriors to the Minamoto effort, and aided in their victory over the Abe clan, which was achieved in 1063.

The Kiyohara then took over the administration of Mutsu, along with Dewa. Within the next twenty years, quarrels and conflicts arose within the family over differing interests arising from intermarriage with different warrior families. Kiyohara no Masahira, Iehira and Narihira, heads of branches of the family, created such a disturbance that Minamoto no Yoshiie, who had taken the formerly Abe post of Defender of the North, felt it necessary to interfere in the conflict. In 1083, he was appointed Governor of Mutsu, and arrived in the north to attempt to resolve the situation peaceably; he soon was forced to resort to gathering his own troops. After much fighting, the violence came to an end; Iehira and his uncle Kiyohara no Takahira had been killed, the other Kiyohara leaders surrendered. Control of both Dewa and Mutsu then passed to Fujiwara no Kiyohira, an ally of Yoshiie.

The kuge branch continued their legacy of scholarship, spawning writers, scholars, poets and artists. The descendants possessed hereditarily the office of daigeki. Kiyohara no Yorinari (1122–1189), son of the Daigeki Kiyohara no Suketada, was governor of Etchū Province and excelled in law, literature and history. The clan's Kyoto mansion, along with all the books and scrolls contained within, was destroyed in the Ōnin War of the late 15th century.

== Kiyohara of note ==
- Kiyohara no Fukayabu
- Kiyohara no Motosuke
- Sei Shōnagon - daughter of Motosuke, and one of the most famous women poets in all of Japanese history
- Kiyohara no Natsuno - jurist of the 9th century
- Kiyohara no Takahira
- Kiyohara no Iehira
- Kiyohara no Masahira
- Kiyohara no Narihira
