= Three Years' War =

Three Years' War may refer to:

- Father Rale's War (1722–1725), between the New England colonies and the Wabanaki Confederacy
- First Schleswig War (1848–1851), between Denmark and Prussia rooted over the Schleswig-Holstein Question
- Gosannen War, fought in the 1080s in Mutsu Province on the Japanese island of Honshū
- Reform War (1858–1860), Mexican civil war between liberals and conservatives over the Constitution of 1857
