= Kiyohara no Iehira =

Kiyohara no Iehira (清原家衡) (died 1087) was a member of the Kiyohara clan, which wielded significant power in the Tōhoku region from around 1063 to 1089, during Japan's Heian period; he was also a key participant in the Gosannen War which grew out of conflicts within the clan.

In the early 1080s, a conflict developed between Iehira and his relatives Narihira and Masahira, who were each head of one branch of the family; each desired to head the honke (main family line). By 1083, this conflict had erupted into outright violence. Minamoto no Yoshiie traveled to the region in hopes of settling the conflict and restoring peace and order.

Yoshiie allied himself to Iehira, and attempted to settle the issue diplomatically. When that failed, he went into battle, alongside Iehira and Fujiwara no Kiyohira, a cousin of the Kiyohara, against Kiyohara no Sanehira. After Sanehira's defeat, however, Iehira saw the possibility of his own rise to power improving; Yoshiie and Iehira turned on one another. The battles between the two would prove to be the main action of the war.

Iehira first made a stand in 1086 at a stockade called Numa. The Minamoto suffered heavy losses besieging this stockade, due primarily to the cold and snow, and had to withdraw. Iehira, with his uncle Takehira, then established a camp near Yoshiie's fortress at Kanezawa. Yoshiie, allied with his brother Yoshimitsu and Fujiwara Kiyohira, laid siege to the Kiyowara position from August to November 1087. The Kiyowara were defeated and both Iehira and Takehira killed.

According to the Kokon Chomonjū, Yoshiie saw a flock of birds emerge from the forest when he was on his way to attack the Kiyohara camp; this told him that an ambush had been set up, since the Kiyohara ambushers disturbed the birds, and thus Yoshiie was able to avoid the attack.
