= Fujiwara no Tsunekiyo =

Fujiwara no Tsunekiyo (藤原 経清; died October 22, 1062) was a member of the martial Hidesato branch of the Fujiwaras. He was the father of Fujiwara no Kiyohira, the founder of the Northern Fujiwara dynasty in Japan.

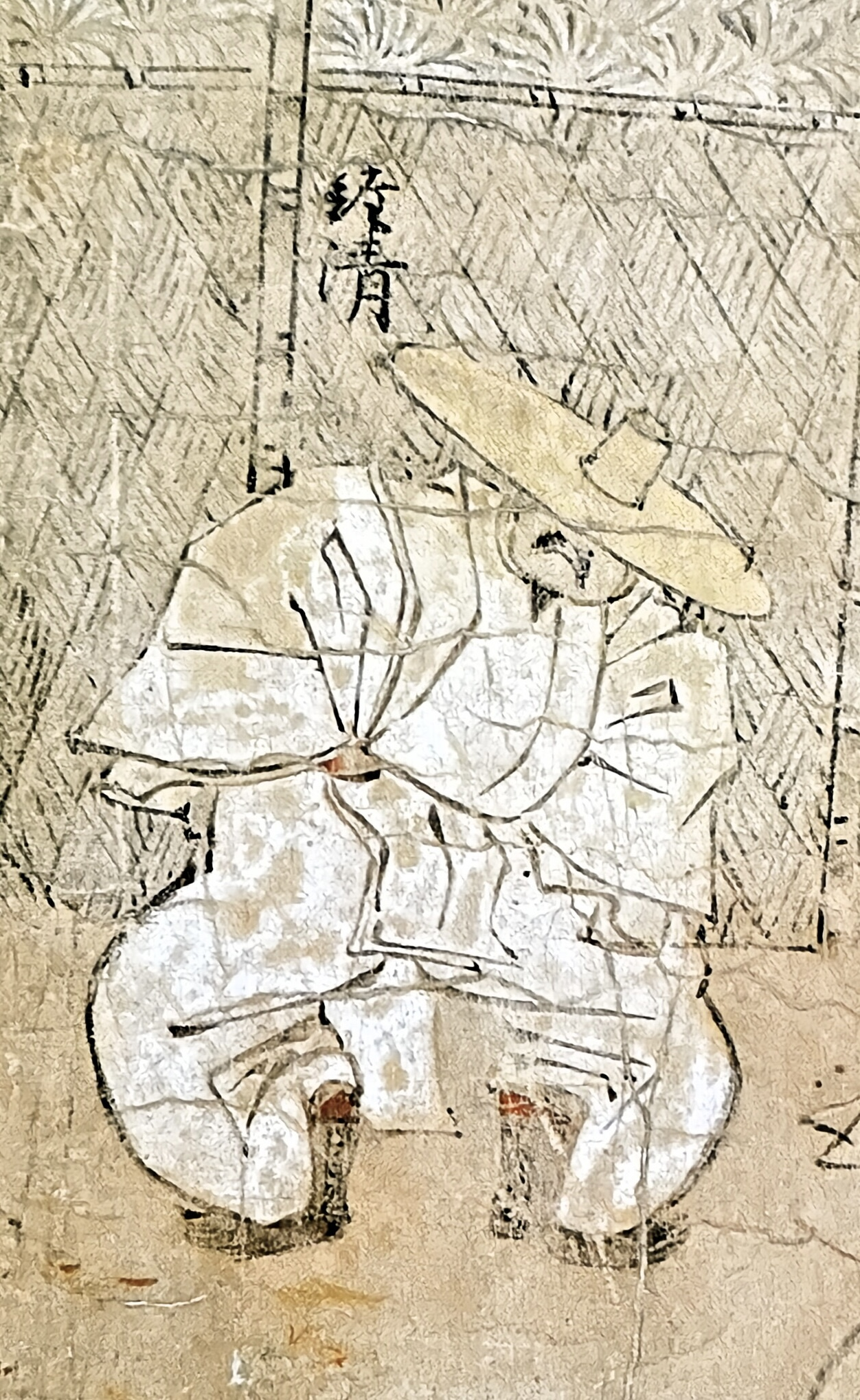

He is said to have been the eldest son of Fujiwara no Yoritō (藤原 頼遠), and to have come from the Watari District in what is now southern Miyagi Prefecture. He served for a time as a military bureaucrat at Fort Taga in modern-day Tagajō, Miyagi Prefecture.

Tsunekiyo married a daughter of Abe no Yoritoki, leader of the Emishi who ruled the Kitakami Basin in what is now Iwate Prefecture, and moved to Iwayadō Castle. When the Zenkunen War (前九年合戦) broke out, he fought with the Abe forces against the Central government forces led by the governor of Mutsu Province, Minamoto no Yoriyoshi. For this he was branded a traitor. After the Abe were defeated in 1062, Tsunekiyo was beheaded with a blunt sword by Yoriyoshi personally.
