= Chōjagahara temple ruins =

Archaeological site in Ōshū, Japan

- 長者ヶ原廃寺跡
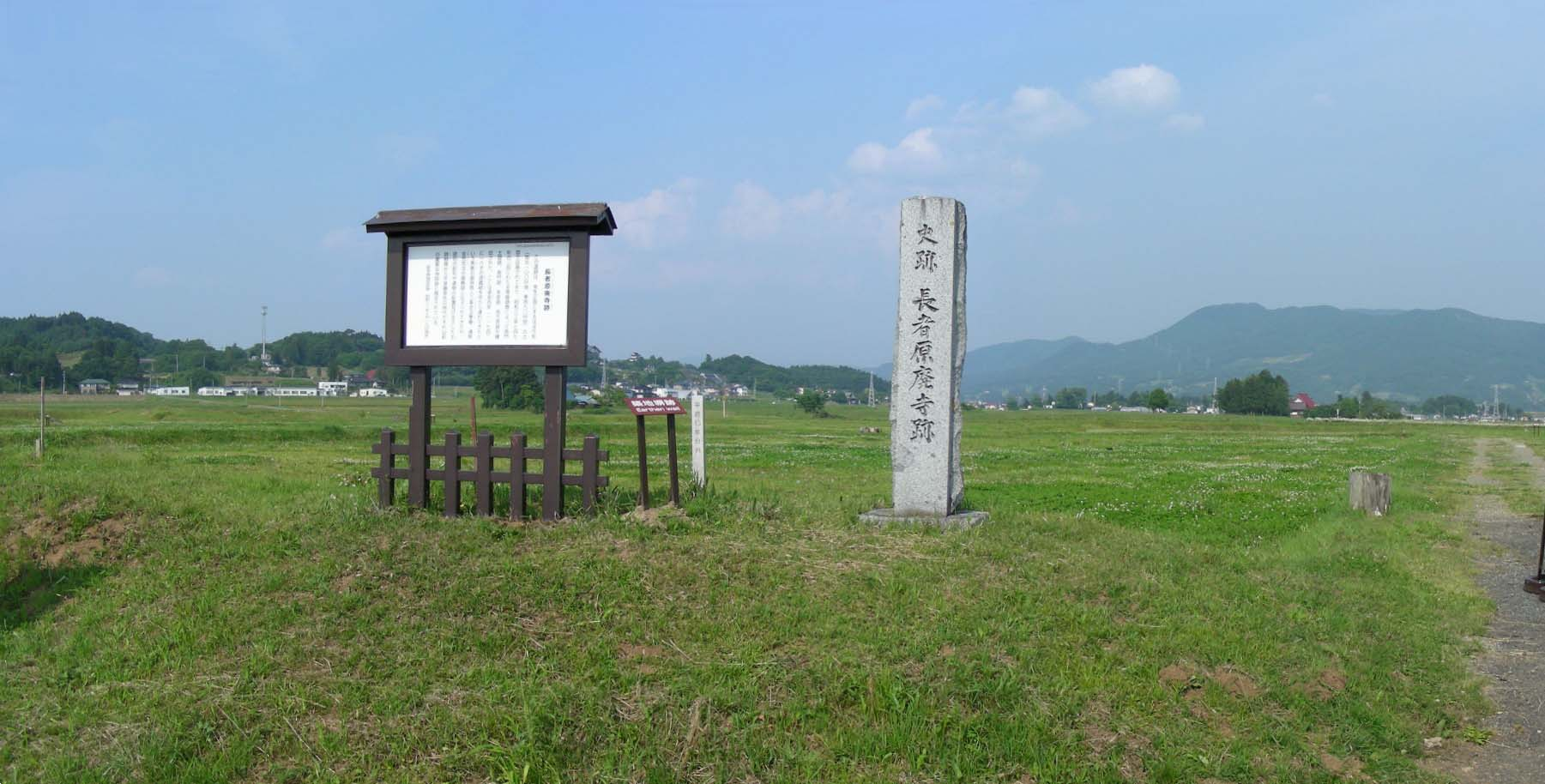
- Chōjagahara temple ruins

- Location within Iwate Prefecture Location within Japan

Religion
- Affiliation: Buddhist
- Status: ruins

Location
- Location: Ōshū, Iwate
- Country: Japan
- Interactive map of Chōjagahara temple ruins
- Coordinates: 39°15′45.3″N 141°8′23.8″E

Chōjagahara temple ruins (長者ヶ原廃寺跡, Chōjagahara Haiji) is an archaeological site with the ruins of a late Heian period Buddhist temple located in what is now the city of Ōshū, in northern Japan. The site was protected by the central government as a National Historic Site in the year 2002.

== Overview ==
The ruins are located about 1 kilometer north of Chūson-ji in Iwaizumi, and by tradition the site was the location of the fortified residence of Kinji Yoshitsuji, a gold merchant who was in the service of the Northern Fujiwara, especially Fujiwara no Hidehira. His name appears in the Heiji Monogatari, Heike Monogatari and other contemporary sources. However, per an archaeological excavation in 1958, it became apparent that this was the site of a major temple complex with predated Northern Fujiwara rule. The foundations of the South Gate and a western building were confirmed, and the site was surrounded by a wooden palisade and moats over 100 meters in length on each side. Numerous artifacts, including ink stones and many types of earthenware shards were recovered. However, as no Lecture Hall or dormitories for the training of monks was found, it appears that this temple was constructed over the palace of the Abe clan and was intended for prayers for the clan as their bodaiji. The name of the temple is unknown. Traces of heat on cornerstones and from excavated soils indicate that the temple was most likely destroyed by fire during the Former Nine Years War.

In 1189, after Minamoto no Yoritomo destroyed the Northern Fujiwara, he commented in the Azuma Kagami that he ordered a search for the ruins of the palace of the Abe clan which his grandfather, Minamoto no Yoriie had destroyed, but all that his men could find was a remnant of an earthen wall in a field overgrown with autumn grasses.

== See also ==
- List of Historic Sites of Japan (Iwate)
