= Iwayadō Castle =

Hilltop castle in Ōshū, Iwate Prefecture, Japan

Iwayadō Castle (岩谷堂城, Iwayadō-jō), also known as Shakuchi Castle, is a hirayamashiro (平山城) (hilltop castle) located in Ōshū, Iwate Prefecture, Japan. During the eleventh century in the late Heian period, Fujiwara no Tsunekiyo and his son Fujiwara no Kiyohira were the lords of the castle. Today, most of the castle is in ruins, and Hachiman Shrine, Iwayadō Elementary School, and Iwayadō High School stand on the site.
