= Ōe no Masafusa =

Japanese poet and scholar (1041-1111)

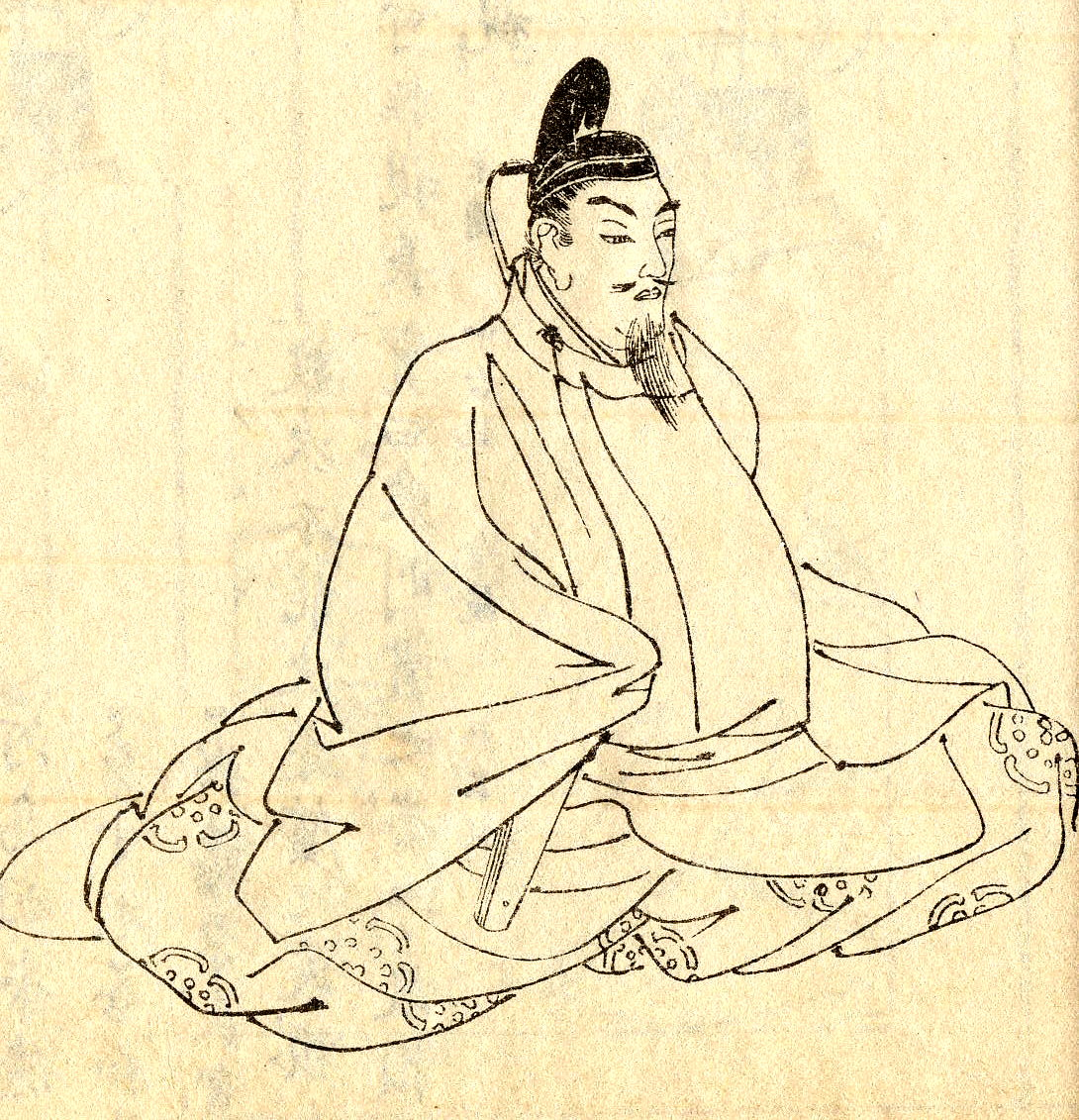
An image of Ōe no Masafusa drawn in the 19th century, by Kikuchi Yōsai.

Ōe no Masafusa (大江 匡房; 1041-1111) was a poet, scholar and tutor under the emperors of Shirakawa, Horikawa, and Toba. Masafusa was most known by his title of "Acting Middle Counselor". In 1060 AD, Masafusa became mainly known for being the author of the famous work: Gōke Shidai. For the ceremonial and public functions in the eleventh century, this became one of the most valuable sources of historic information. During the year of 1111, Masafusa died at the age of 71.

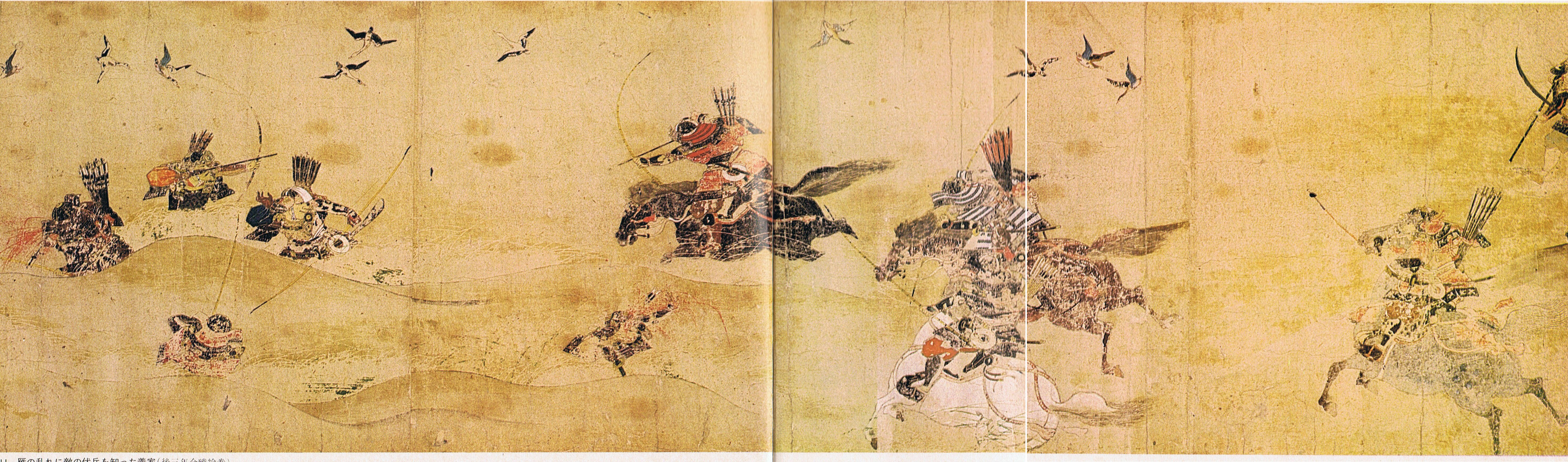
Gosannen War Picture Scroll" Based on the soldier book learned from Ōe no Masafusa, Minamoto no Yoshiie learned of the enemy's ambush from the disorder of the row of geese and shot and killed them.

One of his students in the art of war was Minamoto no Yoshiie.

Masafusa authored a number of texts, including:

- Gōke Shidai (江家次第) (early 12th century)
- Gōto Tokugan Monshū (江都督願文集) (mid to late 11th century)
- Yūjoki (遊女記)
- Kairaishiki (傀儡子記)
- Rakuyō Dengakuki (洛陽田楽記)
- Zoku Honchō Ōjōden (続本朝往生伝)
- Gōdanshō (江談抄)
- Rōei gōchū (朗詠江註; a commentary to Fujiwara no Kintō's Wakan rōeishū)
- Honchō shinsenden (本朝神仙伝)

== Ancestry ==
His paternal great grandparents were Ōe no Masahira (大江匡衡) and Akazome Emon, Masahira himself being a grandson of Ōe no Koretoki (大江維時). Koretoki was a son of Ōe no Chifuru (大江千古) and grandson of Ōe no Otondo. Otondo was a son of Prince Abo, who was a son of Emperor Heizei.
