= Abe no Sadato =

Samurai during the Heian period of Japan

Abe no Sadatō 安倍 貞任
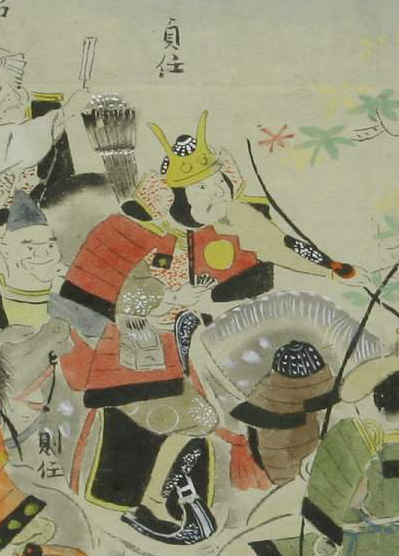
- Born: 1019
- Died: 1062 (aged 42–43)
- Allegiance: Abe clan
- Branch: Samurai
- Conflicts: battle of Kawasaki

Abe no Sadatō (安倍 貞任; 1019 – October 22, 1062) was a samurai during the Heian period of Japan. In the Zenkunen War, Sadato fought alongside his father against the Minamoto.

== Life ==
Sadatō was born in 1019, to the Abe clan, as the son of Abe no Yoritoki, the chinjufu-shōgun (general in charge of overseeing the Ainu and the defense of the north).

Minamoto no Yoriyoshi and his son Yoshiie came to the Abes' northern province of Mutsu to restore power over the province to the Governor; Abe no Yoritoki, Sadatō's father, had been acting beyond his station. As a result, the two clans fought for roughly nine years, with some truces, over the course of a total of twelve years from 1051 to 1063.

Sadatō's father was killed in 1057, and so he became head of the clan and head of the military effort against the Minamoto. He fought them in the battle of Kawasaki, in a snowstorm, defeated them and pursued them through the blizzard for a short time. Other battles followed, during which Sadatō's attacks, along with the harsh weather and terrain, weakened his enemies. However, in 1062, the Minamoto received reinforcements, and Sadato faced them for the last time. He came under siege in a fortress on the Kuriyagawa, and after several days of fighting, his water supply diverted, his defenses attacked, and his fortress set aflame, Sadato surrendered. The Minamoto returned to Kyoto the following year, carrying his head.

== Appearance ==
Hiroaki Sato has described him, "He was more than six feet tall, the circumference of his waist is seven feet and four inches. He had an extraordinary face, his skin was white, and he was fat."

== Genealogy ==
Famed director Akira Kurosawa claimed in his autobiography to be a descendant of Abe no Sadatō.
