= Abe no Yoritoki =

Emishi clan leader

Abe no Yoritoki 安倍 頼時
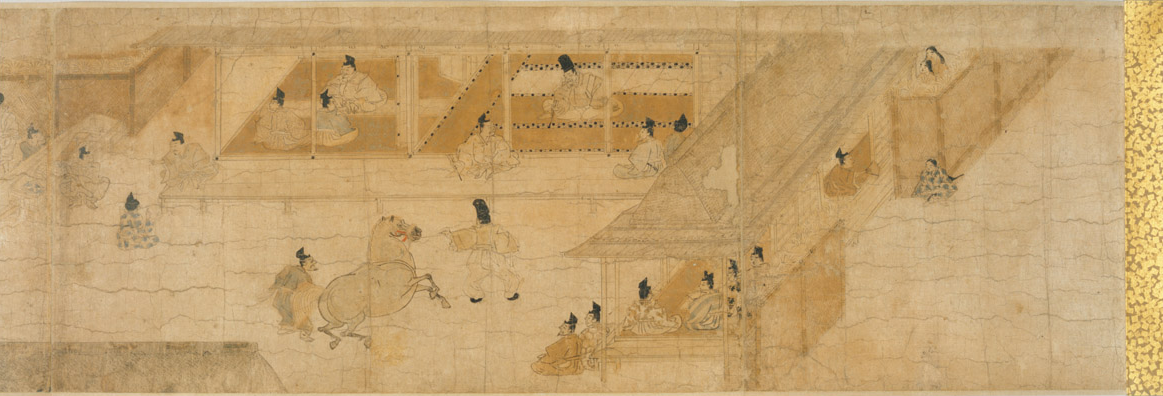
- Born: c. 1011
- Died: 1057
- Relatives: Son: Abe no Sadato
- Military career
- Allegiance: Abe clan
- Rank: Chinjufu Shogun

Abe no Yoritoki (安倍頼時) (died 28 August 1057) was the head of the Abe clan of Emishi who were allowed to rule the six Emishi districts (Iwate, Hienuki, Shiwa, Isawa, Esashi and Waga) in the Kitakami Basin from Morioka to Hiraizumi in what is now Iwate Prefecture.

== Background ==
The clan emerged from the Appi River basin in what is now Hachimantai City, Iwate Prefecture, early in the 9th century. They provided a number of generals and governors throughout the 9th and 10th centuries. By monopolizing the gold, iron and horse trade in northern Honshū the family became enormously wealthy. They were also innovative in designing a new type of stockade which could withstand a long siege.

The 9th and 10th centuries saw a weakening of central power as a new land management system of tax-immune estates, or shoen, took hold.

== Campaign ==
Yoritoki and the Abes came into conflict with the Minamoto clan as it began to expand north into Abe territory. The Abe clan began to raid territories south of their border. In 1051 Yoritoki led an army of Emishi into northern Miyagi and defeated a government army at Onikiribe that had been sent to stop the raids. This event triggered the Former Nine Years' War (Zenkunen War).

Minamoto no Yoriyoshi was then deputized as the new Chinjufu Shogun and sent to chastise Yoritoki in 1053. In 1056 Yoritoki's eldest son, Sadato, began skirmishing with the Minamotos. War erupted in 1057 and Yoritoki was killed in battle by a stray arrow.

Yoritoki's sons continued fighting for a time but were finally overwhelmed by combined Minamoto and Kiyowara armies in 1062.

== Legacy ==
Yoritoki was the father of:

- Abe no Sadato (1019–1062), who occupied the Kuriyagawa Stockade;
- Abe no Munetō (1032–1108), who was based at the Isawa Stockade;
- Abe no Masato, who occupied the Kurosawa Stockade;
- Abe no Norito, who stayed at the Koromo Stockade with his father;
- a daughter, who married Taira no Nagahira;
- a daughter, who married Fujiwara no Tsunekiyo. Through this daughter, Yoritoki became the grandfather of Fujiwara no Kiyohira, the founder of the Northern Fujiwara dynasty.

Yoritoki is also one of the distant forefathers of Shinzō Abe, the former prime minister of Japan, through Munetō.
