= Kokon Chomonjū =

Kokon Chomonjū (古今著聞集), lit. A Collection of Notable Tales Old and New, is a Kamakura-period collection of setsuwa. It was compiled by Tachibana Narisue (橘成季) and completed in 1254. The twenty volumes are divided by subject into thirty chapters: chapter 16 concerns art and painting and 17 kemari or "kickball". Of the 726 tales, nearly two-thirds are set in the Heian period. In a note between tales 721 and 722, Narisue states that "the original aim of this collection was to collect fine stories about music and poems, and depict them as if in paintings".
