= Gosannen War =

11th century war in Honshu, Japan

- Part of Clan disputes of the Heian period
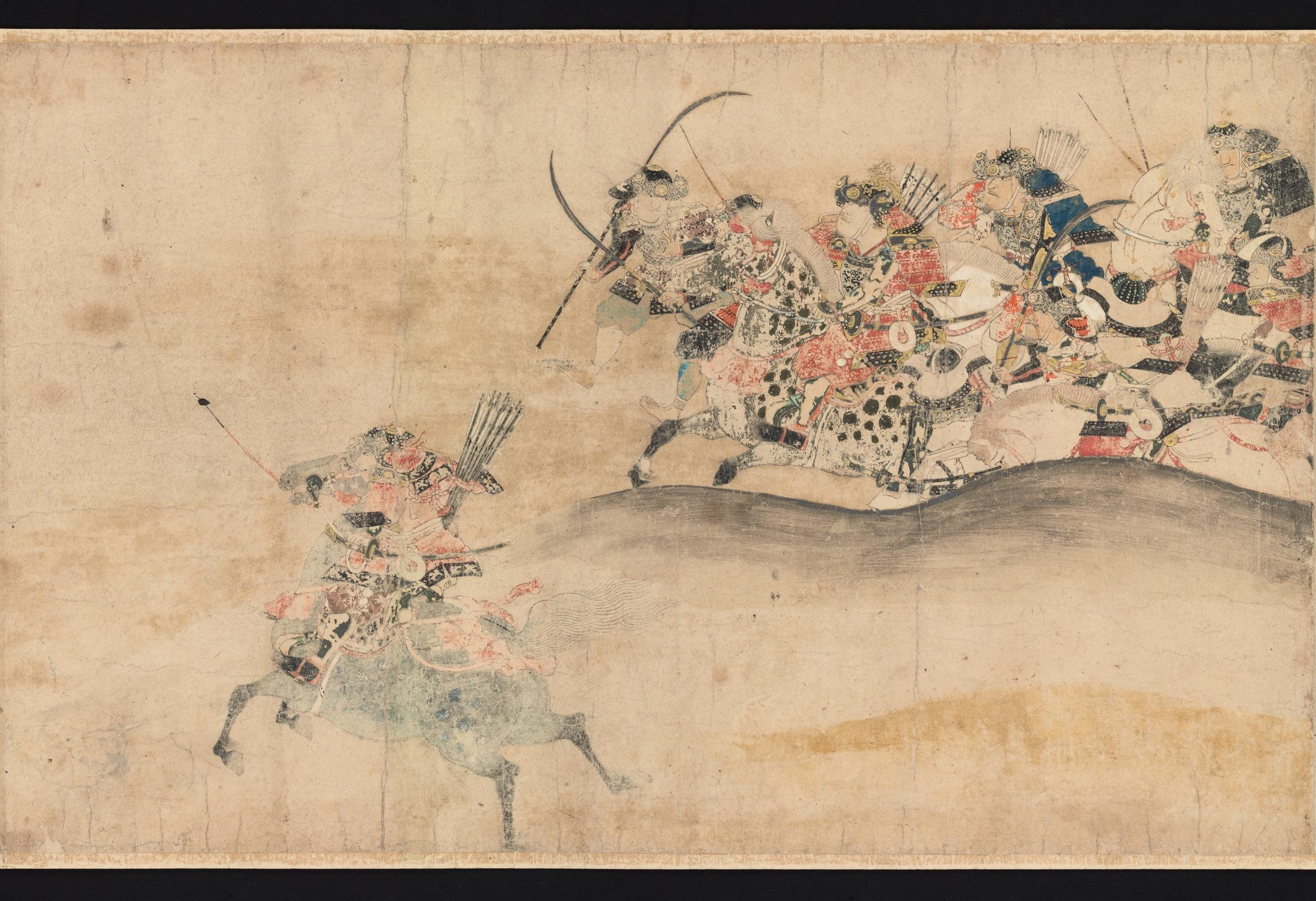
Date	1083–1089 (disputed)
Location	Mutsu province, Tōhoku region, Japan
Result	Military stalemate

Belligerents
Forces of various branches of Kiyohara clan	Forces of Minamoto no Yoshiie; Governor of Mutsu province

Commanders and leaders
Kiyohara no Iehira; Kiyohara no Takahira; Others	Minamoto no Yoshiie; Fujiwara no Kiyohira

The Gosannen War (後三年合戦, gosannen kassen), also known as the Later Three-Year War, was fought in the late 1080s in Japan's Mutsu Province on the island of Honshū.

== History ==
The Gosannen War was part of a long struggle for power within the warrior clans of the time.

The Gosannen kassen arose because of a series of quarrels within the Kiyohara clan (sometimes referred to as "Kiyowara"). The long-standing disturbances were intractable. Minamoto no Yoshiie, who became Governor of Mutsu province in 1083, tried to calm the fighting which continued between Kiyohara no Masahira, Iehira, and Narihira.

Negotiations were not successful; and so Yoshiie used his own forces to stop the fighting. He was helped by Fujiwara no Kiyohira. In the end, Iehira and Narihira were killed.

During the siege of Kanezawa, 1086–1089, Yoshiie avoided an ambush by noticing a flock of birds take flight from a forest.

== In art ==
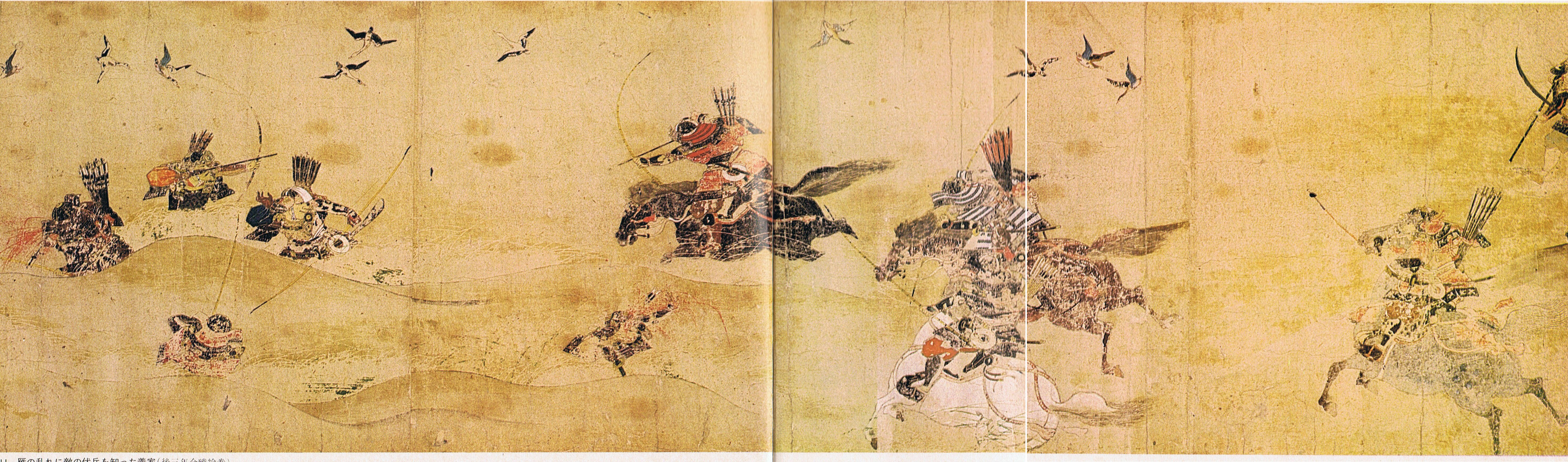
Handscroll illustrating the Gosannen War of the 11th century

Much of the war is depicted in an e-maki narrative handscroll, the Gosannen kassen emaki, which was created in 1171. A copy of the work is owned today by the Watanabe Museum in Tottori city, Japan, the original having been lost.

== See also ==
- Kamakura Gongorō Kagemasa
- Zenkunen War
