= Abe clan =

Major Japanese clan

Abe 安倍
- Home province: Iga; Mutsu; Dewa
- Titles: Various
- Founder: Prince Ōhiko
- Cadet branches: Tsuchimikado family

The Abe clan (安倍氏, Abe-shi) was one of the oldest of the major Japanese clans (uji); and the clan retained its prominence during the Sengoku period and the Edo period. The clan's origin is said to be one of the original clans of the Yamato people; they truly gained prominence during the Heian period (794–1185), and experienced a resurgence in the 18th century. Although Abe is also a very common Japanese surname in modern times, not everyone with this name is descended from this clan.

== Origins and history ==
According to the Nihon Shoki, the Abe were descended from Prince Ōhiko, son of Emperor Kōgen. They originated in Iga province (today Mie prefecture); Though the clan name was originally written as 阿倍, it changed to 安倍 around the 8th century. Though this origin is not positive, it is likely.

The northern region which would come to be known as the provinces of Mutsu and Dewa, was conquered by the Japanese sometime in the 9th century, and the native Emishi people there subjugated or displaced. While many provinces at this time were overseen primarily by a governor, Mutsu saw to the rise of independent families called gōzoku which administered local affairs. The Abe were appointed as "Superintendent of the Aborigines" ostensibly to control the local people who by now were a mix of Japanese immigrants and former Emishi tribesmen on behalf of the central government, but in reality the government in Kyōto simply did not have control over the region, and was recognizing this fact by appointing the Abe. The Abe for their part used their position to take control over the so-called six districts roku-oku-gun located in what is now central Iwate prefecture surrounding the Kitakami river. In time, they began to have disputes with the governor of Mutsu, an office held by a branch of the Fujiwara family, which erupted into violence in 1051.

The main reason given for the attack on the Abe was that they stopped paying taxes to Kyoto, and stopped contributing to the local government. The governors of Mutsu and the commander of Dewa fort combined their forces to attack the Abe, but were defeated. Desperate to quell this affront to their authority Kyōto appointed Minamoto Yoriyoshi as Chinjufu-shōgun. The position known as Chinjufu-shōgun, or "Commander-in-chief of the Defense of the North", was traditionally given by the court as a temporary appointment to a courtier (typically of high rank) who was appointed as a national general to quell uprisings among the Emishi or Ebisu barbarians of northern Honshū. Increasingly, as military power became privatized, this position was rotated among a few clans.

In what has come to be termed the "Earlier Nine Years' War" (前九年合戦, Zenkunen kassen), Abe Yoritoki was killed, and his son Abe no Sadato defeated, by Minamoto no Yoriyoshi and his son, Minamoto no Yoshiie. This war broke the power of the Abe family, but in the prolonged fighting that took place the Minamoto would not have prevailed had it not been for the aid of another powerful family, the Kiyowara. The Kiyowara clan of nearby Dewa province, aided the Minamoto in defeating the Abe.

=== Other Abe families ===
Though many other major figures throughout history have been called Abe, it is difficult to know which were related to the ancient Abe clan, the Abe clan of Mutsu, the Abe clan of Mikawa, or the Abe clan of Shinano, which were recognized as separate family groups during the Edo period. Abe no Nakamaro, a major court noble of the 8th century, for example, was from the town of Abe, near Nara, and derived his family name thus.

The aristocratic Tsuchimikado family, descended from Abe no Seimei, survived into the Meiji era and were considered the heirs to the main Abe clan line despite having a different name.

A family by the name of Abe also proved significant during the Edo period, serving successively in the post of Rōjū, or Elders, who advised the Tokugawa shōgun. Again, it is difficult to determine whether or not this line was directly related to either of the earlier Abe clans. Abe Tadaaki was the second to serve as Rōjū, holding the post from 1633 to 1671. He was very likely a son or other direct relation to Abe Masatsugu (1569–1647) who served Tokugawa Ieyasu and fought under him at the decisive battle of Sekigahara. Other members of the Abe family would succeed Tadaaki to the post for much of the Edo period (1603–1867), ending with Abe Masahiro, who was chief of the Council of Rōjū at the time of the arrival of Commodore Perry.

It is believed that prime minister Shinzo Abe was a 41st generation descendant of the Heian era samurai Abe no Yoritoki through his son Abe no Munetō. This line with ties to the historic Mutsu Province was originally believed to be unrelated to the main Abe clan line, however recent studies suggest the Satō–Kishi–Abe family and the Ōshū line may indeed be distant relations of the main clan line (but were a considered a separate clan during the Edo era).

The Abe clan of Shinano(jp) however, claim descent from Shiga Yoshisato and are considered unrelated to any of the other Abe clans.

== Clan members of note ==
- Abe no Hirafu (c. 575–664), also known as Abe no Ōmi, one of the leading generals in the subjugation of the Emishi
- Abe no Yoritoki (died 1057) - Chinjufu-shōgun during the Zenkunen War
- Abe no Sadato (1019–62)
- Abe Masatsugu (1569–1647) - fought at Sekigahara, became a fudai daimyō under the Tokugawa, first Abe clan member of the Rōjū
- Abe Tadaaki - second Abe clan member of the Rōjū
- Abe Masahiro - among the last of the Rōjū, signed Treaty of Kanagawa
- Abe no Seimei - famed practitioner of onmyōdō
- Shinzo Abe - Prime Minister of Japan of Japan
