= Fujiwara no Kiyohira =

Samurai and founder of the Northern Fujiwara dynasty

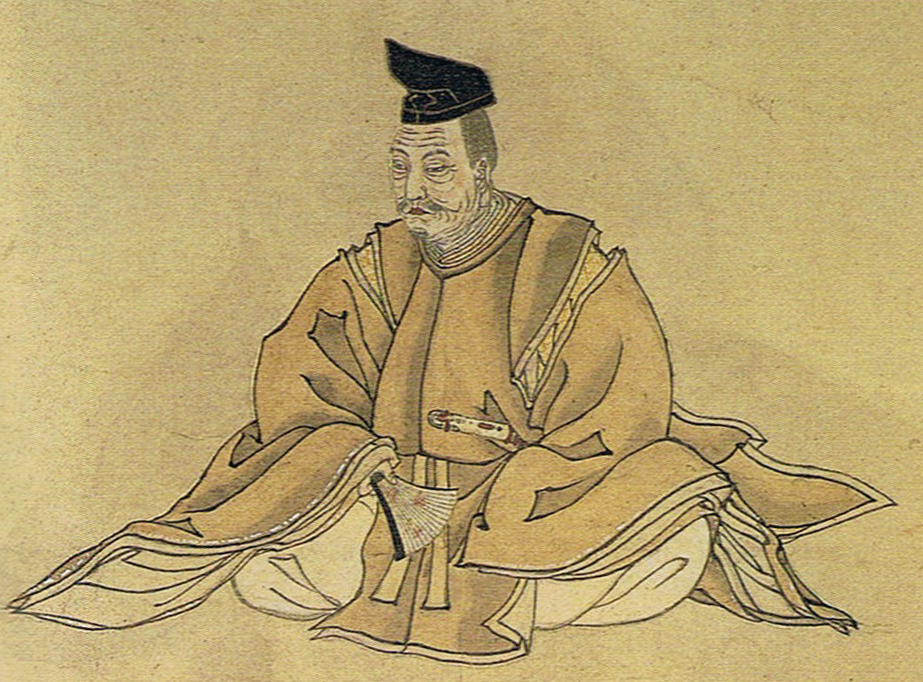
Fujiwara no Kiyohira

Fujiwara no Kiyohira (藤原 清衡; 1056 – August 10, 1128) was a samurai of mixed Japanese–Emishi parentage active during the late Heian period (794–1185). He was the founder of the Hiraizumi or Northern Fujiwara dynasty that ruled Northern Japan from about 1100 to 1189.

== Biography ==
Kiyohira was the son of Fujiwara no Tsunekiyo and a daughter of Abe no Yoritoki whose name is not known. He was born somewhere in the Kitakami Basin in 1056. His father was of the Hidesato branch of the Fujiwara clan which was known for their fighting ability. Even so, Tsunekiyo was a mid-level bureaucrat at Fort Taga in present-day Sendai, Miyagi Prefecture when he married his Emishi wife, left his position and went to live with his wife's family in present-day Iwate Prefecture. Thus, Kiyohira was born in an Emishi household in Emishi territory to a father who was considered a traitor by the Japanese authorities.

Much of his early life was spent in a community at war with the Japanese central authorities. The Earlier Nine Years' War (Zenkunen War, 前九年合戦) was fought on and off from 1050 to 1062 while the Latter Three Years' War (Gosannen War, 後三年合戦) ran from 1083 to 1087. He lost his grandfather, Abe no Yoritoki, in battle in 1057, his uncle Sadato in 1062 and all of his mother's brothers were deported to Kyūshū in the same year. His own father was personally beheaded by Minamoto no Yoriyoshi (源 頼義) with a blunt sword. These are the events which would shape his life and influence his decisions as long as he lived.

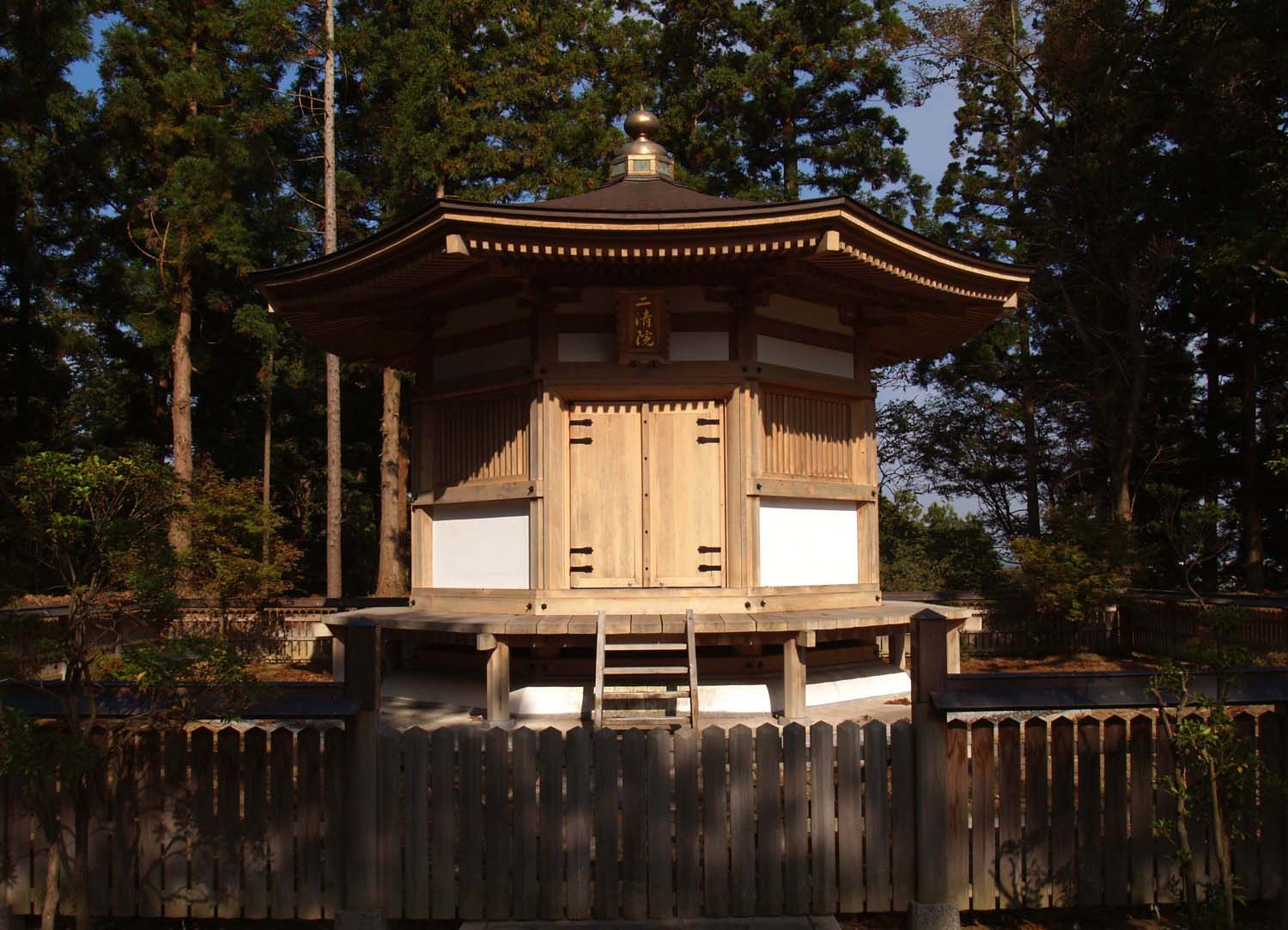
This modern building houses statues of Fujiwara no Kiyohira and his father Tsunekiyo. It is at Fort Toyota (Iwayadō Castle) in Oshu City

After he lost his father during the Zenkunen War, his mother became the concubine of his enemy, Kiyohara no Takehira, who had helped Minamoto no Yoriyoshi in the last war. Kiyohira was brought up in this enemy clan as Kiyohara no Kiyohira, with his elder stepbrother Sanehira and younger half-brother Iehira. The Later Three Years' War involved a struggle among the three brothers in this complex relationship.

Kiyohira won the final victory in the war in 1087, with the aid of Minamoto no Yoshiie (源 義家), the son of another of his old enemies, Minamoto no Yoriyoshi. Kiyohira, however, lost his wife and son during the war, killed by his half-brother Iehira.

Victorious in the Latter Three Years' War, Kiyohira returned to his home at Fort Toyota (Iwayadō Castle), in present-day Esashi Ward, Ōshū City, Iwate prefecture, to plan his future. Sometime around 1090 to 1100 he built a new home on Mount Kanzan, "Barrier Mountain" in what is now Hiraizumi Town. There appear to be three main reasons for his choice of site. First was its location directly on the Frontier Way, the main highway leading south to the capital and other major cities and north to the lands he controlled. Secondly it was determined to be the center of their realm, Ōshū, as measured from the Shirakawa Barrier in the south to Sotogahama in present-day Aomori Prefecture in the north. Thirdly this location is on the Southern side of the Koromo River, in what had traditionally been Japanese territory. Previously Emishi forts were always built on the North side of East or West flowing rivers.

There is evidence that Kiyohira did not use the name Fujiwara but the name Kiyohara until 1117, when he was more than 60 years old. But he did use it and passed it on to his children. Kiyohira had several wives and consorts, including a Taira wife from Kyōto who was called the mother of his six children. She seems to have tired quickly of life on the remote frontier, returned to Kyōto, married a policeman and never returned. He is also known to have had two Emishi wives, a Kiyohara and an Abe. His eldest son and rightful heir was Koretsune. His second son and eventual successor was Motohira, born about 1105, likely to one of Kiyohira's Emishi wives.

After setting up house in Hiraizumi, Kiyohira began a Buddhist temple building program on the top of Mount Kanzan, Chūson-ji. This complex of temples, pagodas, repositories and gardens was to be his legacy, the embodiment of his vision for himself, his family and his domain for all time.

Preceded by None	Northern Fujiwara family head 1089–1128	Succeeded by Fujiwara no Motohira
