= Former Nine Years' War =

11th-century war in Japan

Zenkunen War
- Part of Clan disputes of the Heian period
Date	1051–1062
Location	Mutsu province, Tohoku region, Japan
Result	Imperial victory

Belligerents
Imperial Court	Abe clan

Commanders and leaders
Minamoto no Yoriyoshi; Minamoto no Yoshiie	Abe no Yoritoki; Abe no Sadato

The Zenkunen War (前九年の役, Zenkunen no Eki), also known in English as the Former Nine Years' War or the Early Nine Years' War, was fought between the Imperial Court and the Abe clan in Mutsu Province, in Northeast Japan, from 1051 to 1062. It resulted in Imperial Court victory and the surrender of Abe no Sadato. Like the other major conflicts of the Heian period, such as the Gosannen War and the Genpei War, the Zenkunen war was a struggle for power within the samurai clans.

== Background ==
While most provinces were overseen by just a Governor, Mutsu, in what is now the Tohoku region, had a military general in charge of controlling the Emishi natives, who had been subjugated when the Japanese took over the area in the ninth century. Historically, this post was always held by a member of the Abe clan, and there were many conflicts between the Abe general and the Governor over administrative control of the province.

In 1050, the general overseeing the Emishi was Abe no Yoritoki, who levied taxes and confiscated property on his own, rarely paying any heed to the wishes of the province's Governor. The Governor sent word to the capital in Kyoto asking for help, and as a result Minamoto no Yoriyoshi was appointed both Governor and commander-in-chief over controlling the natives. He was sent with his son Yoshiie, then age fifteen, to stop Abe.

== War ==
The fighting lasted for twelve years, or nine if one subtracts short periods of ceasefire and peace. Skirmishes were fierce and many, but few major battles were fought until the Battle of Kawasaki in 1057. Abe no Yoritoki had been killed shortly before, and the Minamoto were now fighting his son, Abe no Sadato, who defeated them at Kawasaki and pursued them through a blizzard.

The government forces, led by the Minamoto, had much trouble for quite some time, due to the harsh terrain and weather, but were eventually reinforced with new troops, including many offered by the Governor, a member of the Kiyohara clan, of the nearby Dewa Province. In 1062, Minamoto no Yoriyoshi, along with his son, led an assault on an Abe fortress at Siege of Kuriyagawa. They diverted the water supply, stormed the earthworks and stockade, and set the fortress aflame. After two days of fighting, Sadato surrendered.

== Legacy ==
Minamoto no Yoshiie is thus considered the founder of the Minamoto clan's great martial legacy, and is worshiped as a particularly special and powerful ancestor kami of the clan. As a kami and a legend, he is often called Hachimantarō, "Son of Hachiman".

A famous renga from the Kokon Chomonjū was exchanged between Sadato and Yoshiie when Sadato was forced to flee his castle on the Koromo River. Yoshiie said, Koromo no tate wa hokorobinikeri, Koromo Castle has been destroyed ("The warps of your robe have come undone"), to which Sadato replied, toshi o heshi ito no midare no kurushisa ni, "over the years its threads became tangled, and this pains me."
