= Ibaraki-dōji =

Oni (demon or ogre) from Japanese legend

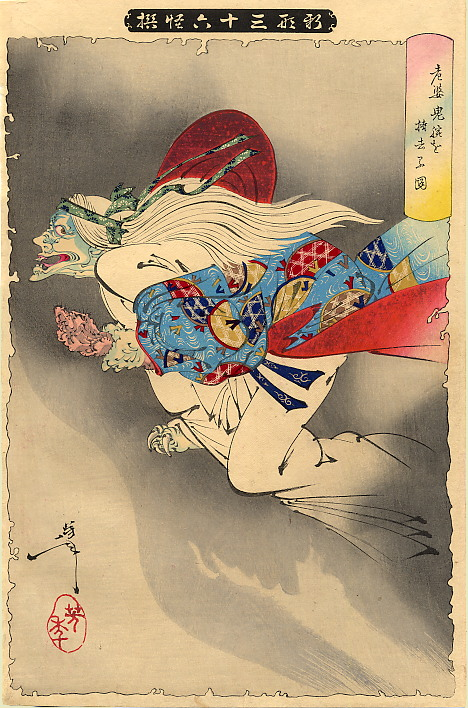
"Rōba Oni Ude wo Mochisaru Zu" (Depiction of an Old Woman Taking Away the Oni's Arm) from the Shinkei Sanjūrokkaisen by Tsukioka Yoshitoshi. It depicts Ibaraki-dōji shapeshifting into the form of Watanabe no Tsuna's aunt in order to steal back the arm.

Ibaraki-dōji (茨木童子 or 茨城童子 "Ibaraki child") is an oni (demon or ogre) featured in tales of the Heian period. In the tales, Ibaraki-dōji is based on Mount Ōe, and once went on a rampage in Kyoto. The "Ibaraki" in his name may refer to Ibaraki, Osaka; "dōji" means "child", but in this context is a demon offspring. Ibaraki-dōji was the most important servant of Shuten-dōji.

As for the birthplace, there are theories that it may be Settsu Province (Mio, Ibaraki, Osaka, and Tomatsu, Amagasaki, Hyōgo) or Echigo Province (Niigata, formerly Tochio, now a settlement in Karuizawa, Nagano). Ibaraki-dōji had teeth since birth, and was feared for being a giant. After they became an oni, they met Shuten-dōji and became his subordinate, and together they aimed for the capital. Their gender is ambiguous, in some stories Ibaraki is a kijo (female oni), and in others a male. The female version is theorized to be Shuten-dōji’s lover, son, or his son's lover.

The Shuten-dōji gang was based on Mt. Ōe (said to be in Tanba Province, but there are also theories that it may have been at Mt. Ōe, at the boundary between Kyoto and Kameoka). The gang ran amok in the capital, kidnapping families’ girls among other things, but they were destroyed by Minamoto no Yorimitsu and his four vassals, the Four Guardian Kings. However, Ibaraki-dōji was able to escape.

According to the legend, Watanabe no Tsuna cut Ibaraki Doji's arm with a tachi named 'Higekiri'. At present, Kitano Tenmangū Shrine owns a tachi 'Onikirimaru' (鬼切丸) (Note: 'Onikirimaru' has the same name as the sword owned by Tada Shrine, but they are different swords.) handed down as 'Higekiri', which is also called 'Onikiri', 'Onimaru' (Note: 'Onimaru' has the same name as 'Onimaru' of Tenka-Goken, but they are different swords.), 'Shishinoko' or 'Tomokiri' based on various legends.

== Birth ==
=== Echigo theory ===
There is a theory that, just like Shuten-dōji, Ibaraki-dōji was also born at Echigo. Born at the Sunagodzuka in Ganbara (now Niigata, Tsubame, Sunagodzuka), Ibaraki-dōji was a page at the Kokojou-ji, but since Ibaraki-dōji was born in Karuizawa in the mountain recesses of the Koshi District (now Niigata, Nagaoka, Karuizawa), Ibaraki-dōji was given to the Yahiko-jinja. That place is where Ibaraki-dōji and Shuten-dōji engaged in sumo, and there is a small shrine enshrining Ibaraki-dōji. In that same area, family name "Ibaraki" is common, and there is a legend that those of the Ibaraki family have a customary practice of not wrapping beans on the last day of winter according to the traditional Japanese calendar, and that a delinquent will come of the family if they make a gable on their roofs, which is why they do not make them.

As a beautiful boy, he received a mountain load of love letters from girls who knew him just like Shuten-dōji. Also, he wooed many females. His mother, anxious about his future, sent him to Yahiko-jinja. However, when, one time, he left the Yahiko-jinja to return to his home, his mother found a "love letter smeared with blood" hidden in his luggage. Upon licking that blood once with his finger, his appearance at once turned into that of an oni; and following the beam, broke the gable, and fled. At that time, Shuten-dōji heard about a girl who died from pessimism from not receiving a reply to her love letter, and upon opening a tsuzura within the letter, a strange smoke started rising, that he lost his consciousness, and before he knew it, became an oni, and thus fled the shrine and went about to reach the extremes of evil.

Ibaraki-dōji, finding sympathy for each other with Shuten-dōji, became his underling, and attacked the surrounding villages together, but when his mother heard that rumor, she stood in front of Ibaraki-dōji wearing his clothes he had as a newborn. Perhaps as a result of suddenly recovering his memories of his childhood, he promised not to tread that land again, went to Togakushi, Shinano and other places, and aimed for the capital.

=== Settsu theory ===
Concerning Shuten-dōji, there are stories that he was born at the base of Mount Ibuki among other famous stories, but concerning Ibaraki-dōji, there are stories that he was born in Amagasaki, Hyōgo, and Ibaraki, Osaka among other places, and documented from various sources such as the Settsu Meisho Zue (摂津名所図会), Settsuyou Kendan (摂陽研説), and Settsuyou Gundan (摂陽群談). In the Settsuyou Gundan of 1701, he was born at the village of Tomatsu in Settsu (now Amagasaki, Hyōgo), was thrown away at the village of Ibaraki (Ibaraki city), was picked up by Shuten-dōji, given the name Ibaraki, and raised.

Also, in the Settsuyou Kendan, Ibaraki-dōji was a native of Matsumura, Kawanabe (Tomatsu, or a part of the city of Amagasaki), but was born with fangs and long hair and a glint in his eye, and power that was greater than that of grown-ups, that his family was fearful of him, and left him around Ibaraki town, Shimashimo, and then picked up by Shuten-dōji.

According to the legend in Ibaraki city, Ibaraki-dōji was born in the town of Mizuo (now Ibaraki city), but after a difficult delivery after 18 months, he had already grown teeth, and was immediately able to walk after being born, and laughed with sharp eyes upon looking at his mother, causing his mother to die of shock. The oni-like child was too much for his father, so he was thrown away in front of a kamiyui in Kuzugami forest at the town of Ibaraki, and was then raised by the lady of the barbershop, who did not have a child. Ibaraki-dōji, who excelled over adults at strength and physique at a young age, was also too much for the barbershop, but was taught the job at the barbershop and was able to be settled down. However, one day, Ibaraki-dōji injured a customer's face with a razor, had his hands stained in blood in fright, and tried licking his fingers clean but got used to the taste of blood. From then on he intentionally injured customers' faces and drank their blood. Having angered the barber shop, the despondent Ibaraki-dōji leaned against a bridge over a brook and hung down his head in shame, and, having noticed how his face reflected in the water had completely become that of an oni, did not return to the barber shop. He fled north to a mountain in Tanba, and before long met Shuten-dōji and became his servant. That bridge was called "Ibaraki-dōji Sugatami-bashi" but no longer exists, and there is a monument with an inscription at its former site.

== Mt. Ōoe massacre ==
The damage caused by Shuten-dōji's gang was so large that Minamoto no Yorimitsu went to exterminate oni, and his subordinates, the Four Guardian Kings, and his friend, went to Mt. Ōoe. Dressed as mountain priests, his party received help from various people, and pretending to request lodging, successfully got to Shuten-dōji's stronghold. That evening, they roused up a drinking banquet, and deep in the night, Shuten-dōji, so drunk that he was unable to move and his oni were all exterminated. However, Ibaraki-dōji, when fighting with Watanabe no Tsuna, saw Shuten-dōji get exterminated, and not wanting to be exterminated, retreated, and was the only one who was able to flee.

== Watanabe no Tsuna ==
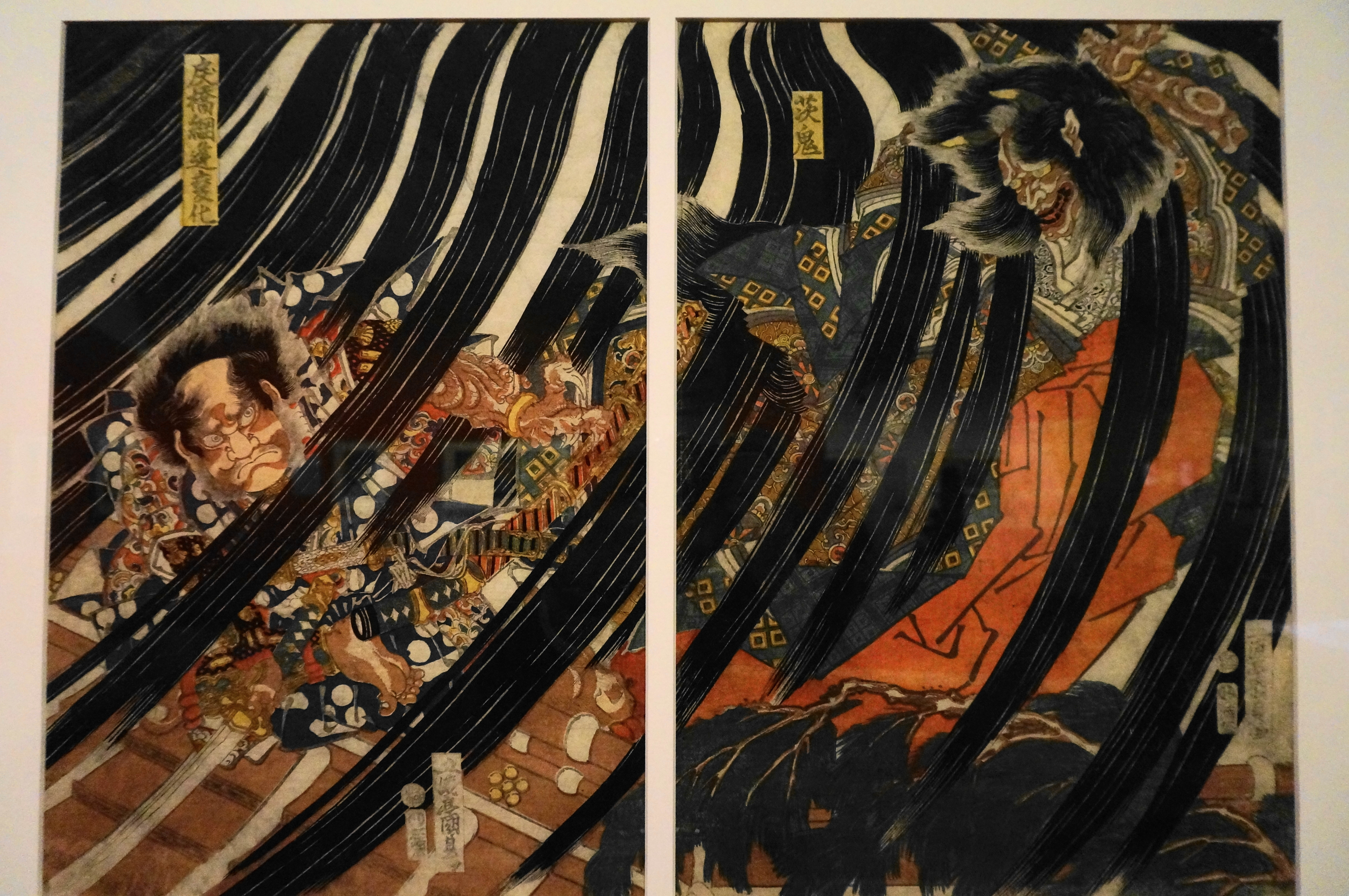
"Watanabe no Tsuna meets Ibaraki-dōji at Modoribashi Bridge." Ukiyo-e print by Utagawa Kunisada.

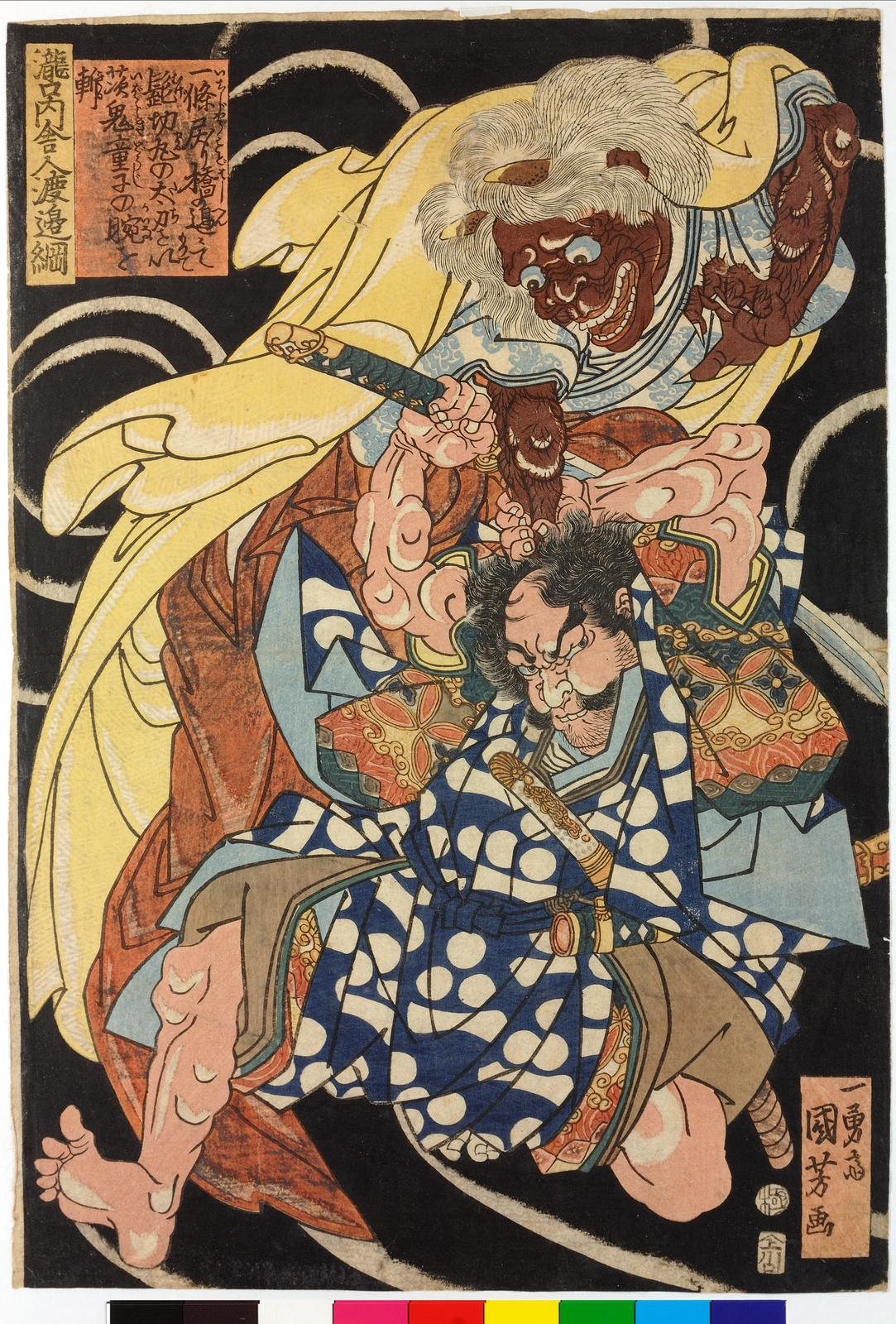
Ukiyo-e by Utagawa Kuniyoshi depicting Watanabe no Tsuna cutting Ibaraki-dōji's arm at Rajōmon.

The legend of Watanabe no Tsuna and Ibaraki-dōji comes from the following works:

- Genpei Jōsuiki
- Taiheiki
- The Tale of the Heike: Tsurugi no Maki
- Zentaiheiki

And also appears in:

- Ibaraki (茨木) (a kabuki play)
- Modori-hashi(戻橋) (a kabuki play)
- Otogi-zōshi
- Rashōmon (a Noh play)
- Tsunayakata (綱館) (a nagauta)

In all of these appearances, there are slight differences in the story. The general outline is: "Watanabe no Tsuna was able to cut off one of Ibaraki-dōji's arms, but Ibaraki-dōji went to Tsuna to retrieve the arm."

=== Ichijō Modorihashi ===
In many versions of the stories, Ibaraki-dōji would appear on Ichijō Modorihashi (一条戻橋). A young beautiful girl was on the road, worried, so Watanabe no Tsuna made her ride on a horse, but the girl suddenly transformed into an oni, and grasped Tsuna’s hair, flew in the air, and took him to Mount Atago. Tsuna, not panicked at all, cut off the oni's arm, averting disaster.

Tsuna showed the oni's arm to Minamoto no Yorimitsu. Yorimitsu consulted with an onmyoji (there are versions where it was Abe no Seimei), who said that "the oni will surely come for its arm, so confine yourself in your house for seven days, and don't let anyone in the house for that time". Several days after that, Ibaraki-dōji tried to invade Tsuna's estate using the remaining arm, but due to the power of a Humane King Sutra and a talisman, Ibaraki-dōji was not able to enter.

Finally, on the evening of the seventh night, on Settsu, Tsuna's aunt, Mashiba (there are also versions where it was not his aunt, but his foster mother) came to Tsuna's estate. Tsuna told the circumstances, and said that his aunt definitely cannot come in, but the old aunt grieved, "from a young age, I raised you with great care, and my reward is this kind of treatment?" and by that, Tsuna disobeyed his instructions, and let his aunt into his estate. However, his aunt was, in reality, Ibaraki-dōji in disguise. While still in his aunt's appearance, Ibaraki-dōji expressed desire to see the arm that Tsuna cut off from the oni, and after carefully looking at the arm taken out of its seal within a box, suddenly turned back into an oni's appearance. Ibaraki-dōji, holding the arm, flew up in the air, broke the gable, and disappeared in the distance in the sky.

=== Rashōmon ===
The story of Watanabe no Tsuna cutting off Ibaraki-dōji's arm has a variation including Rashōmon gate of Kyoto.

When the Mt. Ōoe oni extermination ended and everything calmed back down, in the location where Minamoto no Yorimitsu and his Four Guardian Kings gathered together a drinking banquet, there have recently been stories that oni have been appearing in Rashōmon.

1. When they were all doing a test of courage, when it became Tsuna’s turn, he went into the door, and met an oni, and as a result of battle, cut off the oni's arm.
2. Tsuna, who did not think that there was a survivor among the oni, went to see Rashōmon, where there was Ibaraki-dōji (or a beautiful girl who was Ibaraki-dōji in disguise), and as a result of battle, he cut off an arm.

Afterwards, in the same way, Ibaraki-dōji changed appearance, and appeared to take back the arm.

== Aftermath ==
After retrieving the arm, Ibaraki-dōji's whereabouts are not definite. According to the folk tale in Settsu, there are stories where Ibaraki-dōji went back home, and also stories where Ibaraki-dōji went back home but was chased away.

== In fiction ==
Ibaraki-dōji appears in Type-Moon's Fate franchise as a Berserker (original form) or Lancer (Summer event) class Servant in their mobile game Fate/Grand Order.

The Touhou Project game franchise goes with a female version of Ibaraki. The mysterious hermit Kasen Ibaraki is the protagonist of Touhou Ibarakasen ~ Wild and Horned Hermit. Her story features elements from the original myth, including a story arc centered around her arm.

The 2018 mobile game Onmyoji by Netease features a character resembling Ibaraki Dōuji as a fearsome Oni, available as a playable SSR summoned character.

The 2026 video game Nioh 3 features Ibaraki Doji as a boss-type enemy that players must defeat.
