= Ōeyama =

Ōeyama, Ooeyama or Mount Ooe may refer to:

- Ōeyama (mountain range) (大江山), a mountain range in Kyoto Prefecture, Japan
- Ōeyama (mountain) (大枝山), a mountain in Kyoto Prefecture, Japan

== See also ==
- Ooe (disambiguation)
