= Ooe =

Ooe may refer to:

- Out-of-order execution
- Ōe (surname)
- Ōeyama (大江山), a mountain range in Kyoto Prefecture, Japan, north to Kyoto.
- Ōeyama (大枝山), a mountain in Kyoto Prefecture, Japan, south to Kyoto.
- Ooe (video game)
