= List of Hinomaru Sumo episodes =

Main promotional image for the anime

Hinomaru Sumo is an anime series adapted from the manga of the same title by Kawada. It is directed by Yasutaka Yamamoto at Gonzo and Kii Tanaka is the character designer. The 24-episode anime television series aired from October 5, 2018, to March 29, 2019. Crunchyroll simulcast the series, while Funimation produced an English dub. The first opening theme is "Fire Ground" by Official Hige Dandism, and the first ending theme is "Hiizuru Basho" (日出ズル場所) by Omedetai Atama de Nani Yori. The second opening theme is "Be the Naked" by Lead, and the second ending theme is "Sakura Sake" (桜咲け) by Yamada Yoshida.

== Episode list ==
No.	Title (Note: All English titles are taken from Crunchyroll.)	Original air date
1	"National Treasure Onimaru Kunitsuna"; Transliteration: "Kokuhō onimaru kunitsuna" (Japanese: 国宝・鬼丸国綱)	October 5, 2018
High School first year and Sumo wrestler Hinomaru Ushio saves Chizuko Hori from a molester on a train but is himself arrested for only wearing a Mawashi. Hinomaru rushes to school and overhears fellow Sumo student Shinya Ozeki practicing. He offers to spar with him, revealing a heavily scarred yet extremely muscular body. Hinomaru easily wins despite his short stature. Shinya is overjoyed someone wants to join Sumo Club but reveals the other members are all delinquents who use the dojo as their headquarters. Hinomaru confronts them and learns that he accidentally came to the wrong school, Odachi High instead of Ishigami High. He tries to find Ishigami but ends up back at Odachi where he sees the delinquents have destroyed Shinya's Sumo ring. He challenges their leader, Yuma Gojo, to a duel for the dojo and, due to his intense training, easily wins even whilst following Yuma's unfair rules. He then challenges Yuma to a friendly rematch any time. Shinya suddenly realises Hinomaru was a famous Sumo champion in Middle School nicknamed after the Demonic National Treasure, Onimaru Kunitsuna. The next day Shinya starts advertising for new club members and realises Hinomaru has decided to attend Odachi instead of Ishigami and has joined Sumo Club.
2	"Wrestling vs Sumo"; Transliteration: "Resuringu tai sumō" (Japanese: レスリングvs相撲)	October 12, 2018
As most students have no interest in Sumo Hinomaru decides to tempt potential members with Chankonabe, but this only attracts Chihiro Kunisaki, a mixed martial arts wrestler. While Chihiro has no interest in Sumo he and Hinomaru bond over their drive to become champions and invites Hinomaru to his exhibition fight. Reina Gojo, Yuma's sister and Student Council President, develops a grudge against Hinomaru for defeating her brother. At the exhibition Hinomaru challenges Chihiro to a match. As Chihiro does not consider Sumo a genuine martial art Hinomaru suggests Chihiro fight using wrestling rules while Hinomaru will follow Sumo rules, despite this giving Chihiro a distinct advantage. Reina acts as referee, intending to manipulate the rules so Hinomaru loses. However, Hinomaru pins Chihiro in less than a second, pointing out that if Chihiro were following Sumo rules, he would have lost. As they continue they both show extreme skill but in the end Chihiro happily admits defeat. Reina is outraged she couldn't disqualify Hinomaru. Chihiro decides to join Sumo club, along with Kei Mitsuhashi who saw their fight. Reina is confused after Yuma decides to join Sumo club. Hinomaru's old friend, Kirihito Tsuji, also joins the club as team coach.
3	"The Kusanagi Sword"; Transliteration: "Kusanagi ken" (Japanese: 草薙剣)	October 19, 2018
Kirihito arranges practise matches for the club against sumo wrestlers from Eiga University. Everyone loses their matches except Chihiro who wins with a wrestling move. Hinomaru realises two of his former competitors, Sosuke Kuze and Shun Kariyu, both attend Eiga. It is revealed Kirihito only managed to arrange the matches because Eiga's manager wants Sosuke, also a National Treasure nicknamed Kusanagi Sword, to wrestle Hinomaru and regain his motivation to participate in matches. Flashbacks reveal Sosuke's father banned him from matches after he accidentally dislocated Hinomaru's shoulder in Elementary School. Hinomaru challenges Sosuke to defy his father, but Sosuke refuses, so Shun wrestles Hinomaru instead. Shun is also a champion Sumo, despite being almost as short as Hinomaru, and though he greatly respects Hinomaru's skills, he is determined to beat him. Hinomaru struggles against Shun's extremely low leg takedowns, but still manages to throw him and win. Hinomaru challenges Sosuke again and this time, he agrees. Sosuke traps Hinomaru with the same hold he used to dislocate his arm, only this time Hinomaru breaks free. A teacher suddenly arrives to enforce Sosuke's ban on fighting and the match is left unfinished. Hinomaru is disappointed but Shun confirms Sosuke has regained his motivation.
4	"Dachi High's Fifth Member"; Transliteration: "Dachi daka no go ninme" (Japanese: ダチ高の五人目)	October 26, 2018
Kirihito reminds Hinomaru how he refused to change his Sumo style even though Sosuke's father told him his height was a disadvantage. The other club members learn that professional Sumo must be at least 167cm tall, meaning Hinomaru is too short to ever become a professional. Yuma complains that Kirihito never trains, so Kirihito decides to prove himself by coaching Kei who then defeats Yuma, Chihiro and Shinya effortlessly. Kirihito then decides to wrestle Hinomaru himself. Hinomaru almost wins but Kirihito uses Hinomaru's signature move and defeats him, but the reason Kirihito cannot compete is revealed to be a lung condition that prevents him exerting himself for longer than 20 seconds. Kirihito assures Kei he can become a great Sumo Wrestler then explains why Hinomaru continues to train. If Hinomaru becomes Japan's High School Champion and then the Amateur All Japan Champion he can legally compete to become a Professional Sumo Champion without having to meet the height requirement. The club accepts Kirihito as their coach. Elsewhere Sosuke admits to his father that he took part in a match, but rather than being angry his father decides to let him compete again, and shows an interest in Hinomaru's training progress.
5	"The Refreshing Sumo Wrestler, Sada Mizuki"; Transliteration: "Sawayaka rikishi suna Den Mizuki" (Japanese: さわやか☆力士 沙田美月)	November 2, 2018
Reina is not impressed with Kirihito's nonsensical training, but Yuma trusts Kirihito, despite not liking him. Kirihito decides they will visit Ishigami High, where the Sumo Champion nicknamed after the National Treasure Mikazuki Munechika is a student. Chihiro is forced to retake an exam he failed and cannot go, while Hinomaru is sent elsewhere. Reina is mistaken for the club manager by the Ishigami Sumo's who are disappointed Hinomaru is absent but impressed by Shinya's strength. Gennosuke Araki, a mixed martial artist from Ishigami arrives at Odachi to test himself against Hinomaru so Chihiro impulsively claims he is Hinomaru. At Ishigami Yuma shows his improved technique but is still defeated by heavyweight Keiichi Mamiya. Gennosuke realises Chihiro is not Hinomaru but is pleased to have met another MMA fighter practising Sumo. Shinya wrestles the seemingly carefree Mizuki Sada, but he turns out to be Mikazuki Munechika. Shinya is caught in an arm hold but after remembering advice Hinomaru gave him he almost succeeds in pushing Mizuki out of the ring, but is still defeated. Mizuki announces he is looking forward to wrestling Hinomaru one day. Elsewhere Hinomaru arrives at Shibakiyama Stable, a dojo famous for its professional Sumo's and intense training methods.
6	"Charge!! Shibakiyama Stable"; Transliteration: "Sakigake!! Shibaki yama heya" (Japanese: 魁!!柴木山部屋)	November 9, 2018
Oyakata Shibakiyama, master of the Shibakiyama Stable, is excited about Hinomaru after hearing Kirihito describe his skill, but becomes depressed after seeing Hinomaru's height. The other students don't take Hinomaru seriously and place him against Takuya Terahara to embarrass him, but Hinomaru easily defeats Takuya. Kirihito sent Hinomaru to Oyakata because Oyakata was once nicknamed Firecracker, and his Sumo style was very similar to Hinomaru's. Hinomaru piques the interest of Norihiro Saenoyama, a 9th rank Sekitori Sumo, who agrees to a practise match. However, after defeating Hinomaru numerous times he insults his technique as sloppy and his desire to become Yokozuna an insult to Sumo. Hinomaru demands another match and though he loses again he manages to force Norihiro's knee to touch the ground. Impressed, Norihiro invites Hinomaru to stay for further training. That night Hinomaru expresses his belief to club manager Saki Tennoji that he is not sure who was stronger, Norihiro or Sosuke. Oyakata hopes that Hinomaru has what it takes to become a professional Sumo and show the world that even short Sumo's can become Yokozuna. Saki hopes to see Hinomaru at the National Championship, but expresses doubt he will win, since he would be competing against her brother, Shido Tennoji, the current high school Yokozuna.
7	"The Honest Clown"; Transliteration: "Guchoku na dōke" (Japanese: 愚直な道化)	November 16, 2018
As Shinya is in his final year of High School he is worried that if the club doesn't pass the preliminary matches to move on to the National Championship he will never get another chance. Hinomaru assures him they will make it. As the matches begin the club members win consistently, except for Kei who cannot match his opponent's strength. In the final round the Odachi club must defeat the Ishigami club. Kei wrestles Mamiya but rather than attempt to overpower his much larger opponent he follows Kirihito's advice, gets behind Mamiya with his speed and tries to push him out of the ring, but Mamiya had been warned about this move by Tsuyoshi, counters, and throws Kei from the ring, defeating him. Chihiro sees how angry and disappointed Kei is with himself and decides to beat his own opponent for Kei's sake. Chihiro faces Gennosuke and they rapidly throw, counter and grapple each other using their Judo and Karate moves. Chihiro keeps getting distracted by the thought of disappointing his team, until Hinomaru reminds him to focus only on his own fight. He counters Gennosuke one more time then uses Hinomaru's signature move to throw Gennosuke and win the match.
8	"What's Done Is Done"; Transliteration: "Fukusui bon ni kaerazu" (Japanese: 覆水盆に返らず)	November 23, 2018
Yuma faces Tsuyoshi, who has a particular hatred for delinquents, and he is almost knocked from the ring. A flashback shows that after joining the Sumo Club Yuma felt genuine remorse for bullying Shinya and begged his former karate master to take him back so he could help his sumo teammates achieve victory. He almost gets the upper hand but Tsuyoshi's advanced sumo training gives him the advantage and Yuma is defeated. Shinya faces Yuki Sanada who immediately knocks Shinya to the ground before the match officially starts, trying to knock his confidence before the real match, but this fails and Shinya easily stands up to him. Several flashbacks show Yuki once defeated delinquents at Ishigami in a fight and was suspended, during which he witnessed Shinya's sumo resolve numerous times despite having his own problems with delinquents and gained enormous respect for him. As Shinya and Yuki are evenly matched in skill and strength the match is decided when they both topple from the ring at the same time and the referee gives Shinya the victory. With Ishigami and Odachi neck and neck overall victory will be determined by the final match, Hinomaru versus Mizuki Sada, the ace of Ishigami's Sumo Club.
9	"Demon and Moon"; Transliteration: "Oni to Tsuki" (Japanese: 鬼と月)	November 30, 2018
Mizuki is excited to face Hinomaru as he has grown bored wrestling less skilled opponents. As the fight begins Mizuki is happy to find Hinomaru is his equal, but when faced with Hinomaru's intensity he is forced to fight seriously for once as they trade heavy attacks and counter each other's moves. As Hinomaru makes it into position to throw Mizuki and win, Mizuki successfully counters, throwing Hinomaru over his shoulder. As he is in the air Hinomaru has a flashback to all his previous losses, of his mother and his teammates and furiously survives the takedown by landing on his feet but injuring his elbow at the same time. He grapples Mizuki again and uses a new move to throw Mizuki onto his back, defeating him and making Odachi victors of the Preliminary matches. On top of their victory each member of the club ends up having learnt a valuable lesson. Hinomaru's injured arm turns out to be minor, but it turns out Mizuki has a partially dislocated shoulder and a fractured arm. He tries to quit his club in shame but the other members don't blame him and refuse to let him quit. Despite their exhaustion and injuries Chihiro announces he wants one more match against the strongest Sumo he knows, Hinomaru.
10	"Unyielding Feelings"; Transliteration: "Yuzurenai Kimochi" (Japanese: 譲れない気持ち)	December 7, 2018
The Odachi club now take part in individual matches where they will likely have to wrestle each other. Shinya almost loses but wins through sheer luck. Hinomaru easily wins his match, as does Chihiro, who copies Mizuki's takedown move. Yuma wins his match before Hinomaru faces Chihiro. Chihiro tries to confuse Hinomaru by copying moves from Gennosuke, Tsuyoshi and Yuma but in the end is defeated after Hinomaru counters with a head-butt and a takedown. Despite his loss Chihiro is happy, meanwhile it is revealed Hinomaru's arm is actually seriously injured and he hid the truth from the others so they wouldn't go easy on him. Kei loses his match but keep his faith in Kirihito's training. After winning his second match Shinya faces Hinomaru and quickly realises Hinomaru's arm is injured, but they continue to fight seriously out of respect for each other with Shinya even managing to survive Hinomaru's signature takedown, the Demon Wheel. They end up chest to chest in a contest of pure strength, but in the end Hinomaru forces Shinya out of the ring and is declared champion of the individual matches. To celebrate Reina takes a commemorative photo of everybody together.
11	"Barbecue"; Transliteration: "Yakiniku" (Japanese: 焼肉)	December 14, 2018
The Sumo club becomes popular after Chizuko Hori, whom Hinomaru saved from a molester, posted a video of their competition online. She asks to become their manager, making Reina jealous, so Kirihito makes her and Reina co-managers. They go to a barbecue buffet challenge. Stamina Jiro, the restaurant owner, tries to overload them with carbohydrates before they can get to the expensive meat, thus increasing his profit. However they all eat massive portions, especially Hinomaru, and Jiro loses a lot of money. He wishes them well in future competitions before banning them from eating at his restaurant again. Hinomaru is concerned Yuma has lost his motivation. Kirihito pairs Yuma with Shinya for training but Yuma cannot go all out as he is still ashamed he used to bully Shinya. However he is surprised to learn Shinya now considers him a friend and teammate. Reina is surprised that pairing Yuma with Shinya was Hinomaru's idea to help Yuma regain his motivation. Kirihito and Hinomaru worry about how Hinomaru can defeat Shido Tennoji. They receive a call from Oyakata inviting the Odachi club to a training weekend where they will get the chance to wrestle an Ōzeki, though they will have to travel to Nagoya.
12	"Attack!! Nagoya Castle"; Transliteration: "Gekitotsu!! Nagoya-jō" (Japanese: 激突!!名古屋城)	December 21, 2018
At Nagoya Hinomaru attempts to wrestle a Sumo actor playing the role of Maeda Keiji but gets in an argument with a giant Sumo who also wants to wrestle Maeda and challenges him, only the giant is Tenma Hikage, AKA National treasure Odenta Mitsuyo who is most likely to become Japans next High School Yokozuna. Hinomaru sees an opportunity to throw Tenma and grabs him, but realise it was a trap and hesitates. The match is stopped by Tenma's captain and they leave. Tenma suggests he has a guaranteed method of defeating Hinomaru but wants to save it for the Nationals. At Oyakata's training camp Nirihiro takes Hinomaru to train with the Sekitori. Reina and Chizuko secretly film them while an old man also observes. The Sekitori refuse to respect Hinomaru so he challenges Sekitori Mionishiki. Despite still worrying about almost losing against Tenma Hinomaru overcomes his hesitation and defeats Mionishiki. However, Hinomaru is then defeated by all the other Sekitori and then by Mionishiki during a rematch, who explains that Hinomaru's signature move is full of weaknesses. The old man decides to train Hinomaru himself and asks Reina to join them. Hinomaru is surprised that the Sekitori's show the old man great respect. He reveals that he is a former Champion Yokozuna and he intends to train Hinomaru until his signature move is perfected.
13	"100-yen-coin Training"; Transliteration: "100 yen tama no shugyō" (Japanese: 100円玉の修行)	January 11, 2019
Chizuko learns the old man is Ogawa Tokio, nicknamed Shunkai Tokio, a former Yokozuna who successfully trained two other Sumo to the rank of Yokozuna after he retired. Tenma arrives to train with the Sekitori. Ogawa's training includes household chores and preparing meals on a 100 yen budget. Hinomaru is ordered to wrestle Ganryu Zeki, the fifth ranked Maegashira and to use his imperfect takedown, the Hundred Thousand Demon Drop. However he is defeated and the Maegashira secretly mocks him. However, he is overheard by a furious Ogawa who defends Hinomaru. Tenma learns Ogawa is training Hinomaru. Ogawa reveals to Reina Hinomaru's Sumo style brings inspiration to others and with Reina's help he could become a great sumo. When Reina offers Hinomaru any help he needs Hinomaru realises the point of the training. Tenma demands Ogawa train him instead and insists on wrestling Hinomaru. Ogawa allows it after Hinomaru declares he must move past his previous hesitation. Tenma is confident he can counter Hinomaru's move, but Hinomaru had realised there are numerous ways to use the same move and successfully uses the Hundred Thousand Demon Drop to throw Tenma to the ground. As a reward Ogawa invites Hinomaru to wrestle with Japans current Yokozuna, and though Hinomaru loses in less than 5 seconds, he enjoys it.
14	"The Inter High Begins"; Transliteration: "Intā hai kaimaku" (Japanese: インターハイ開幕)	January 18, 2019
Kirihito notices that Shinya is easily intimidated by strong opponents. To give him confidence Chihiro and Chizuko force him to challenge the Sumo Club of Kanazawa Kita High School. Yuma continues karate training while Kei continues strength training. At first the Kanazwawa's appear grateful Hinomaru defeated Tenma and provided him with motivation, but they refuse to wrestle Shinya as the Odachi club has less history than the Kanazawa's. Insulted Shinya stands up to the Kanazawa team and regains his confidence. Kei is allowed to wrestle with Shibakiyama, making Kirihito slightly envious. Kei asks Shibakiyama to wrestle with Kirihito as he had noticed that Kirihito desperately wants to be a sumo wrestler and help his teammates but feels crippled by his lungs. Kei manages to convince Kirihito to wrestle with Shibakiyama. Kirihito is inspired by his teammate's faith in him and manages to defeat Shibakiyama. With the training camp over the Odachi club return to school. Shinya maintains his confidence by practising Sumo in public while Chihiro approaches Mizuki for help with his training. Meanwhile Tennoji, the High School Yokozuna, issues a challenge to any high school sumo willing to face him, greatly inspiring Hinomaru as they finally head to the National Championships.
15	"Onimaru Kunitsuna and Dōjikire Yasutsuna"; Transliteration: "Onimaru Kunitsuna to Dōjikire Yasutsuna" (Japanese: 鬼丸国綱と童子切安綱)	January 25, 2019
Hinomaru and Tennoji finally face each other in the ring. Tennoji had revealed that, like Hinomaru, he was once short but he trained relentlessly and eventually had a growth spurt making him 188cm tall. The match immediately goes badly for Hinomaru as Tennoji counters Hinomaru's every move. It is revealed Tennoji collected recordings of every wrestler who made it to the Nationals to learn how to counter their moves. Hinomaru manages to move him into position for the Hundred Thousand Demon Drop. Tennoji is surprised as Hinomaru only perfected the move recently, meaning Tennoji never saw him use it before. However it becomes clear Hinomaru is fighting to win, whereas Tennoji is fighting because he enjoys it, which is why Hinomaru is still not strong enough. Tennoji throws Hinomaru to the ground with an arm lock, defeating him. Hinomaru's friends are devastated as his defeat means his dream to become Japan's Yokozuna by avoiding the height restriction is now over. Shinya, having seen that Hinomaru's arm is injured again, forces him to get medical treatment, revealing that even though Hinomaru lost to Tennoji he can still avoid the height restriction rule if they beat Tennoji's team in the Team Matches. Hinomaru agrees to get his arm treated in time for the Dachi Club to face and defeat Tennoji's team.
16	"National Treasure is Delicious"; Transliteration: "Kokuhō is derishasu" (Japanese: 国宝 is デリシャス)	February 1, 2019
Shibakiyama takes Hinomaru to the extremely shabby Kanie clinic, run by eccentric doctor Kanie Tetsuhara. The Dachi club are placed against the Kanazawa Kita High team, which includes National Treasure Tenma Hikage. Shinya faces Ryou Aizawa, Kanazawa's captain, and surprises everybody by knocking him straight out of the ring. The doctor decides to treat Hinomaru after hearing him talk about supporting his team and reveals that while the front of his clinic is shabby, the back is full of high tech medical equipment. Yuma faces Sera Takumi, who is able to defend against his strikes, but is defeated when Yuma uses a trip and strike, the Castle Break Punch. Chihiro faces Tenma and uses the training he received from Mizuki to evaluate Tenma's moves. As they grapple Tenma recalls a lesson he learned while watching his brother wrestle and realises his spirit was exactly like Hinomaru's. Tenma puts more power into his strikes but Chihiro's unorthodox style wins out and he manages to lift and throw Tenma to the ground, defeating him. He is surprised to learn the move he used on instinct was a powerful but difficult technique called the Kimono String Drop. Hinomaru returns, fully recovered, to support his team.
17	"The One Loved by the Sumo Gods"; Transliteration: "Sumō no Kami ni aisareta otoko" (Japanese: 相撲の神に愛された男)	February 8, 2019
Elated by Tenma's defeat the Dachi club defeat all of Tenma's teammates, followed by defeating all the members of the team from Kabutoyama High School. Kei is the only one to lose his match but he remains determined. Hinomaru and his friends are invited to practise with Sada and his team, and even though they are rivals Sada decides to give them advice on facing Tennoji. Kirihito watches a match between Tennoji and Kuze and worries that whoever wins the match will grow even more powerful and cause problems should one of the Dachi club have to wrestle them in the future. Ogawa asks Hinomaru how he plans to defeat Tennoji given that he lost against him in the individual match. Hinomaru explains that following his loss he realised he has a store of inner strength he must learn to use. Tennoji and Kuze battle fiercely while Sada explains Tennoji has two sumo styles, the calm composed style he uses while observing and evluating his opponents, and his more beastly style that focuses on power with no defensive moves. Hinomaru succeeds in using his inner strength to defeat Sada. Kirihito returns and reveals that in the end Kuze defeated Tennoji.
18	"How I Win"; Transliteration: "Boku no Kachi Kata" (Japanese: 僕の克ち方)	February 15, 2019
Tennoji, Kuze and Hinomaru reach the semi-finals where Hinomaru's team face Tennoji's. Shinya faces Enoki who has admired Tennoji for years and is desperate for Tennoji to have a rematch against Kuze. Shinya is larger whereas Enoki has trained in Aikido. Despite putting up a good fight Shinya is thrown and defeated. Kei faces Shutou Masaomi. Kei worries that his use of tricks and feints mean Hinomaru won't respect him, until Hinomaru assures him it is a perfectly respectable style. Kei attacks Shutou head on but attacks too early using Sanada's false start technique to unbalance Shutou mentally. He then follows by walking away from Shutou once the match starts. Shutou loses his temper and charges wildly. Kei performs his reverse technique followed by a leg sweep, and they both fall out of the ring with Kei declared the winner. As they celebrate other referees challenge the result and instead declare it a simultaneous loss, so Kei and Shutou must wrestle again. Unable to use his techniques a second time Kei is defeated instantly. For the next match Chihiro faces Kano Akihira, AKA National Treasure Okanehira. Chihiro overhears Kano disrespecting Kei's efforts and becomes even more inspired to defeat him.
19	"Weak spirit, Strong Will"; Transliteration: "Yowaki kokoro ni, tsuyoki ishi" (Japanese: 弱き心に、強き意志)	February 22, 2019
Kano attacks Chihiro first, expecting that Chihiro will focus on defence due to his fear of losing and disappointing his teammates, but Chihiro decides to attack as well by copying Odenta's thrusting palm strikes and almost causes Kano to drop to the ground. Kano believes that being second place to Tennoji was something to be proud of and refuses to lose to anyone except Tennoji and manages to get both hands on Chihiro's belt. Rather than counter Chihiro draws inspiration from Kei and forces Kano out of the ring, winning the match. Next Yuma must wrestle Batomf Batbayar, an exchange student specialising in Mongolian wrestling, but the pressure starts to get to him, until he is reassured by Hinomaru and gets over his attack of nerves. Batomf tries to beat Yuma at his own game by using powerful strikes like Yuma does. Unable to gain an advantage Yuma starts using the karate techniques his master taught him to use against sumo wrestlers. They furiously strike, grapple and counter but in the end Yuma's determination wins out and he succeeds in striking Batomf so many times he is forced out of the ring, winning the match.
20	"Onimaru Kunitsuna and Dōjikire Yasutsuna Go Again"; Transliteration: "Onimaru Kunitsuna to Dōjikire Yasutsuna, futatabi" (Japanese: 鬼丸国綱と童子切安綱、再び)	March 1, 2019
Batomf is devastated as his loss means they are now tied with Hinomaru's team and victory depends on the final match, Tennoji versus Hinomaru. Having faced each other before Tennoji and Hinomaru understand each other's moves and counter moves, but Tennoji's greater experience starts to show as Hinomaru is pushed towards the edge of the ring. Knowing he is in danger Hinomaru ceases his preferred method of all-out attack and adopts a defensive pose, even moving backwards, making the crowd believe he has given up. However, it was only a ruse and Hinomaru uses the distance between them for a powerful lunge, attacking with moves borrowed from his teammates, momentarily confusing Tennoji and allowing Hinomaru to grab his belt, but Tennoji recovers and counters in an instant. Hinomaru recalls advice from Chizuko and all the help everyone has given him and pulls off the Demon's Enduring Determination: Hundred Thousand Demon Drop. Tennoji almost counters while smiling but in the end Hinomaru throws Tennoji to the ground and is declared victor, earning his club a place in the Finals. Tennoji looks forward to his rematch with Hinomaru when they both make it to the professional leagues. Kuze and his team get fired up as they prepare to face Hinomaru in the Finals.
21	"Idiot and Idiot"; Transliteration: "Baka to Baka" (Japanese: バカとバカ)	March 8, 2019
The Dachi club relax now that they have gotten Hinomaru his chance to face Kuze, but their attitude angers Reina as she knows Hinomaru can only fight at his strongest if his team fight as hard as he does. Chihiro has a grudge against a member of Kuze's team. Reina breaks her usual character and tells Hinomaru she hopes he has fun. In the first match Chihiro faces Hyodo Masato, whom it transpires is his older brother, explaining his grudge. Hyodo tries to enrage Chihiro by waking away like Kei walked away from Shutou, however this fails as Kirihito points out, Hyodo is a skilled wrestler but is also a colossal idiot. Chihiro is determined to beat Hyodo as Hyodo spent their entire childhood beating him at every sport and hobby he ever tried. Chihiro realises that Hyodo, who normally would have quit a sport like sumo after a few months, has spent 2 whole years developing his skills, and realises Hyodo must truly love Sumo like he does. After a fierce fight Chihiro almost manages to throw him but Hyodo instead trips Chihiro onto his back, defeating him. As Kei is too injured to take part Kirihito takes his place in the second match.
22	"The Forgotten National Treasure, Onikire Yasutsuna"; Transliteration: "Wasurerareta kokuhō Onikire Yasutsuna" (Japanese: 忘れられた国宝・鬼切安綱)	March 15, 2019
Kirihito is determined to win to thank Kei for giving him a chance to fight an official match again. Rion is larger with good sumo instincts, and retreats to avoid Kirihito's counter moves. Kirihito starts to have difficulty breathing but Hinomaru shouts encouragement and he manages to surpass his 20 second limit and throw Rion, though they both fall out of the ring together. The referee declares it a draw meaning they must wrestle again, even though Kirihito has already gone over his time limit. Rion decides to draw the match out to take advantage of Kirihito's breathing, but Kirihito overcomes his lungs and defeats Rion instantly, experiencing victory once again. Yuma faces Jin Yomoda happily despite Jin being vastly heavier. Jin assumes Yuma will be tired from his previous matches only to be pushed back by Yuma's powerful strikes. They grapple fiercely until a referee suddenly pauses the match to deal with Jin's heavily bleeding nose. During the pause both wrestlers receive encouragement from their teams. Jin lifts Yuma into the air to carry him outside the ring. Yuma escapes but is suddenly pushed onto his back and is defeated. The Dachi club remain in high spirits, despite having lost two matches, and Shinya prepares to wrestle Daniel Stefanov.
23	"Spirit"; Transliteration: "Hatsu ki yōyō" (Japanese: 発気揚々)	March 22, 2019
As the match starts Shinya notices that he and Daniel took up sumo for the same reasons and both met people they could look up to, Hinomaru and Kuze. As they grapple Daniel switches to palm strikes when he is unable to grab Shinya's belt. Daniel almost throws Shinya but Shinya notices that Daniel is only copying Kuze's moves, whereas Shinya is proud of his own moves and has no desire to copy Hinomaru. For that reason Daniel fails to throw Shinya and is defeated when Shinya counters and throws Daniel. As both teams now have two victories overall victory of the team tournament will be decided by Hinomaru versus Kuze. Before entering the ring Hinomaru thanks each member of his team for coming this far together. Hinomaru and Kuze's spirits build until they suddenly begin. Hinomaru headbutts Kuze and pushes him towards the rings edge with rapid palm strikes, but Kuze responds with a powerful thrust that almost knocks Hinomaru off his feet. Hinomaru attacks Kuze directly rather than try to outmanoeuvre him and headbutts him repeatedly in the stomach before grabbing his belt. Kuze also grabs Hinomaru's belt, putting them both in the perfect positions to use their ultimate moves, the Hundred Thousand Demon Drop and the Great Serpent Cleaver.
24	"The Dream Continues"; Transliteration: "Yume no Tsuzuki" (Japanese: 夢の続き)	March 29, 2019
Kuze recalls his father's lesson that Yokozuna always end up alone at the top of the sumo world, yet he has never been alone because others like Hinomaru are beside him aiming for the same goal. Kuze's mother sees him smile for the first time during a match. Hinomaru remembers how he kept wrestling to make his mother proud, but now he continues because he loves sumo. His teammates realise Hinomaru is also smiling. Kuze tries to push Hinomaru backwards but Hinomaru counters and pushes Kuze backwards. Reina realises she loves sumo as much as everyone else on the team. Kuze realises he must stop copying his father and uses a new throwing move instinctively. Hinomaru avoids the throw and suddenly performs his original throwing move, The Demon Wheel, and throws Kuze, defeating him. Odachi High School is declared victors. As a result Hinomaru earns his place in the All Japan National Championship but is defeated in the semi-finals by Tennoji and comes in third place. Despite the loss he enters the professional league as a Sandanme. Tennoji becomes a fifteenth rank Makushita. Kuze also becomes a professional sumo. As a professional Hinomaru is required to drop out of school but regrets that this means leaving his team. As a goodbye gift his teammates challenge him to wrestle each of them on Shinya's newly rebuilt sumo ring and Hinomaru happily accepts.
