= Shuten-dōji =

Demon from Japanese folklore

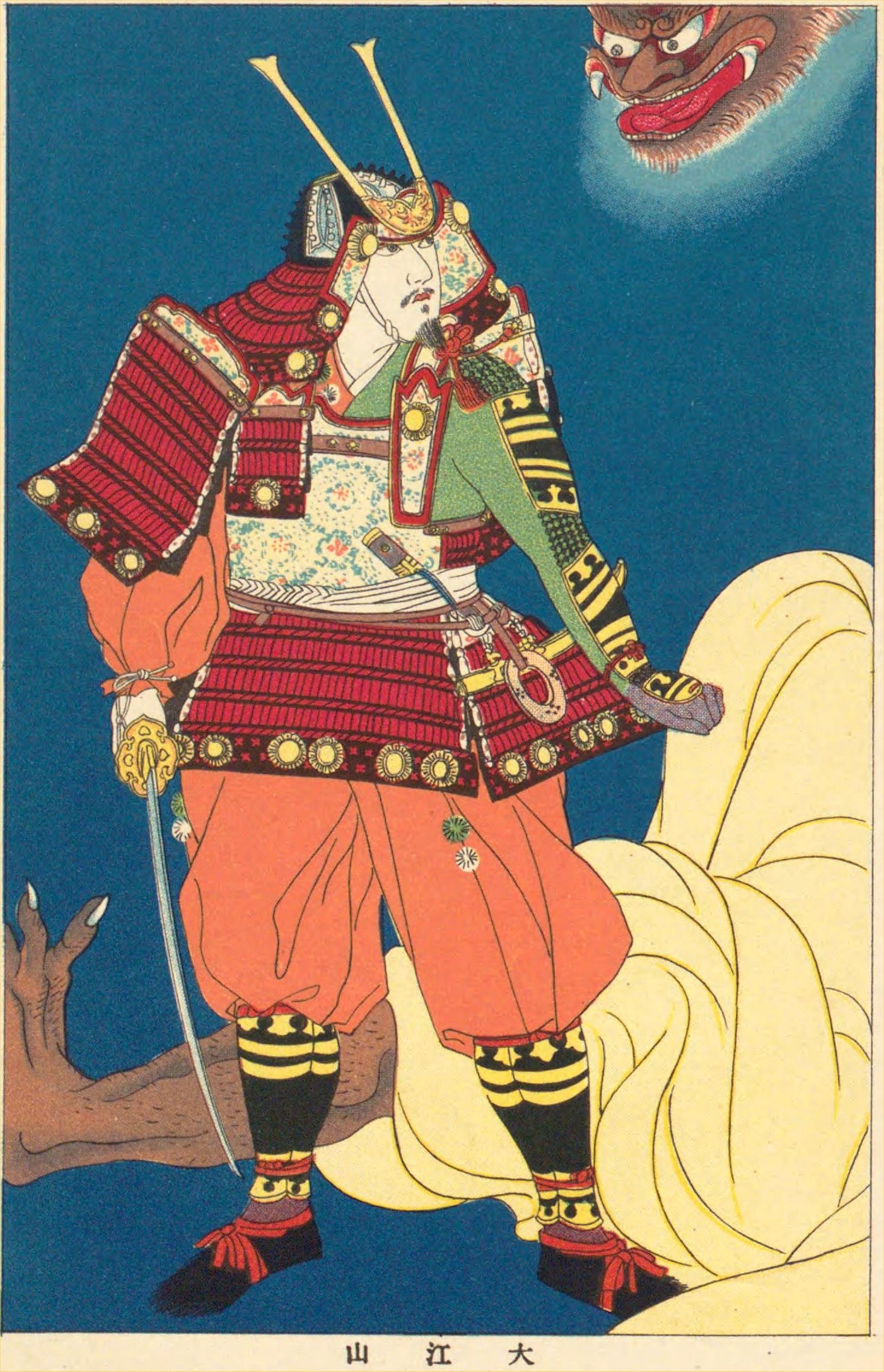
Shuten-dōji's severed head attacks the warrior Raikō. ―Illustration by Settai Komura (1927)

Shuten-dōji (酒呑童子, also sometimes called 酒顛童子, 酒天童子, or 朱点童子) is a mythical oni or demon leader of Japan, who according to legend was killed by the hero Minamoto no Raikō. Although decapitated, the demon's detached head still took a bite at the hero, who avoided death by wearing multiple helmets stacked on his head.

Shuten-dōji had his lair at Mount Ōe (大江山) northwest of the city of Kyoto, or Mount Ibuki, depending on the version. It has also been theorized that the original mountain was Mount Ōe (大枝山) on the western edge of the city of Kyoto.

== Texts ==
The oldest surviving text of the legend is recorded in the 14th century Ōeyama Ekotoba (大江山絵詞 "Tale of Mount Ōe in Pictures and Words"), a picture scroll held by the Itsuō Art Museum. It was later incorporated into the corpus of Otogi-zōshi ("Companion tales"), and became widely read in the woodblock-printed versions of them called the Otogi Bunko (Companion Library), especially Shibukawa Seiemon editions (ca. 1720). There is also a set of texts which localizes the Shuten-dōji's fortress at Mt. Ibuki. The Mt. Ibuki group texts reveal the villain's honji (avatar identity) as "the demon king of the Sixth Heaven" (Dairokuten maō), whereas the Mt. Ōe-localized group texts generally do not, with the exception of Ōeyama Ekotoba which is oldest.

== Localization ==
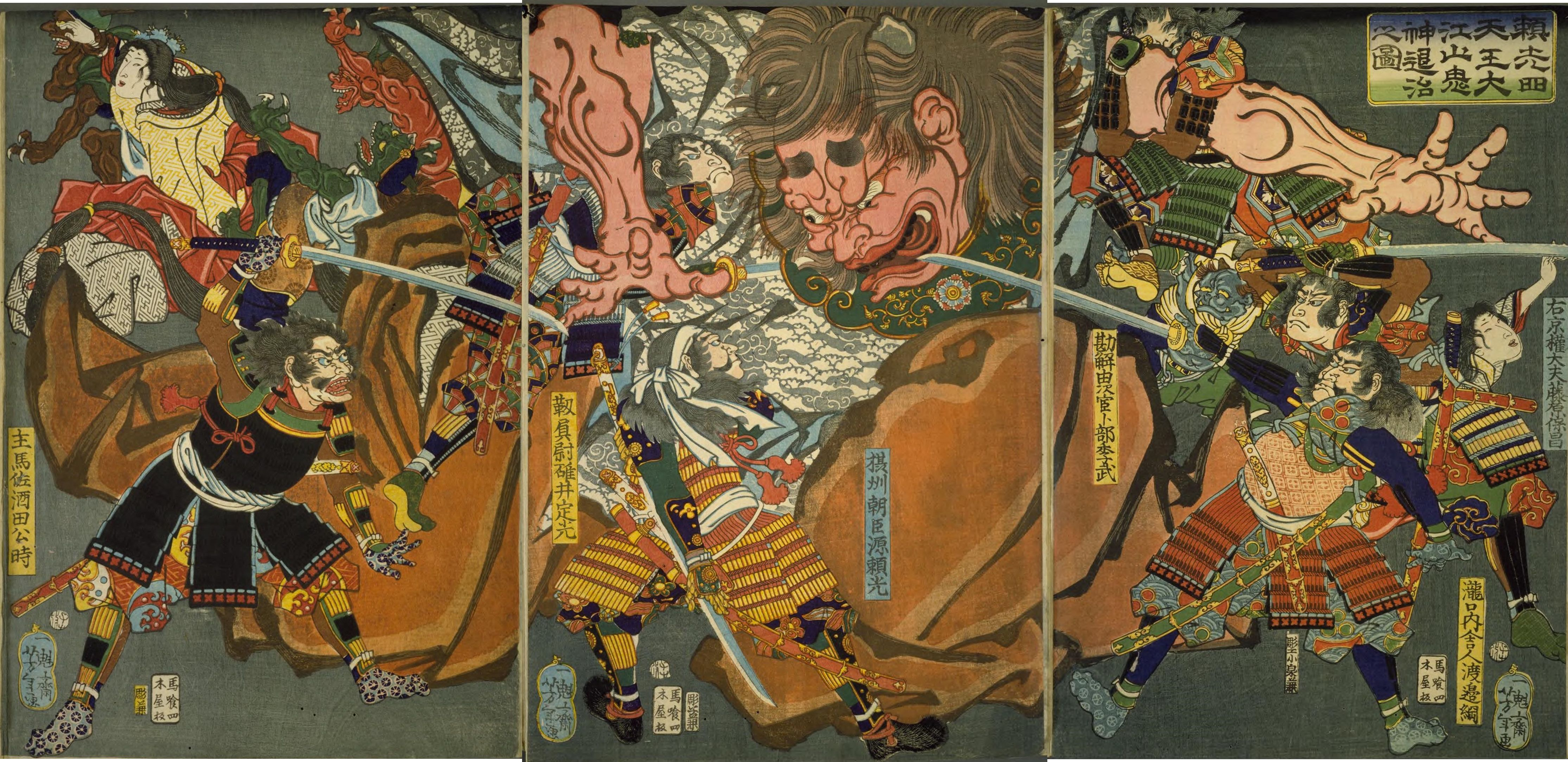
An ukiyo-e by Yoshitoshi depicting Minamoto no Yorimitsu's retainers, Watanabe no Tsuna, Urabe no Suetake, Usui Sadamitsu, and Sakata no Kintoki and aristocrat Fujiwara no Yasumasa fighting Shuten-dōji on Ōeyama.

There are two different mountains named Mt. Ōe in Tanba Province. The Otogi Zōshi text of the later period is clearly referring to Ōeyama (大江山) northwest of the Kyoto capital, since it specifically mentions Senjōdake which is part of this mountain chain.

But recent scholarship assigns the original mountain to have been the Mt. Ōe (大枝山) further south (on the western edge of Kyoto city and extending to Kameoka, Kyoto). This other Mt. Ōe also has a piece of acclivity named Oi-no-Saka (老ノ坂, "Slope of Aging").

There are in fact some comparatively recent versions that actually place the demon lair at the southerly Mt. Ōe, or portray the Senjōdake as the main and Oi-no-Saka as the secondary fortification for the demons, according to religious scholar and folklorist Takeda Chōshū.

== Summary (oldest version) ==
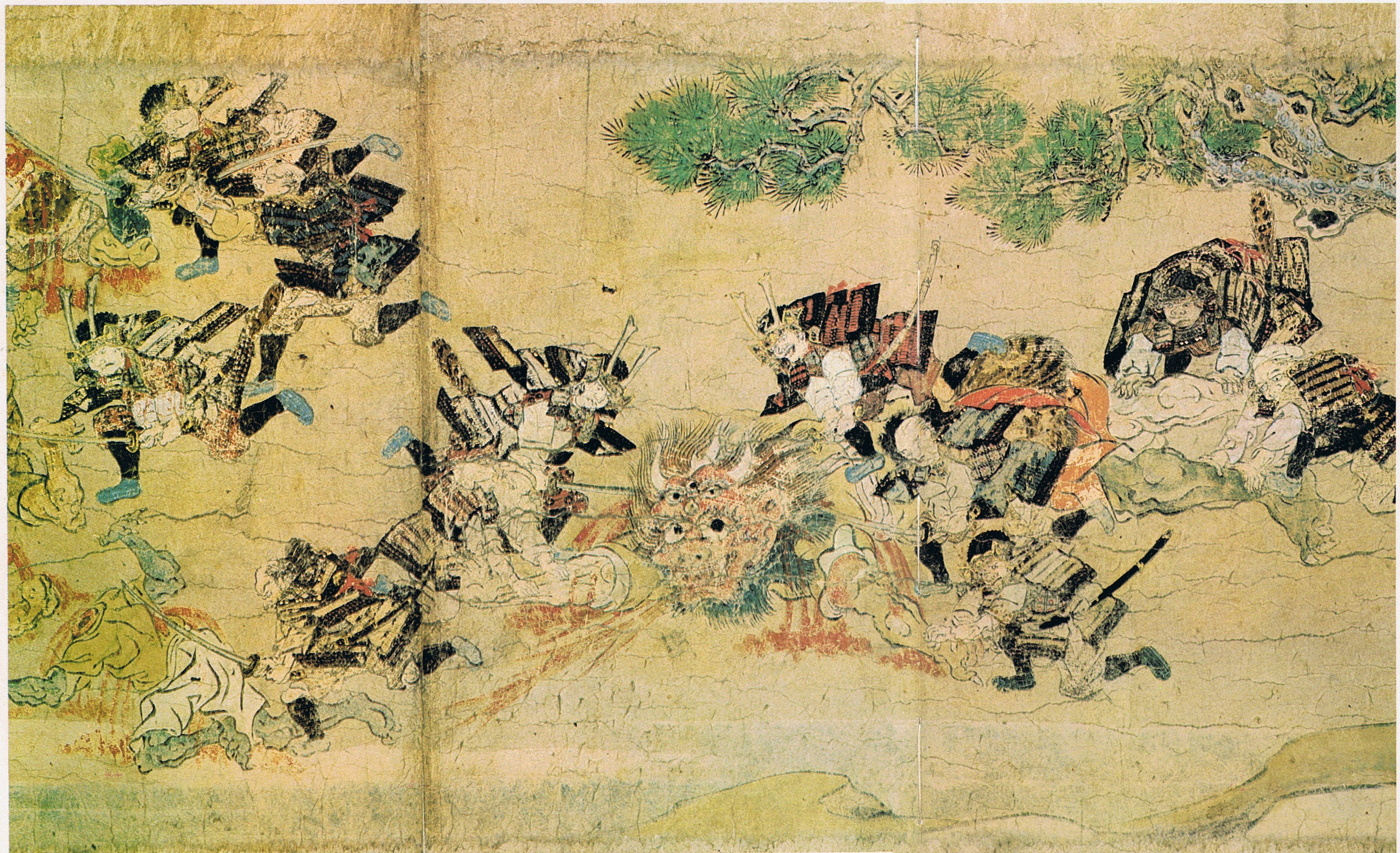
Scene from the Ōeyama Emaki. —Itsuō Art Museum

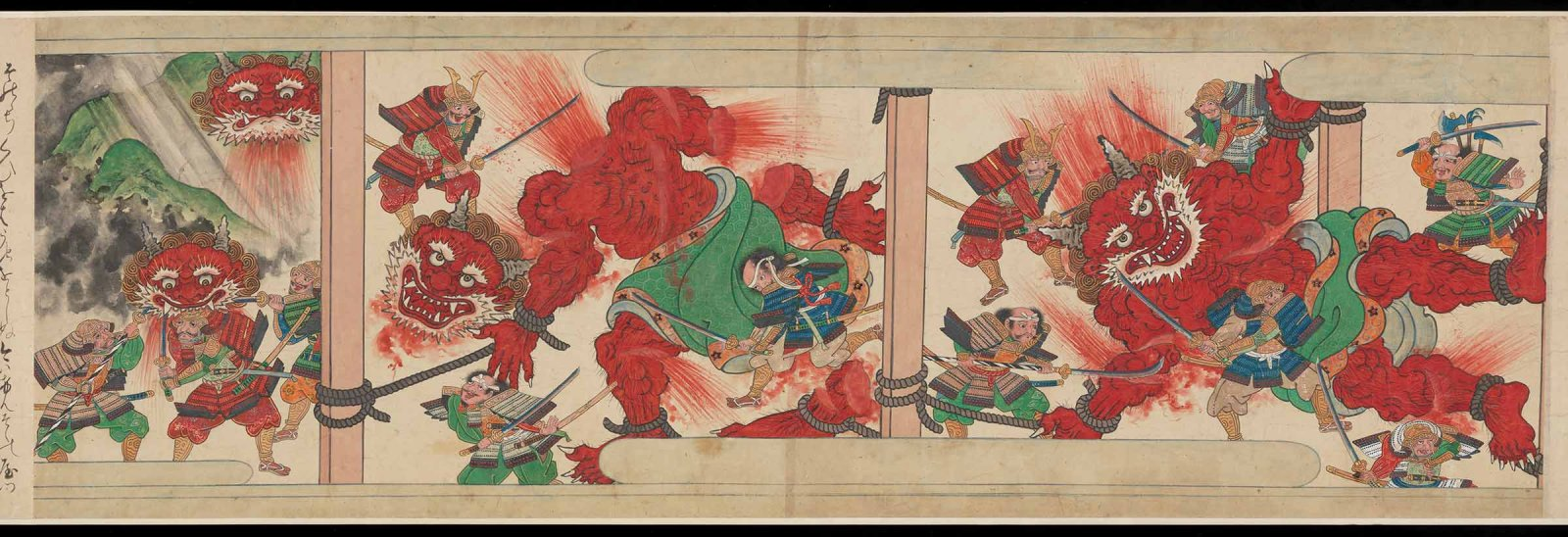
Raikō fights with Shuten-dōji. Scene from the 17th century edition of Ōeyama Emaki. Chester Beatty Library

The oldest text (Ōeyama Ekotoba or Ōeyama Emaki) version the legend can be summarized as follows:

During the reign of Emperor Ichijō (r. 986–1011), a large number of missing people were being reported in the capital city of Kyoto, most of the victims being young women. Abe no Seimei, the famous onmyōdō diviner of the imperial court, determines that the oni-king of Mt. Ōe (later identified as Shuten-dōji) was responsible for the abductions. The Emperor then commanded Minamoto no Raikō (Minamoto no Yorimitsu) and Fujiwara no Hōshō (Fujiwara no Yasumasa) to exterminate this demon. Raikō had his four lieutenants called the shitennō while Hōshō had only the junior secretary (shōgen) of Dazaifu to assist them. The party left Kyoto in the year 995.

The party encountered a group of four men who turned out to be transformations of four deities. At their recommendation, Raikō and his retinue disguised themselves as yamabushi priests. (Note: Not actually ordained priests but laymen training and practicing asceticism, typically in the mountains.) When they traveled through a cave-tunnel, they came to a river and found an old kidnapped woman doing the laundry. (Note: The old woman said her life had so far been spared since she seemed too sinewy and hard-boned to eat, and had served as a laundress for the demon-king for 200 years.) The old woman explained that the kidnapped young maidens were being forced to act as maidservants, but the ogres wantonly slaughtered the girls, ate their flesh and drank their blood.

The warriors, pretending to be priests, convinced the ogre-king to give them lodging. The ogre-king treated his guests with sake and began to tell the tale about himself, how he was called Shuten-dōji, the "sake-drinking lad" by his underlings for his love of drinking sake, and how the ogres had been displaced from their ancestral Hira Mountains when Enryaku-ji temple was built nearby. (Note: By the Dengyō Daishi, i.e., the priest Saichō.) and have been at Mt. Ōe since the year 849.

Raikō then offered Shuten-dōji the sake given to him by one of the deities, which rendered him incapacitated. The warriors dressed up in armor and weapons which they concealed in their priestly back-pack chests called oi (笈). (Note: Before attacking Shuten-dōj, they rescued important prisoners. One was a page (chigo) of the high priest of Tendai-ji, Jiei Daishi aka Ryōgen, and not only that, the page was the son of Midō no nyūdō (Fujiwara no Michinaga.)) Then they stormed Shuten-dōji's sleeping quarters, and while the four deities held down the ogre's limbs, Raikō cut off Shuten-dōji's head with a stroke of his sword, Dōjigiri. The severed head was still alive and snapped its jaws, aiming at Raikō's head, but the warrior defended himself by wearing two of his men's helmets in addition to his own. The group returned triumphant to Kyoto with the head, which was laid to rest in the Uji no hōzō (Treasure House of Uji) at Byōdō-in temple.

=== Physical description ===
According to the Ōeyama Ekotoba version, Shuten-dōji returned to his true form when he slept. He was 50 feet in height, had a red body and a five-horned head, with fifteen eyes; one leg was white and the other black, while his arms were yellow and blue.

== Otogi Bunko version ==
The version of the legend found in Shibukawa's Otogi Bunko has been printed in English translation by Haruo Shirane and Noriko T. Reider. Some of the textual similarities and differences are noted below.

=== Divination and expedition ===
This version is vague about the time frame (Note: Although it clarifies it to be some time after the Engi era (901-923).) but in the capital city of Kyoto people are being abducted. A certain middle counselor (Note: Middle Counselor Ikeda Kunitaka (池田中納言くにたか).) seeks his daughter's whereabouts and summons a diviner named Muraoka no Masatoki (rather than Seimei, as in the older text). (Note: Japanese: 村岡のまさとき.) Masatoki names the demons of Mt. Ōe of Tanba Province as the culprits.

The Mikado (Note: On the recommendation of the chief imperial advisor (kanpaku).) commands the formation of a punitive squad, consisting of the standard six warriors, Minamoto no Raikō and his "four guardian kings" (shitennō) including Watanabe no Tsuna (Note: The other three of the guardian kings are Sakata no Kintoki, Urabe no Suetake, Usui Sadamitsu.) and Hōshō.

=== Three gods and divine sake ===
Because demons are shape-shifters and formidable enemies, the group decides to pay homage to three shrines: Yawata Shrine (Iwashimizu Hachimangū), Sumiyoshi Shrine, and Kumano Shrine. (Note: In the oldest text, they visit a fourth, Hiyoshi Shrine. The number of shrines match the number of deities who later help them.)

Later, the group meet the gods of the three shrines disguised as old men. (Note: After visiting the shrine but before they meet the gods, Raikō devises the plan to dress up as yamabushi priests. This differs from the older text where the gods gives advice to dress this way.) The gods give Raikō the "sake [which is] divine elixir, poisonous to demons" (神便鬼毒酒, jinben kidoku shu) (Note: "Divine Miracle Wine", as rendered by Shirane.) which will rob the ogres of their ability to fly and stupefy them.

Even though Raikō is already carrying his own vermilion helm in his back-pack chest (cf. §Named swords and arms), he receives from the gods another helmet (of a hoshi kabuto type, translated as a "hobnailed helmet") which he is instructed to wear when he decapitates the enemy.

=== Infiltration ===
Just before reaching the lair, Raikō's group encounters the hostage working as laundress, who becomes their informant. Here, she is not an old woman as in the old text, but a 17 or 18-year-old daughter of a courtier. (Note: Only daughter of Middle Counselor Hanazono.) She reveals that the lair which is called Iron Palace (Kurogane no gosho, 鐵の御所) lies inside the Demon's Cavern (Oni no iwaya 鬼の岩屋), and forewarns the group about the four ogres who are Shutendōji's lieutenants.(cf. §Subordinates).

As in the oldest text, Raikō's party pretending to be yamabushi ascetics gains entry at Shuten-dōji's dwelling-place. Raikō disarms the ogre's suspicion by explaining that they, as yamabushi, follow the ways of En no Gyōja, whom he says was compassionate and hospitable towards demons. The warriors drink up the blood sake and heartily eat the human flesh in order to gain further confidence. At the height of the drunken revelry, Raikō offers Shuten-dōji the divine sake poisonous to demons. Shuten-dōji begins to tell his life story (he is originally from Echigo Province according to this text), and also recounts how his henchman Ibaraki-dōji lost an arm in an encounter with Tsuna, one of Raikō's men. (Note: Here it says Tsuna encounter at the crossing of "Horikawa and Seventh Avenue (Shichijō-dōri)", but the encounter is usually known to have taken place at the (Ichijōmodoribashi), which is at Horikawa and First Avenue.)

As in the older text, the warriors equip their hidden armor and swords and raid Shuten-dōji in his sleeping chamber. The three gods have arrived to help and chain the ogre's limbs to the pillars. As Raikō positions himself with his sword Chisui (or "Bloodsucker") in hand, the ogre faults the warrior for his sneaky underhanded tactics, exclaiming: "How sad, you priests! You said you do not lie. There is nothing false in the words of demons". (Note: In Japanese: "なさけなし(情なし)とよ客僧たち、偽りなしと聞きつるに、鬼神にわうどう(横道)なき物をと".) (Note: In the older Ōeyma Ekotoba text, Shuten-dōji says "Korera ni hakararete.. (Deceived by these men, I am now done with)".)

The warriors attack with their swords and sever Shuten-dōji's head, but as in the older text, the detached head attempts to get a bite at Raikō, and the hero is protected by two helmets stacked on his head: his Lion King helmet on top the hobnailed helmet (hoshi kabuto) given him by the gods. Subsequently, Ibaraki-dōji and Watanabe no Tsuna engage in a prolonged fight and while they grappled, Raikō decapitated Ibaraki-dōji. The female prisoners are liberated and the warriors return triumphant.

=== Subordinates ===
In this version, Ibaraki-dōji, who is famous in his own right, plays the role of one of Shuten-dōji's henchmen. There are also four other underlings dubbed Shuten-dōji's "Four Divine Kings": Hoshikuma-dōji, Kuma-dōji, Torakuma-dōji, and Kane-dōji.

Shuten-dōji, after telling the story of his own life, recounts the famous episode where Ibaraki-dōji goes to the capital city and has his arm severed by Watanabe no Tsuna (one of Raikō's men). Later on, Raikō decapitated Ibaraki-dōji who was wrestling with Tsuna.

Shuten-dōji's "Four Divine Kings" (shitennō) are described by the laundress-girl, so Raikō's group is aware of their existence in advance. Their names, together with their meanings were: Hoshikuma-dōji (Star-Bear Demon), Kuma-dōji (Bear Demon), Torakuma-dōji (Tiger-Bear Demon), and Kane-dōji (Iron Demon).

=== Named swords and arms ===
Warriors would conceal their armor and swords, many of which have been given proper names, in their oi (portable chests; "panniers" according to Reider).

Raikō's chest contained the sword Chisui (ちすゐ, assumed to be "血吸", thus "Bloodsucker"), vermilion armor (hiodoshi) called randen gusari (らんでん鎖, Randen Chain), and a vermilion helmet called Shishiō ("Lion King" or "Lion Lord".) Hōshō's contained a two-foot halberd (ko-naginata) called Iwakiri (Cutting Rock or Stonecutter). Tsuna had a sword named Onikiri (Cutting Demon or Demon Slasher) and yellow-green set of armor and helmet. (Note: The color of Tsuna's armor and helmet are moegi (萌黄) to be more precise.)

A real existing tachi (Japanese long sword) named Dōjigiri, which is one of the Five Best Swords under Heaven and designated national treasure of Japan, is associated with the tradition of being the sword that killed Shuten-dōji. (Note: Dōjigiri should be equatable to Chisui by logic, but scholarly notes on this is scant. One book that makes this reference is an illustrated book on swords by comic-book artist Kurogane Hiroshi who has frequently created work on historical subjects.) Tada Shrine also has a tachi, Onikirimaru, which has a legend that it defeated Shuten-dōji. (Note: Onikirimaru has the same name as another name of Higekiri, but they are different swords.) Kitano Tenmangū Shrine owns tachi that has been handed down as Onikiri (also known as Higekiri) described in this tradition.

In the Otogi Bunko text discussed here however, since many swords attack Shuten-dōji and sever his head, it is not clear who or which sword is to be credited with the decapitation.

== Analysis ==
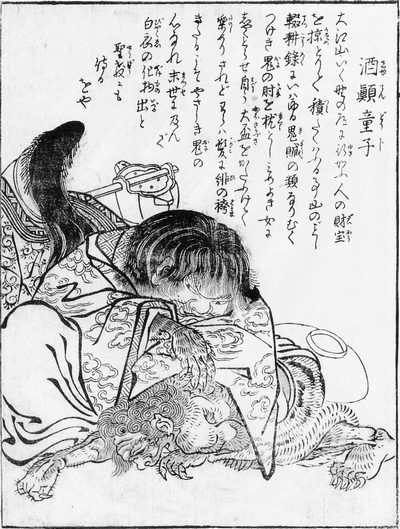
Toriyama Sekien "Shuten-dōji" (酒顚童子) from Konjaku Gazu Zoku Hyakki.

=== The Three Great Yōkai ===
It has been said that Shuten-dōji was the strongest oni of Japan. Academic folklorist Kazuhiko Komatsu has counted Shuten-dōji among the three most feared yōkai in medieval Kyoto, alongside the vixen Tamamo-no-Mae and the demon Ōtakemaru. (Note: Komatsu introduces them thus: "中世の人びと、それも都人にたずねたら、次の三つの妖怪の名があがるだろう。(If you asked the people of the medieval period, particularly the people of the capital (Kyoto), they would surely name the following three yōkai)".)

Komatsu suggests that these yōkai were considered exceptional because they received special treatment after their defeat. He explains that their remains, or parts of them, were kept as "treasures" by the ruling class in Kyoto, centered around the Emperor. These remains were stored in the treasure house of Byodo-in Temple in Uji, built by Fujiwara no Yorimichi, symbolizing the rulers' power.

The preservation of the demon's head and the fox's remains in the treasure house can be seen as a victory trophy, similar to the way fish prints or taxidermy animals are kept. It is believed that among the many demons defeated in the Middle Ages, the most formidable ones were deemed worthy of being stored in the Uji treasure house, representing military might, intelligence, and divine protection that surpassed even the spiritual strength of these powerful yōkai.

=== Origin theory ===
Historian Masaaki Takahashi interprets the cave within Mt. Oe, where Shuten-doji resides, as a boundary between the living and the dead, suggesting his palace is situated in a mystical realm or the underworld. He likens it to the Dragon Palace. Takahashi also associates the legend with the smallpox epidemic of 994 and finds parallels with other tales, such as the story of Chiyou from Records of the Grand Historian and the Ming dynasty's The Record of Chen Xunquan's Loss of His Wife.

There is a depiction of Shuten-doji drinking human blood like sake, which Takahashi believes could stem from the story of a German named Stein Dotsch, shipwrecked in Tango. The red wine Dotsch drank might have been mistaken for "living blood." This idea likely originated from the short story Shuten-doji, published in Weekly Asahi in 1952, where the Westerner, shipwrecked on Tango's shores, drank wine that resembled blood.

=== Relationship with Fujiwara Yasumasa ===
In earlier versions of the Shuten-doji legend, Minamoto no Yorimitsu, who defeated the demon, and Fujiwara no Yasumasa were portrayed as equals. According to the Mido Kanpakuki, on March 8, 1017 (April 7, 1017), Yorimitsu's younger brother, Yorichika, killed Yasumasa's retainer, KIYOHARA no Munenobu (Sei Shonagon’s older brother). In the Kojidan (vol. 2-57), a story based on this event, Munenobu is killed by one of Yorimitsu's Four Heavenly Kings, suggesting a rivalry between Yorimitsu and Yasumasa.

Additionally, texts like Hogen Monogatari, Umematsuron (vol. 2), and Isei Teikin Orai also list "Tamura (Sakanoue no Tamuramaro), Toshihito (Fujiwara no Toshihito), Yorimitsu, and Yasumasa" as a group of famous generals from ancient times. This connection is echoed in Kanze Nobumitsu’s play Rashomon, where Yasumasa and Watanabe no Tsuna are depicted arguing.

However, from the mid-Muromachi to the Sengoku periods, Raiko and his Four Heavenly Kings replaced Yasumasa as the main figures in the slaying of Shuten-doji, with Yasumasa being relegated to a supporting role. In the Otogi-zoshi version of Shuten-doji, Yasumasa is depicted as one of Raiko’s retainers alongside the Four Heavenly Kings, a portrayal that became widely accepted in later generations. Some stories, like the legend of the "Hōshō Sword" of the Chiba clan (from the Nanboku-chō period), even credit Yasumasa alone with the defeat of Shuten-doji.

== Local folklore ==
Shuten-dōji, according to one legend, was born at Ganbara, Echigo. However, there is also the idea that from the base of Mount Ibuki, where in literature like the Nihon Shoki, in the legend of the defeat of the giant snake Yamata no Orochi to Susanoo in a battle, it fled from Izumo to Ōmi, had a child with a wealthy person's daughter, with that child was Shuten-doji. Both father and son had a matchless thirst for sake, which is often cited as support.

=== Niigata ===
According to the Otogi Bunko version as previously described, Shuten-dōji originally came from Echigo Province (now Niigata Prefecture) and, had lived since the Heian period (8th century) when Dengyō Daishi and Kōbō-Daishi were active. Local legends elaborate that he was a page of the Kokojou-ji (国上寺) (in Tsubame, Niigata) (at the base of Mt. Kugami, there is a Chigo-dō where he is said to have passed through).

One story is that he was the son of a blacksmith in Echigo, that he was in his mother's womb for 16 months, and that he had teeth and hair when he was born, was immediately able to walk, was able to talk on the level of a 5–6 year old, had the wisdom and physical strength of a 16-year-old, and had a rough temperament, and due to this unusually ready wit, was shunned as an "oni child". According to Zentaiheiki, afterwards, when he was 6 years of age, he was abandoned by his mother, wandered from place to place, and then walked the path towards being an oni. There is also a legend that since he was scorned as an oni child, he was put into custody of a temple, but the chief priest of that temple was a user of unorthodox practices, and the child became an oni through learning those unorthodox practices, that he exhausted the limits of evil.

In the town of Wanou (presently, Niigata, Niigata), it is said that when a pregnant woman eats a fish called "tochi", that child will become a robber if it is a boy, and a prostitute if it is a girl. It is also said that a woman who ate the fish, gave birth to a child after it stayed 16 months in her womb, and that child was Shuten-doji. In Wanou, there are place names like the Dōji estate and the Dōji field.

=== Mount Ibuki, Shiga ===
Some versions of the legend localize Mount Ibuki in Ōmi Province (now Shiga Prefecture).

He, who was born from the large snake Yamata no Orochi (in its avatar as the myōjin of Mount Ibuki) and a human girl, was a page at Mount Hiei from an early age, and underwent training, but he drank sake which was forbidden by Buddhism, and in fact was a big drinker, and was therefore hated by everyone. One day, after a religious festival where he dressed in an oni costume, he was about to take off the costume, but he was not able to since it was stuck to his face, and reluctantly went into some mountain recesses where he started his life as an oni. He then met Ibaraki-dōji, and together aimed for Kyoto.

=== Nara Prefecture ===
He was a page for the Byakugō-ji in the Yamato Province (now Nara Prefecture), but found a corpse at a nearby mountain, and due to curiosity, brought that meat back to the temple, and made his priest teacher eat it without telling him that it was human meat. Afterwards, the page frequently brought back meat, not only from the flesh of corpses, but also by murdering live humans and returning with their flesh. The priest, who thought that it was suspicious, followed after the page, discovered the truth, harshly criticized the page, and abandoned him in a mountain. The page later became Shuten-dōji, and it has been said that the place where he was abandoned was thus called chigo-saka (page-hill).

According to another theory, he was a child of the chief priest of Byakugō-ji, but as he matured, he grew fangs and a horn, and later became a child as rough as a beast. The priest was embarrassed by this child, so the child was abandoned, but the child later came to Mount Ōoe, and became Shuten-dōji.

=== Kyoto Prefecture ===
==== Mount Ōe legend ====
From the Heian period to the Kamakura period, he was an oni who lawlessly ran amok in the capital, and he was based in Mount in the Tanba Province, or the Ōe in Nishikyō-ku, Kyoto, also known as Oi no Saka (老ノ坂) (within the Rakusai district of Kyoto) as well as the neighboring Shinochōōji, Kameoka. For the legend of the Mount Ōe in Tanba Province, there is a theory that it was a misrepresentation of the bandits within Ōe who harassed passing travelers.

==== Oi-no-saka ====
According to local legend, Yorimitsu and the others returned with the head back to the capital, but at Oi-no-Saka (老ノ坂, "Slope of Aging") by the Mount Ōe on the south edge of Kyoto city, (Note: Not the Mount Ōe specified in the Otogi Bunko version, northwest of Kyoto.) they were warned by a roadsize image of Jizō, "don't bring something unclean into the capital", and as the head was not able to move anymore, they all buried the head right there. Another theory is that when Dōji was dying, regretting his crimes until then, desired to help various people who had illnesses in their head, that he was deified as a great wisdom god (daimyōjin). As this is the Kubitsuka Daimyōjin of the Oi no Saka slope, according to legends, it would perform miracles for illnesses in the head.

==== Others ====
It has also been said that he was buried in Mount Ōe in Fukuchiyama, Kyoto, which is the origin of the Onidake-inari-san jinja (鬼岳稲荷山神社).

Nariaiji temple in Kyoto Prefecture preserves the sake bottle and sake cup allegedly used to pour the Shinbenkidokushu (the sake that "poisoned" Shuten-dōji).

== Relation to Ibaraki-dōji ==
Shuten-dōji rampaged together in Kyoto along with Ibaraki-dōji, but there are actually several theories about their relation. One of those theories is that Ibaraki-dōji was not a male oni, but a female oni, and that Ibaraki-dōji was a lover of his son, or Shuten-dōji himself. Therefore, it has been said that Shuten-dōji and Ibaraki-dōji knew of each other's existence, and aimed for the capital together.

== See also ==
- Tenka-goken (Five Swords under Heaven) - Dōjigiri was said to be used to kill Shuten-dōji
