= Dōjigiri =

Ancient Japanese sword

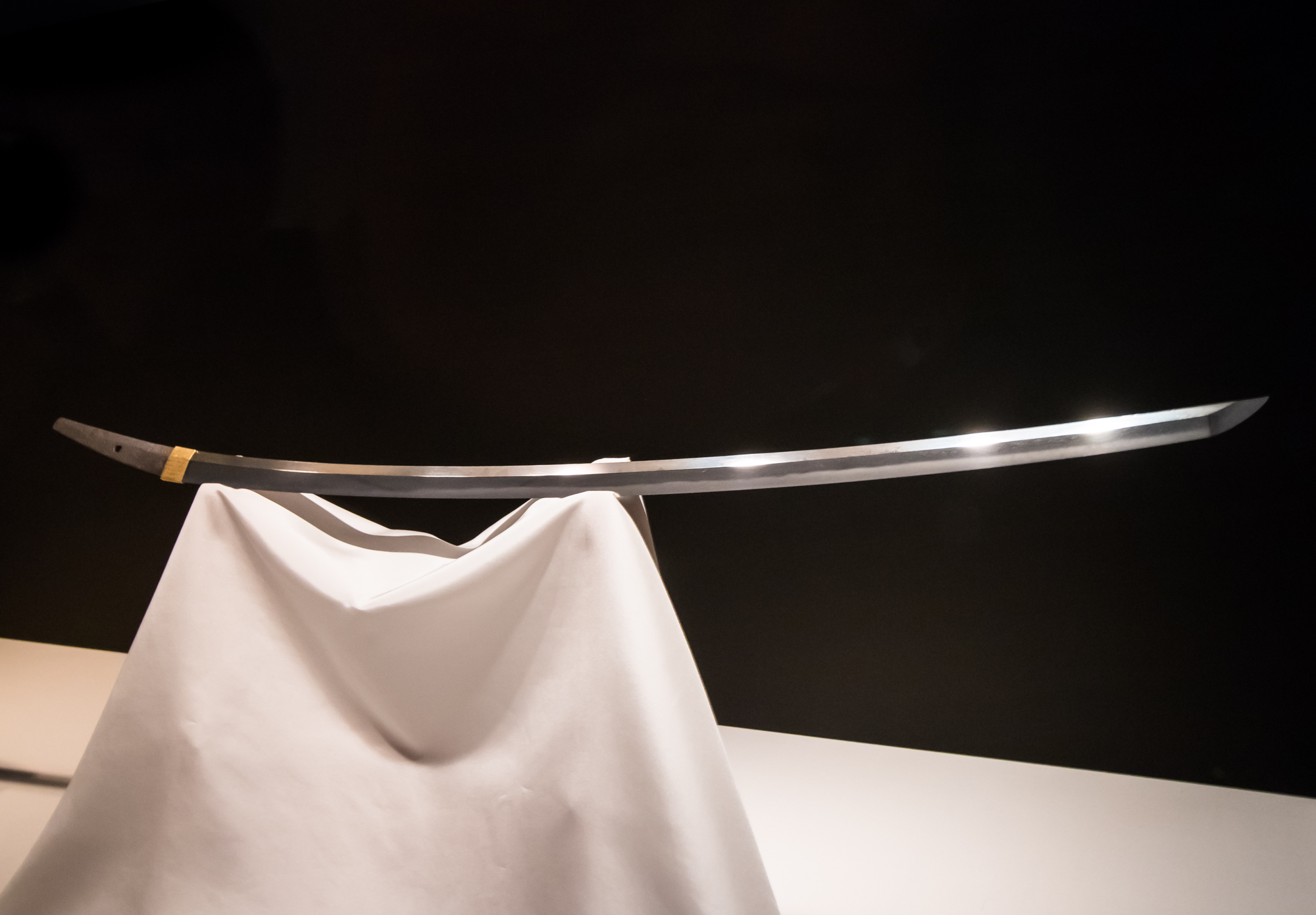
Tachi "Dōjigiri" (童子切, "Slayer of Shuten-dōji"), a National Treasure showcased in the Tokyo National Museum. The sword was forged in the 10-12th centuries by the swordsmith Hōki-no-Kuni Yasutsuna (伯耆国安綱).

Dōjigiri (童子切, "Slayer of Shuten-dōji") is a tachi-type Japanese sword that has been identified as a National Treasure of Japan. This sword is one of the "Five Swords Under Heaven" (天下五剣 Tenka-Goken).

Dōjigiri is sometimes called "the yokozuna of all Japanese swords" along with Ōkanehira (ja:大包平) because of its perfection; it is of great historical value as one of the oldest extant katana-type weapons. The quality and the artistic value of the blade is exquisite, it has been kept in good preservation, and the legend tied to the sword is notable.

== Anatomy ==
The present mounts of the Dojigiri are fine examples of Momoyama-period work in itomaki no tachi style, in which the typical wrapping of the hilt continues along part of the scabbard. The scabbard is decorated in gold nashiji (gold flakes suspended in transparent lacquer) and the metal fittings are of shakudo (a blue-black alloy of copper with a small percentage of gold) worked with a nanako (granulated) ground and bearing the imperial paulownia mon (family badge or crest) in gilt.

It is perhaps the most celebrated of all Japanese swords.

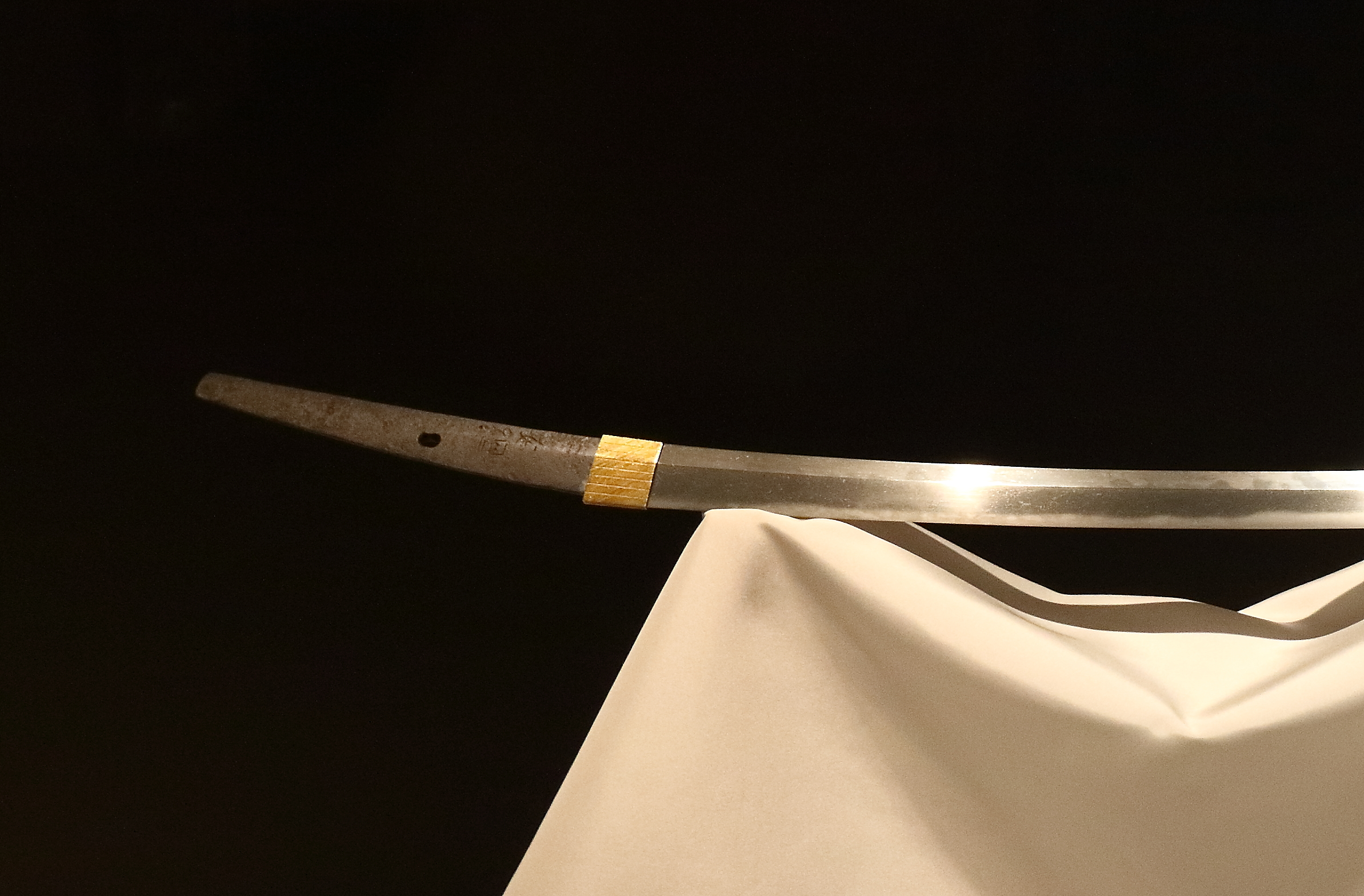
Length: 80 cm; curvature: 2.7 cm; 10-12th centuries (Heian period).

== History ==
Dōjigiri was presented to Oda Nobunaga, the leading late sixteenth century general (1534-82), by the Ashikaga family. Subsequently it was the property, in turn, of Toyotomi Hideyoshi and Tokugawa Ieyasu. The second Tokugawa shogun, Hidetada, bestowed it on the daimyo Matsudaira Tadanao (1595-1650) of Echizen. After the disgrace and dispossession of the Echizen Matsudaira occasioned by some irregular conduct on the part of Tadanao, the blade passed to the Tsuyama branch of the family.

== Legends ==
The Kyōhō Era Handbook of Famous Works (Japanese: Kyōhō meibutsuchō) records the legend that this sword was used by the great warrior Minamoto Yorimitsu to bring down the monstrous Shuten Dōji of Mt. Ōe in Tanba, thus earning the epithet of "Dōji-slaying Yasutsuna" (Japanese: Dōjigiri Yasutsuna). The legend of the Shuten Dōji — either a demon or a highwayman — is thought to date to the Muromachi period (1392–1573).

== See also ==
- List of National Treasures of Japan (crafts-swords)
- Japanese sword
