= Ooe (video game) =

2025 video game

- Ooe promotional artwork, featuring the protagonist Oosaki
- Developer: ADELTA
- Publishers: JP: ADELTA; WW: MangaGamer (Windows); WW: Dramatic Create (Switch)
- Director: Rinko Kurosawa
- Platforms: Microsoft Windows; Nintendo Switch
- Release: JP: April 19, 2025; WW: December 24, 2026
- Genres: BL game, visual novel
- Mode: Single-player

Ooe (大穢) is a Japanese BL visual novel developed by doujin circle ADELTA. The game was originally released in two parts. The first part of the game was released for Windows PCs, on October 25, 2024. Later followed by the release for the complete edition of the game in April 19, 2025, which included the previously released first part and expanding the number of character routes.

An English localization for Windows was announced by MangaGamer in 2025 during their Anime Expo panel. A Nintendo Switch version, published by Dramatic Create who have worked with their previous release, Hashihime of the Old Book Town, was announced in August 2026. The port is scheduled for release on December 24, 2026, and will include new material, additional voice acting, and localization in English, Traditional Chinese, Simplified Chinese and Korean.

== Gameplay ==
Ooe is a BL visual novel that features mystery and horror elements. Like most visual novels, the gameplay primarily consists of reading text on the screen representing either narration or dialogue, accompanied by sprites, background art, and CG illustrations. Further choices to go through different routes can be unlocked as the story progresses.

The complete edition of the game features nine romanceable character routes, with two characters having separate ending variations, and an unlockable route at the end of the game plus additional story content. The game is described as a mystery horror work featuring "nine criminals and one detective", set on an isolated island, to discover the true culprit behind the murder mystery.

== Synopsis ==
Set in 1955 during the mid period of the Shōwa era, the second anniversary for the death of late actress, Ooe Ann is being commemorated on Ooejima, a remote island located beyond Hachijō-jima. The protagonist, Oosaki, a detective, is hired to attend a memorial service on behalf of his client.

Upon arriving, Oosaki joins nine other attendees on the island. The gathering takes a drastic turn after the absence of the host, transportation failing to arrive and the group finding the servant dead. As rumours spread among the group and further incidents occur, Oosaki and the other attendees attempt to identify the perpetrator while revealing their relationships and connections to the deceased, together with their dark past and crimes.

== Development and release ==
Ooe was developed by ADELTA, the doujin circle founded by the scenario writer, illustrator and the composer, Rinko Kurosawa. It is the circle's new BL game followed after the release of their known earlier works such as Hashihime of the Old Book Town and Uuultra C. The first part of the game was released in Japan on October 25, 2024, for Microsoft Windows, then followed by the release of the complete edition in April 19, 2025, which is also available as free update for players who have bought the first part.

A Nintendo Switch port of the game was announced in August 2026, published by Dramatic Create, and will be released worldwide on December 26, 2026, including additional voice acting and support for other languages.

== Related media ==
=== Manga ===
A manga adaptation titled Ooe: Ariake-hen (大穢 ～有明篇～) began serialization in Kadokawa's Young Ace magazine on September 4, 2026. The manga is illustrated by Medamayaki and focused on the Ariake's route storyline from the visual novel. Its first chapter appeared in the October 2026 issue of Young Ace, which was released on September 4, 2026. The issue featured the manga as its cover feature, new serialization and lead-color work.
