= Tango-Amanohashidate-Ōeyama Quasi-National Park =

Protected area in Kyōto Prefecture, Japan

Coordinates: 35°34′02″N 135°11′23″E

- 丹後天橋立大江山国定公園
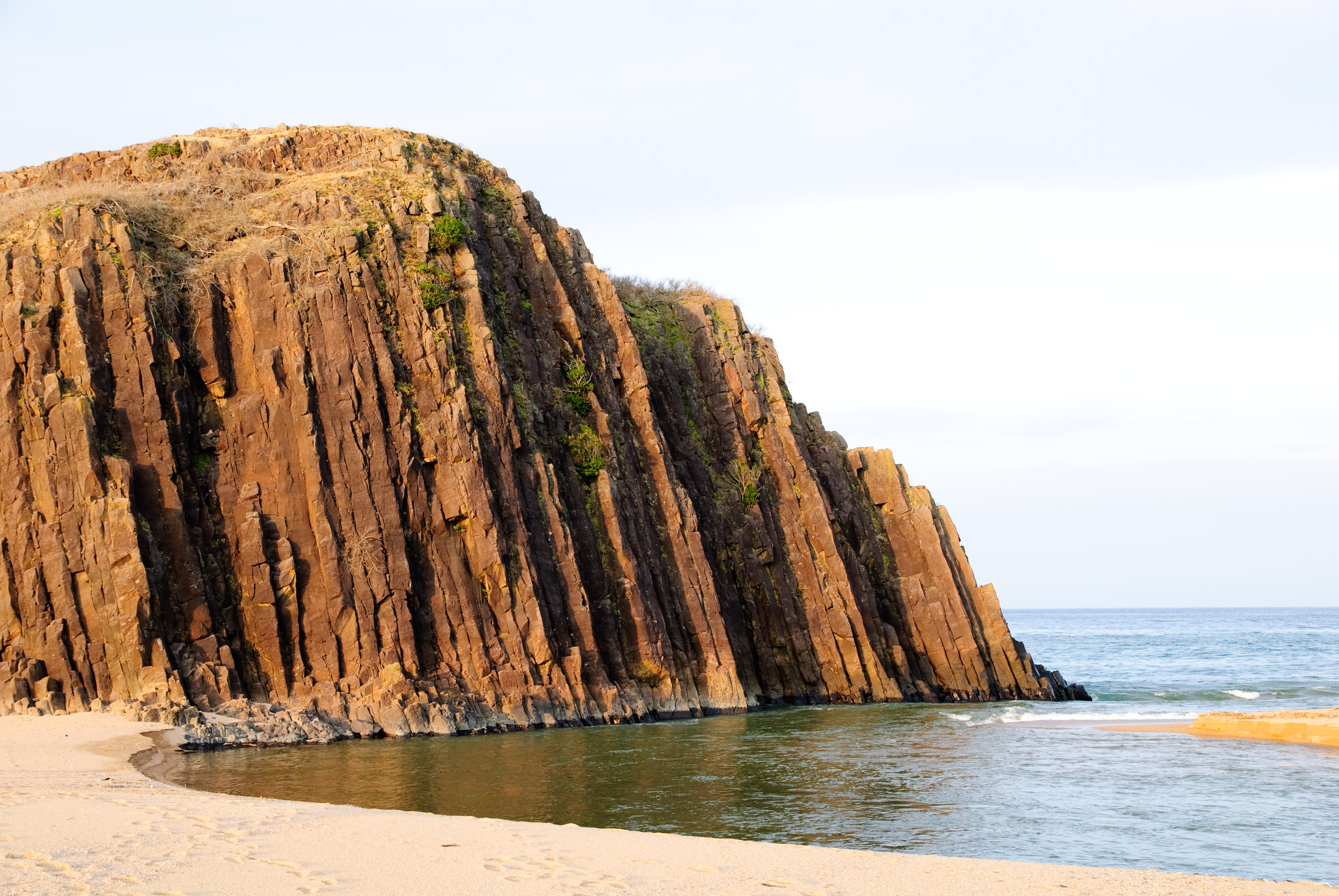
- Tate-iwa
- Interactive map of Tango-Amanohashidate-Ōeyama Quasi-National Park
- Location: Kyōto Prefecture, Japan
- Area: 190.23 km^{2} (73.45 sq mi)
- Established: 3 August 2007

Tango-Amanohashidate-Ōeyama Quasi-National Park (丹後天橋立大江山国定公園, Tango-Amanohashidate-Ōeyama Kokutei Kōen) is a Quasi-National Park in northern Kyōto Prefecture, Japan. Established in 2007, the park comprises a number of non-contiguous areas of the former Tango Province, with a central focus on Mount Ōe (大江山) and Amanohashidate, one of the Three Views of Japan.

== Sites of interest ==
- Aoshima (青島), Kehara terraces, Kotobikihama (琴引浜), Tango Matsushima

== Related municipalities ==
- Fukuchiyama, Ine, Kyōtango, Maizuru, Miyazu, Yosano

== See also ==
- National Parks of Japan
- Wakasa Wan Quasi-National Park
