= Ōtenta =

Ōtenta (大典太; or Ōdenta) is a Japanese sword specified among the National Treasures of Japan. The sword is one of the Tenka Goken ("Five Swords Under Heaven"). The sword was a treasure of the Ashikaga shogunate. After the Ashikaga shogunate fell, the sword was in the custody of the Maeda clan.

== See also ==
- List of National Treasures of Japan (crafts-swords)

== Works cited ==
- Agency for Cultural Affairs, ed. (30 July 2000). 国宝・重要文化財大全 [Complete Guide to National Treasures and Important Cultural Properties] (in Japanese). Vol. 別. The Mainichi Newspapers Company. ISBN 9784620803333.
- Maeda Ikutokukai, ed. (30 March 2012). 国宝 名物大典太・名物太郎作正宗・名物富田郷〈刀剣三振〉 [National Treasures: Famous Odenta, Famous Taro Masamune, Famous Tomita Go (Three Swords)] (in Japanese). Bensei Shuppan. ISBN 978-4-585-22532-4. NCID BB10021336.
