= Hashihime of the Old Book Town =

2016 video game

- Hashihime of the Old Book Town cover art, featuring the protagonist Tamamori
- Developer: ADELTA
- Publishers: JP: ADELTA (Windows); JP: Dramatic Create (Vita); WW: Dramatic Create (Switch); WW: MangaGamer
- Director: Rinko Kurosawa
- Platforms: Microsoft Windows; PlayStation Vita; Nintendo Switch
- Release: JP: August 13, 2016; WW: September 26, 2019
- Genres: BL game, visual novel
- Mode: Single-player

Hashihime of the Old Book Town (Note: Japanese: 古書店街の橋姫, Hepburn: Koshotengai no Hashihime) is a Japanese BL visual novel developed by doujin circle ADELTA. It was first released for Windows PCs in Japan on August 13, 2016. A version of the visual novel aimed at ages 17 and above titled Hashihime of the Old Book Town append was released by Dramatic Create for the PlayStation Vita, only in Japan, on September 27, 2018, and later ported to the Nintendo Switch worldwide, on December 16, 2021, adding new short stories for each existing routes and toned down the sexual content.

In 2019, an English localization of the game was released by MangaGamer for Windows PCs.

== Gameplay ==
A screenshot from the game, showing Kawase having a conversation with Tamamori.

Like most visual novels, Hashihime of the Old Book Town consists primarily of reading text accompanied by sprites, background art, and CG illustrations. The game includes multiple routes, with an emphasis on mystery, psychological drama, and BL romance themes. The narrative blends elements of fantasy, hallucination, and metafiction, encouraging replay to uncover the full chronology of events.

== Synopsis ==
Set in Taishō era, in June 1922 during the rainy season, Tamamori arrives in Jinbōchō with dreams of entering the Imperial University. After failing the entrance exam, he settles into a second-hand bookstore called Umebachidō, where he writes manuscripts and hallucinates while living off acquaintances from his hometown.

Strange events begin to unfold his friends die under inexplicable circumstances, and Tamamori realizes he is reliving the same three rainy days over again. As he unravels the mysteries around him, he must distinguish reality from illusion and decide whether he can alter fate.

== Characters ==
- Tamamori (玉森) is the primary protagonist of the game. He is 20 years old, a failed student who works at the used bookstore Umebachidō in Jinbōchō. Daydreamer and aspiring writer, the story is told from his perspective and his experiences with the repeating rainy three-day loop drive the narrative.
- Minakami (水上) is one of Tamamori's childhood friends, a 21-year-old gentle, bookish student who attends the Imperial University. Kind, somewhat bumbling, and devoted to books. His presence is emotionally important to Tamamori as he mostly appreciates his works.
- Kawase (川瀬) is a 20-year-old genius student who attends the Imperial University's medical department. A childhood friend of Tamamori and Minakami; intelligent, sarcastic, and emotionally complex. He mostly admires Hanazawa, likes making fun of Tamamori and criticising his works.
- Hanazawa (花澤), is a 23-year-old, serious and stoic former military cadet. A childhood friend of Tamamori; blunt, hot-blooded, and protective, with a strong passion of justice and righteousness for his nation. Also a best friend of Hikawa, where they also work together in the Army Scientific Research Unit.
- Hikawa Kijuurou (氷川 喜重郎, Hikawa Kijūrō) often referred to as "Hakase" / "Professor"; a 24-year-old eyepatch-wearing inventor. Polite, nervous, and brilliant, he's involved in the story's more scientific/occult investigations. Appears to have become a regular customer at the Umebachidō only after Tamamori started working there.
- Man in a Noh Mask (能面の男, Nōmen no Otoko); a mysterious, taciturn figure who lives in the bookstore's basement and wears a Noh mask. Violent and enigmatic; he figures centrally in the darker, supernatural events and is tied into Tamamori's routes.

== Development ==
Hashihime of the Old Book Town was created by doujin circle ADELTA, written and illustrated by Rinko Kurosawa. It was released in Japan on August 13, 2016, for Microsoft Windows. A PlayStation Vita port of the game called Hashihime of the Old Book Town append was published by Dramatic Create, a brand of HuneX, on September 27, 2018. On December 16, 2021, the game released worldwide on Nintendo Switch by the same publisher, featuring new short stories of every routes.

On September 11, 2024, Dramatic Create released Hashihime of the Old Book Town append fullscreen worldwide on Windows PCs and Nintendo Switch. It is a digital version of two previously released supplementary readers with extra content added, featuring detailed profiles of each character, explanations of all the routes and illustrations.

== Related media ==
=== Manga ===
A manga adaptation illustrated by Itonoco started serializing in Cool-B VOL.98. A digital edition with all eleven main chapters and three prequal chapters released on July 28, 2023.

=== Drama CDs ===
Numerous drama CDs have been released; each one features recitation of every novels mentioned in the game by each love interests.

== See also ==
- Dogra Magra - A novel by Yumeno Kyūsaku which is often referred to within the story.
- Jimbōchō Book Town
- Japanese detective fiction
- Hashihime
