= Tenka-Goken =

Group of five Japanese swords

The Tenka-Goken (天下五剣; "Five Swords under Heaven") are a group of five Japanese swords. Three are National Treasures of Japan, one is Imperial Property, and one is a holy relic of Nichiren Buddhism. Among the five, some regard Dōjigiri as "the yokozuna of all Japanese swords" along with Ōkanehira (ja:大包平).

== Origin ==
As of 2017, the term is widely-recognized among Japanese sword connoisseurs. For example, the national institute uses the word in an explanation for Mikazuki. Although some researchers claim the term dates back to the Muromachi period (1333–1573), its origin is unknown. Suiken Fukunaga cites a book Yorozu Kaimono Chohōki (万買物調方記) written in the fifth year of Genroku (1692–1693), so the term is traceable back to at least the late 17th century if the citation is to be believed.

Kanzan Sato commented, in terms of pure quality from the viewpoint of modern sword connoisseurs, although they are undoubtedly five of the greatest swords, it is doubtful whether they are the five greatest swords. He guessed the criteria of this selection include the values of legends associated to these famous swords.

== List ==
Sometimes the selection differs from the following list. For instance, a list by Kanzan Sato includes Ichigo-hitofuri Yoshimitsu (一期一振吉光), an Imperial Property of Japan, instead of Onimaru (although in other parts of the same book Sato contradicts himself and uses the same list as the following).

All five swords in this list are included in the Kyōhō Meibutsuchō, a sword catalogue commissioned by Tokugawa Yoshimune, the eighth shogun of the Tokugawa shogunate, and compiled by the Hon'ami clan, who were renowned authorities in sword appraisal. Swords listed in the Kyōhō Meibutsuchō are traditionally given the honorary title meibutsu (名物; "celebrated item"), which is prefixed to their names. Named Japanese swords are typically referred to in combination with the name of their swordsmith. For example, the Dōjigiri, one of the Tenka-Goken included in the catalogue, is referred to as Meibutsu Dōjigiri Yasutsuna (名物童子切安綱; "celebrated Dōjigiri Yasutsuna").

Name	Signature	Bladesmith	Classification	Note
Dōjigiri (童子切; "Slayer of Shuten-dōji")	安綱	Hōki-no-Kuni Yasutsuna (伯耆国安綱)	National Treasure	10–12th century. Tachi. Length 80.0 cm, curvature 2.7 cm. Owned by Tokyo National Museum. Legends say Minamoto no Yorimitsu killed the monster Shuten-dōji with this sword. Sometimes it is called "the yokozuna of all Japanese swords" because of its perfection; it is of great historical value as one of the oldest extant katana-type weapons, the quality and the artistic value of the blade is exquisite, it has been kept in good preservation, and the legend tied to the sword is notable.
Onimaru (鬼丸; "Demon Circle")	國綱	Awataguchi Sakon-no-Shōgen Kunitsuna (粟田口左近将監国綱)	Imperial Property	Tachi. Length 78.3 cm. Owned by the Imperial Household Agency. Along with Ōdenta and Futatsu-mei, the sword was considered to be one of the three regalia swords of the shōguns of the Ashikaga clan. The epic Taiheiki includes a story that the sword moved by itself and killed an oni demon who was cursing Hōjō Tokimasa, from which the name Onimaru came.
Mikazuki (三日月; "Crescent Moon")	三条	Sanjō Kokaji Munechika (三条小鍛冶宗近)	National Treasure	10–12th century. Tachi. Length 80 cm, curvature 2.7 cm, scabbard length 85.3 cm. Owned by Tokyo National Museum. It is called Mikazuki because of its "crescent-moon-shaped pattern (J. mikazuki) of the tempering". Stated to be the favorite sword of the 13th shōgun of the Ashikaga shogunate, Ashikaga Yoshiteru, and the sword with which he valiantly fought his final battle.
Ōdenta (大典太; "Great Denta" or "The Best among Swords Forged by Denta")	光世作	Miike Denta Mitsuyo (三池典太光世)	National Treasure	Tachi. Length 66.1 cm, curvature 2.7 cm. Owned by Maeda Ikutokukai. Along with Onimaru and Futatsu-mei, the sword was considered to be one of the three regalia swords of the shoguns of the Ashikaga clan. Later passed down to Maeda Toshiie. A legend says the sword healed a daughter of Toshiie and another legend says birds never try to approach to a warehouse where this sword is stored.
Juzumaru (数珠丸; "Rosary")	恒次	Aoe Tsunetsugu (青江恒次)	Important Cultural Property	Tachi. Length 81.08 cm, curvature 3.0 cm. Owned by Honkōji Temple, Amagasaki. The name came from a legend that Nichiren adorned the sword with a juzu (a loop of prayer beads) to cleanse evil spirits.

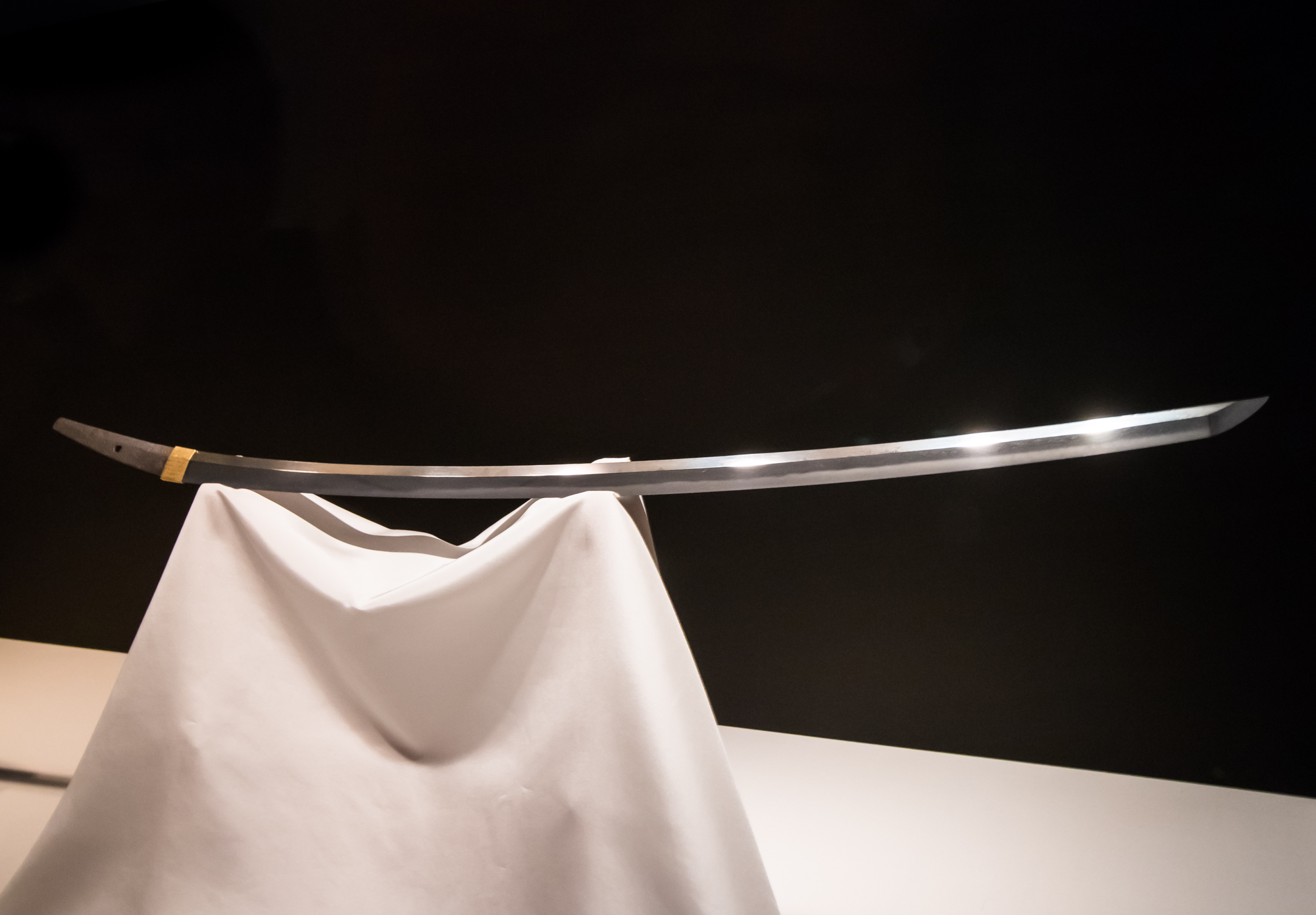
Dojikiri Yasutsuna

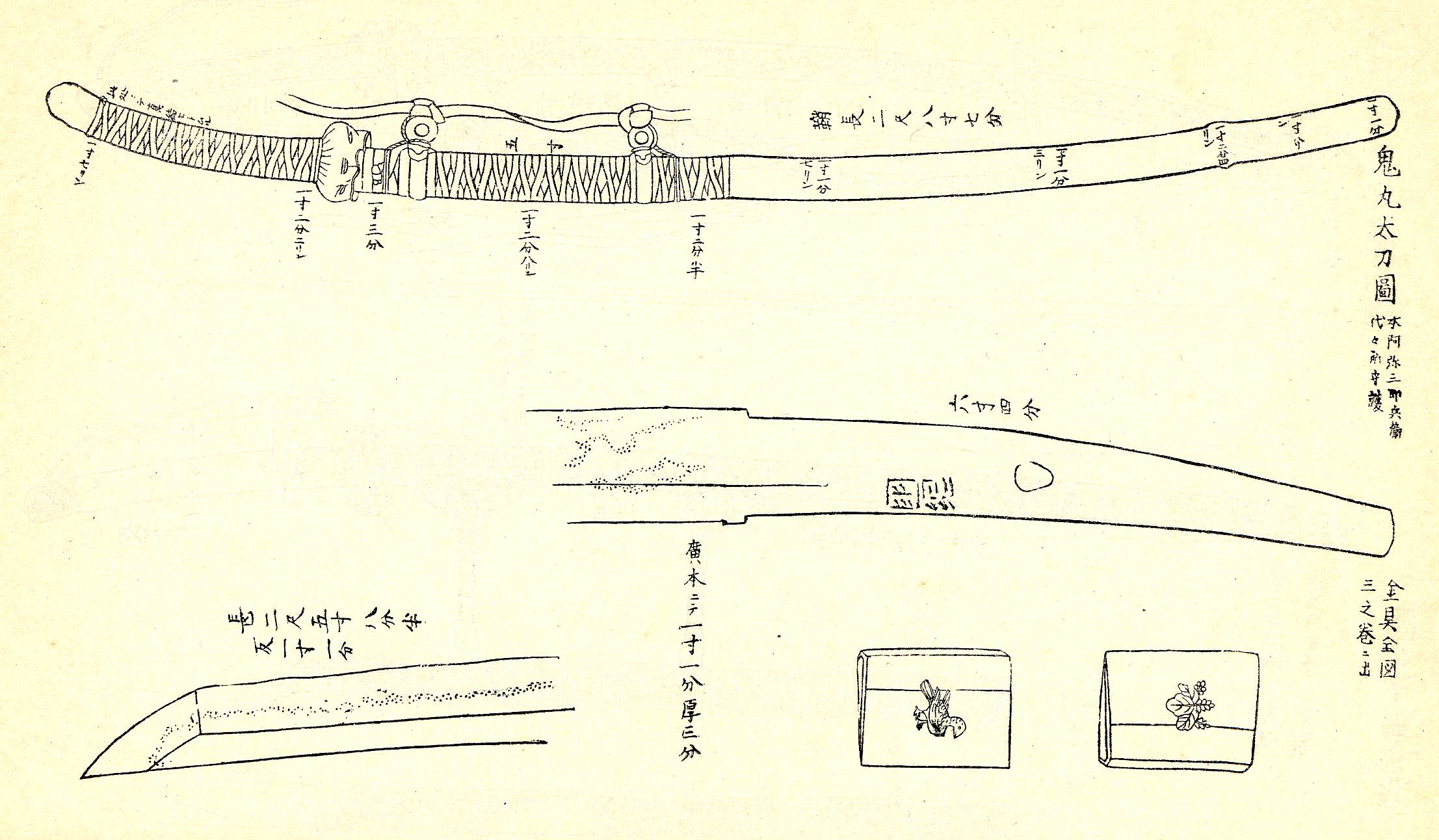
Onimaru Kunitsuna

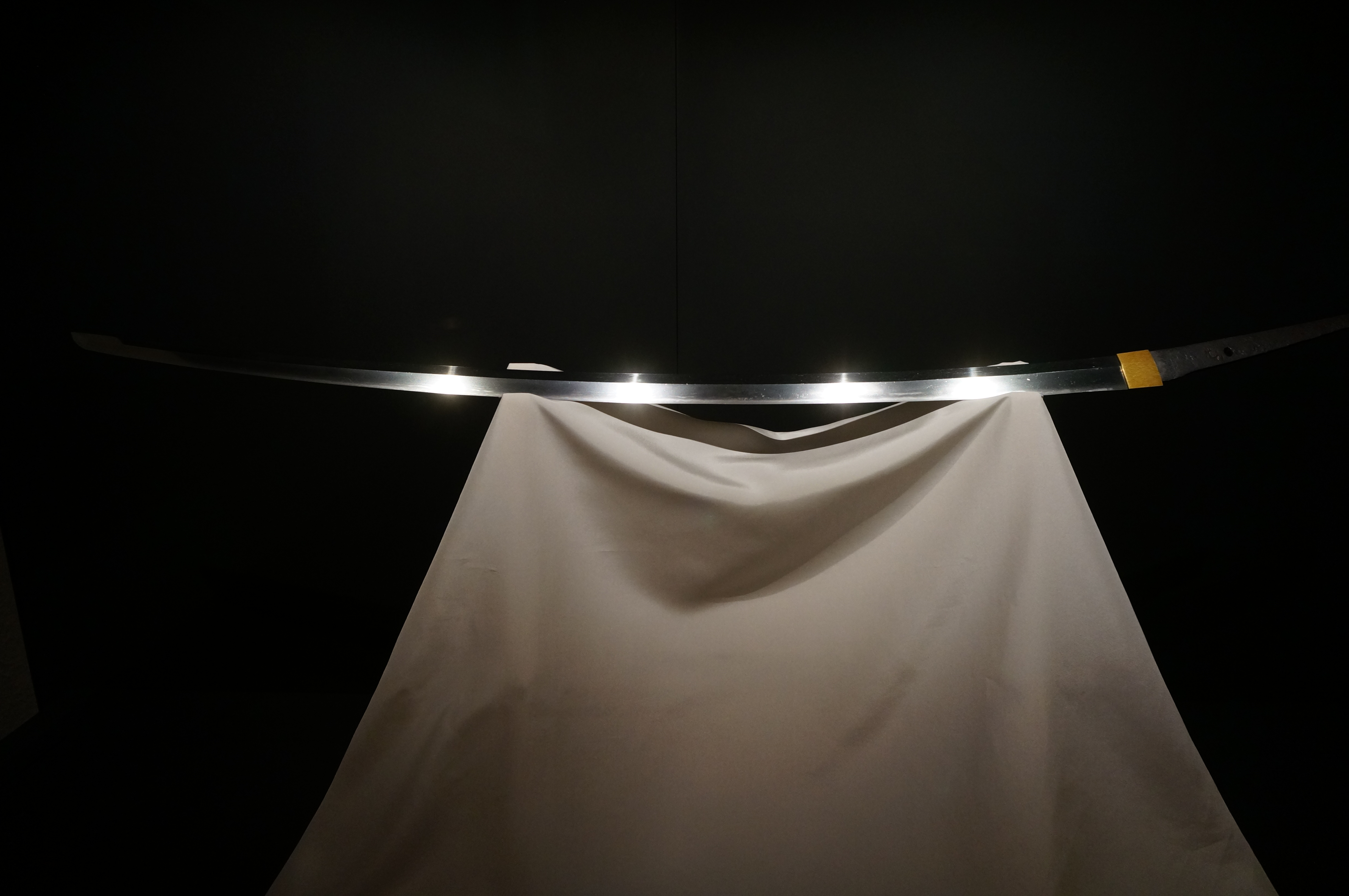
Mikazuki Munechika

== See also ==
- Three Great Spears of Japan
- Kusanagi-no-Tsurugi
