= Ōeyama (mountain range) =

Mountain range in Kyoto prefecture

Coordinates: 35°27′12″N 135°06′24″E

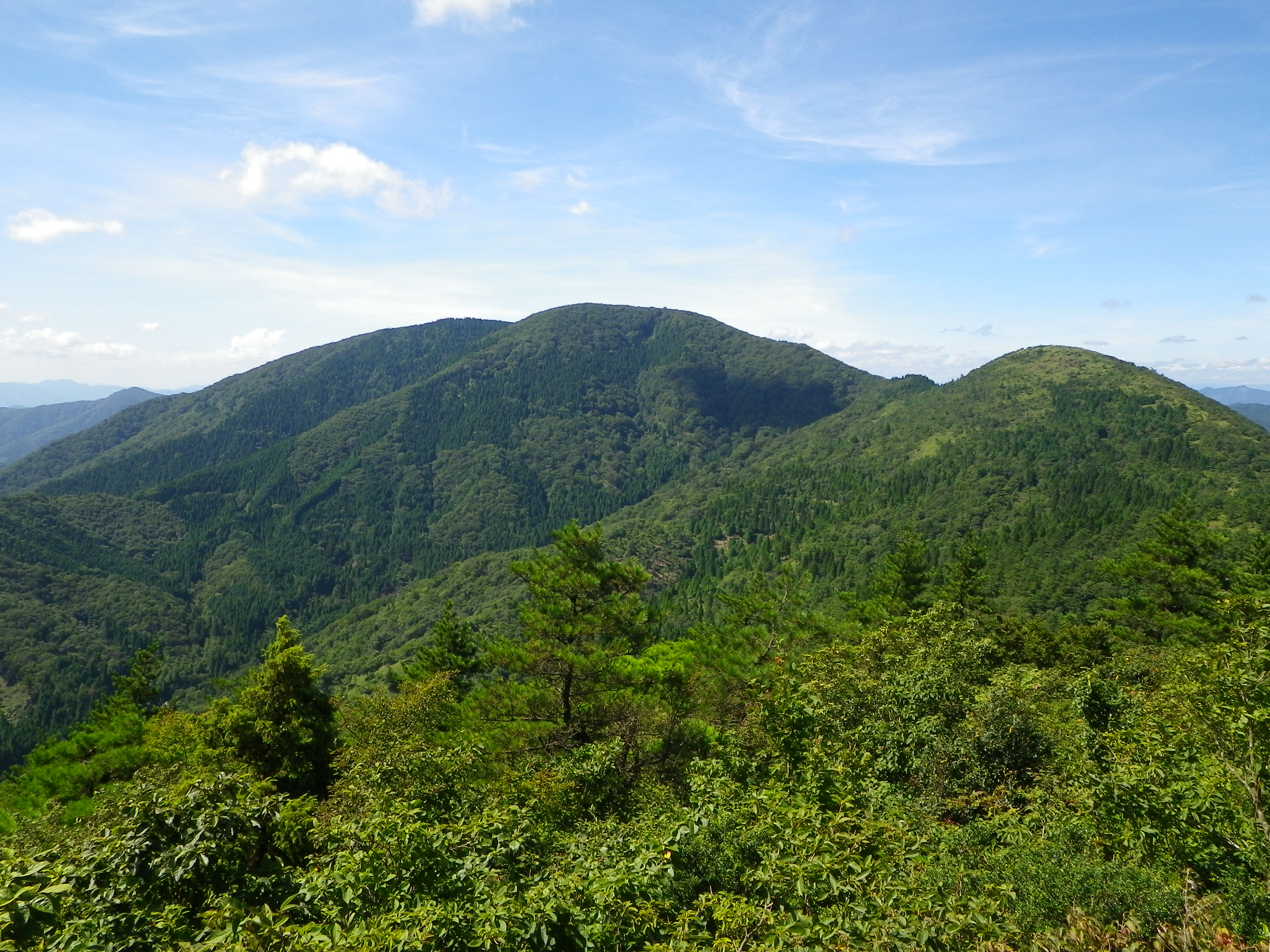
Ōeyama

Located at the base of the Tango Peninsula in Kyoto Prefecture, Ōeyama (大江山) mountain range extends over Yosano-cho, Fukuchiyama and Miyazu. The highest peak, Senjogatake (千丈ヶ嶽) has an elevation of 832.5 meters. The range is also called Yosa-no-oyama (与謝大山) and is best known for the legend of Shuten-dōji. It is also known for the sea of clouds that is visible from points of high elevation. On August 3, 2007, the mountain range was designated as a Quasi-National Park under the name Tango-Amanohashidate-Ōeyama Quasi-National Park.

== Ōeyama mines ==
The Ōeyama mountain range is geologically composed of stratum with basic bedrock pushed up deep from within the earth. The range is rich in metal veins, and place names related to metals such as 'kana-ya' (金屋, metal house) are common. In 1917, a mineral deposit was found in the mountain, mined for nickel, and used for producing weapons from 1933 to the end of the Pacific War. Minerals were carried by industrial railway (Kaya Railway) to a refinery in Iwataki-cho bordering the Sea of Japan. Many miners came from the Republic of China and Korea. In August 1998, sixteen Chinese miners filed a damage suit to the Kyoto District Court for the harsh forced labor. On September 29, 2004, Nippon Yakin Kogyo Co., (Tokyo Metropolitan Government) Ltd. paid the total amount of 21 million dollars for the settlement, and a reconciliation was partly effected at the Osaka High Court. However, on May 12, 2007, in the appeal hearing, the Supreme Court of Japan decided to completely dismiss the damage suit against the Japanese government. Some nickel mines were used as Allied prisoner of war camps until the end of World War II.

== Folklore ==
There are three legends of oni extermination in Ōeyama. One of the legends in the Kojiki holds that Emperor Sujin's brother Hikoimasuno-miko (日子坐王) exterminated Kugumimi-no-Mikasa (玖賀耳之御笠), a tsuchigumo. The second legend is that Prince Shōtoku's younger brother Imperial Prince Maroko defeated three ogres named Eiko (英胡), Karuashi (軽足) and Tsuchiguma (土熊). The third is the famous legend of Shuten-dōji (酒呑童子). Most believe that 'Ōeyama,' where Shuten-dōji resided, is a mountain along the Ōeyama range in Tango. However, some say it might have been a mountain along the San'indō on the border between Yamashiro Province and Tanba Provinces in Nishikyō-ku, Kyoto, which is spelled '大枝山' in kanji. The Japan Ogre Exchange Museum (日本の鬼の交流博物館) was built on the site of an abandoned copper mine at the foot of Ōeyama in 1993. The Tango region where the mountain range is located had close contacts with the Asian continent from ancient times, and immigrants were engaged in metal work; with their advanced technique in metal refining, and having accumulated a large fortune, those who recognized this in the capital sent an army to pillage the wealth, and rule the region. One theory holds that people created the tsuchigumo and oni extermination legends from these incidents in order to justify and glorify themselves; at the same time, some propose that immigrants were in fact called ogres because they gathered to become thieves and terrorized the region.
