= Ōeyama (mountain) =

Mountain in Kyoto prefecture

Coordinates: 34°58′49″N 135°38′26″E

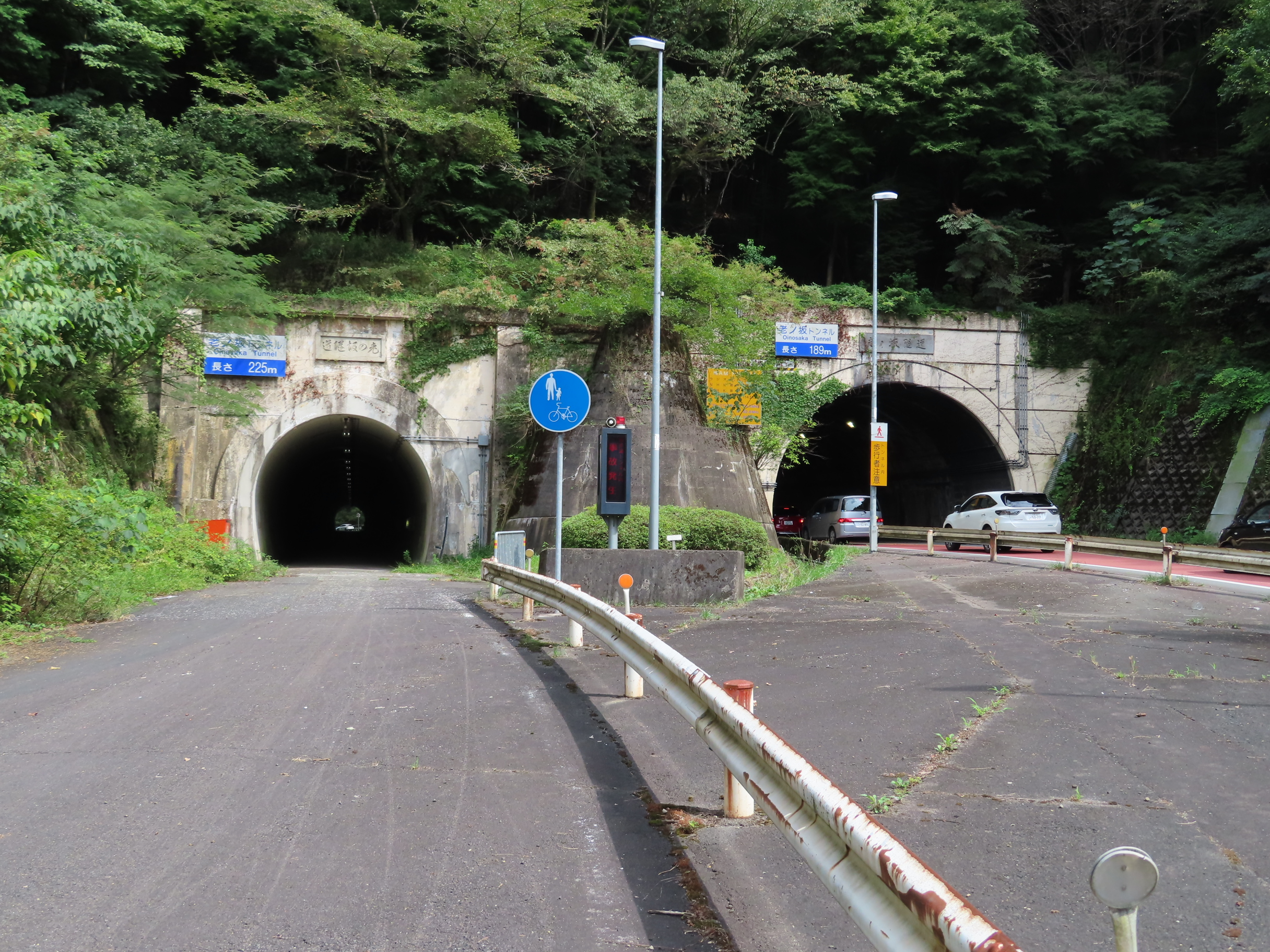
Oinosaka Tunnel, Ōeyama.

Ōeyama (Japanese: 大枝山), also known as Ooe-yama and Mount Ooe, is a mountain in Kyoto Prefecture, Japan. The mount is 480m high. The mountain is located in the boundary between Nishikyo Ward, Kyoto, and Kameoka. It is also called 大江山 (Ōeyama) (in Man'yōshū) or (大井山) Ōiyama (大井山) (in Nihon Kōki). Oinosaka-toge Pass (老ノ坂峠) is located on the north-side slope of this mountain. In the past, the slope where pass of Mt. Oe was called 'Oeno-saka Slope' (大江坂), but is now referred to as Oino-saka Slope (老の坂).

== History ==
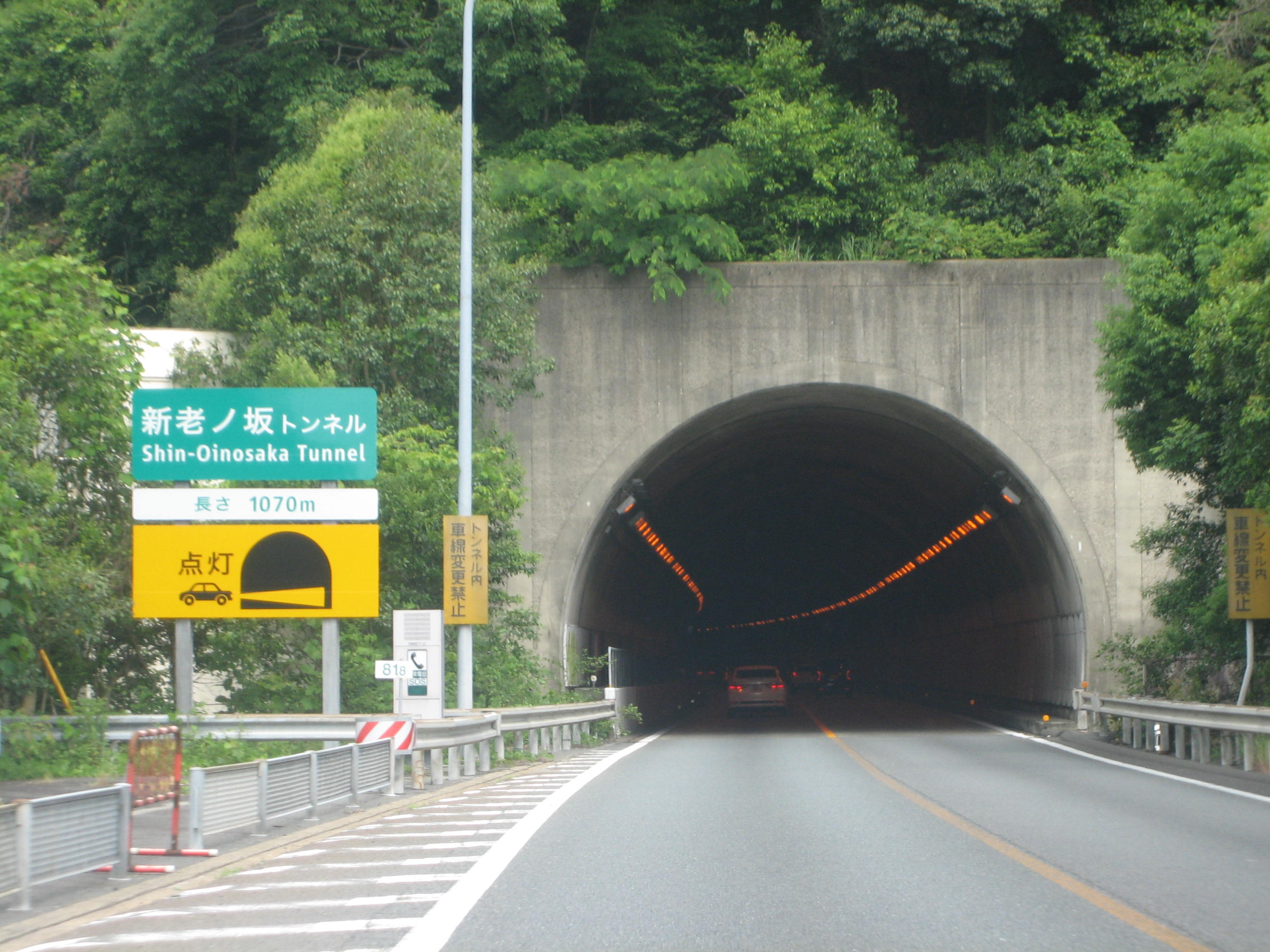
Shin Oinosaka Tunnel, Ōeyama.

Before the capital was moved to Heian-kyō, this route was used for going to Heijō-kyō via Yodo River. People using the San'indō Road from Heian-kyō, passed through Oeno-seki (the Oe gate station) placed on Oeno-saka Slope, located in the boundary between Yamashiro Province and Tanba Province, in order to bid farewell to the capital; therefore, it was known as a place of utamakura. Due to its strategic location from a transportation and military perspective, it was recorded that, in Jowa Incident and in Hōgen rebellion, many were stationed to prevent suspicious persons from entering or exiting the capital. It is also known that famous military commanders passed through here: it is said that Minamoto no Yoshitsune, Ashikaga Takauji attacking Rokuhara Tandai and Akechi Mitsuhide, passed through here on their way to battle. A sekisho (checking station) was placed here in the Muromachi period. This place was designated as one of Shisakai (four boundaries) to prevent unclean influences from outside from entering the Capital of Heian-kyo and to rid the capital of filth generated from within. For this reason, it was known that thieves ousted from Kyoto lived in the areas around Ōeyama and it was also believed that oni lived there as well. In the past, Kyoto and Kameoka were connected via Oino-saka-toge Pass, but now, the Shin-Oino-saka tunnel for national road 9 and for the KyotoJukan expressway was constructed directly under the pass.

== Folklore ==
It was known in popular mythology as the residence of Shuten-dōji, an oni. A kubizuka where the head of Shuten-dōji is supposed to lay is said to exist on the south side of Oino-saka-toge Pass.
