= Saigū =

Saigū or Saigu can refer to:

- Saiō, also known as a saigū
- Saikū, a palace complex established as the residence of the Saiō
- Saigu, an alternative term for the 1992 Los Angeles riots
