= Saiō =

Princess appointed as a shrine maiden

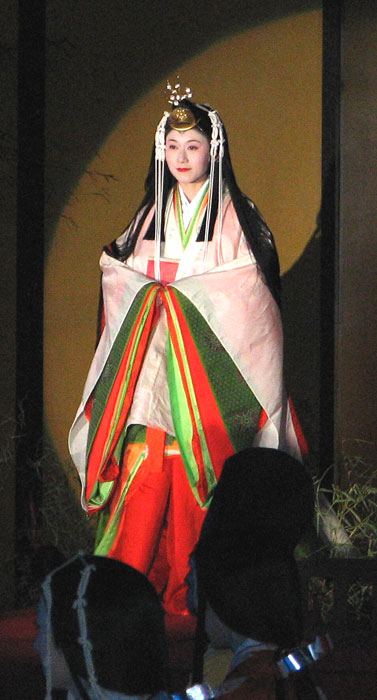
Saiō in jūnihitoe, 2007 Saiō Matsuri

Saiō (斎王) or itsuki no miko was the title of the unmarried female members of the Japanese imperial family, sent to serve at Ise Grand Shrine from the late 7th century to the 14th century. The saiō's residence, Saikū (斎宮), was about 10 km (6.2 mi) north-west of the shrine. The remains of Saikū are situated in the town of Meiwa, Mie Prefecture, Japan.

== Origins ==
Image from the Tale of Genji showing what life at Saikū might have been like

According to Japanese legend, around 2,000 years ago the divine Yamatohime-no-mikoto, daughter of the Emperor Suinin, set out from Mount Miwa in Nara Prefecture in search of a permanent location to worship the goddess Amaterasu-ōmikami. Her search lasted for 20 years and eventually brought her to Ise, Mie Prefecture, where the Ise Shrine now stands. Prior to Yamatohime-no-mikoto's journey, Amaterasu-ōmikami had been worshiped at the Imperial Palaces in Yamato.

According to the Man'yōshū (The Anthology of Ten Thousand Leaves), the first saiō to serve at Ise was Princess Ōku, daughter of Emperor Tenmu, during the Asuka period of Japanese history. Mention of the saiō is also made in the Aoi, Sakaki and Yugao chapters of The Tale of Genji, as well as in the 69th chapter of The Tales of Ise (Ise Monogatari).

In the 13th century, Jien recorded in the Gukanshō that during the reign of Emperor Suinin, the first High Priestess (saiō) was appointed for Ise Shrine. Hayashi Gahō's 17th-century Nihon Ōdai Ichiran is somewhat more expansive, explaining that since Suinin's time, a daughter of the emperor was almost always appointed as high priestess, but across the centuries, there had been times when the emperor himself had no daughter; and in such circumstances, the daughter of a close relative of the emperor would have been appointed to fill the untimely vacancy.

== Role ==
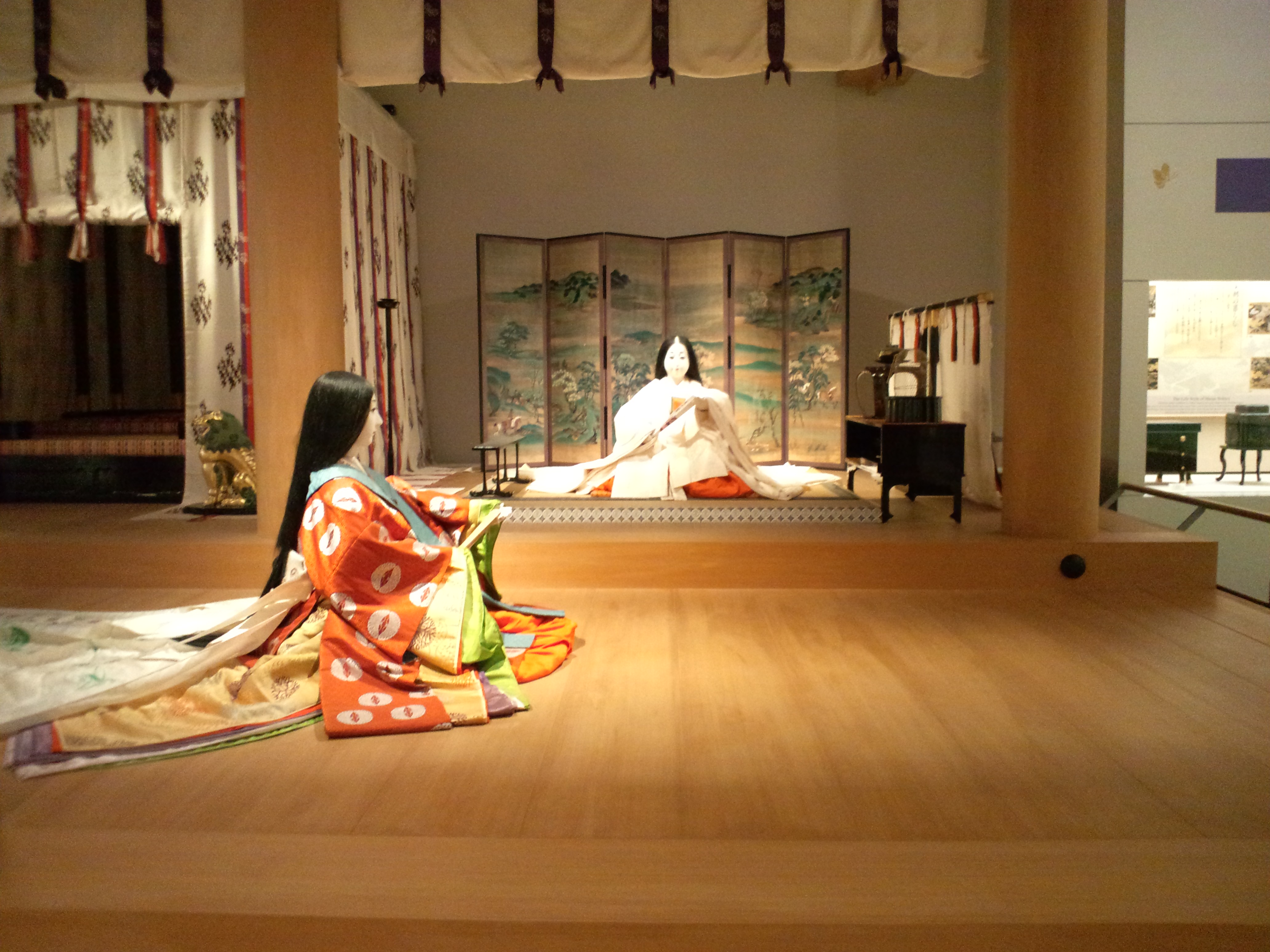
Recreation of the room of the saiō, in the Saikū Historical Museum

The role of the saiō was to serve as High Priestess at Ise Shrine on behalf of the Emperor, to represent the role first set out by Yamatohime-no-mikoto. Three rituals a year were conducted at the Shrine in which the saiō prayed for peace and protection. In June and November each year, she journeyed to the Shrine to perform the Tsukinamisai Festival. In September in the lunisolar calendar, she performed the Kannamesai Festival to make offerings to the kami of the year's new grain harvest.

For the rest of the year, the saiō lived in Saikū, a small town of up to 500 people approximately 10 km (6.2 mi) north-west of Ise, in modern Meiwa, Mie Prefecture. Life at Saikū was, for the most part, peaceful. The saiō would spend her time composing waka verses, collect shells on the shore of Ōyodo beach, or set out in boats and recite poetry upon the water and wait to be recalled to Kyoto.

== Selection process ==
When an Emperor died or abdicated the throne, when the saiō's relative died, or when certain political power required, she would be recalled to the capital and a new saiō selected from one of the new Emperor's unmarried female relatives using divination by either burnt tortoise shell or deer bones. The new saiō would then undergo a period of purification, known as gunkō, before setting out with her retinue of up to 500 people for Saikū, never to return to the capital until recalled by the next Emperor.

Upon the selection of the new saiō, the current saiō and her retinue would return to the capital to resume their lives as part of the Imperial Court. Often, a saiō was quite young when she left the capital for Saikū, and would only be in her mid-teens or early twenties when she returned to the capital. It was considered a great honor to marry a former saiō and her time at Saikū improved her own position at court and those of the people who served with her.

== Procession to Saikū ==
Map of the travel routes to Saikū, the seat of the saiō

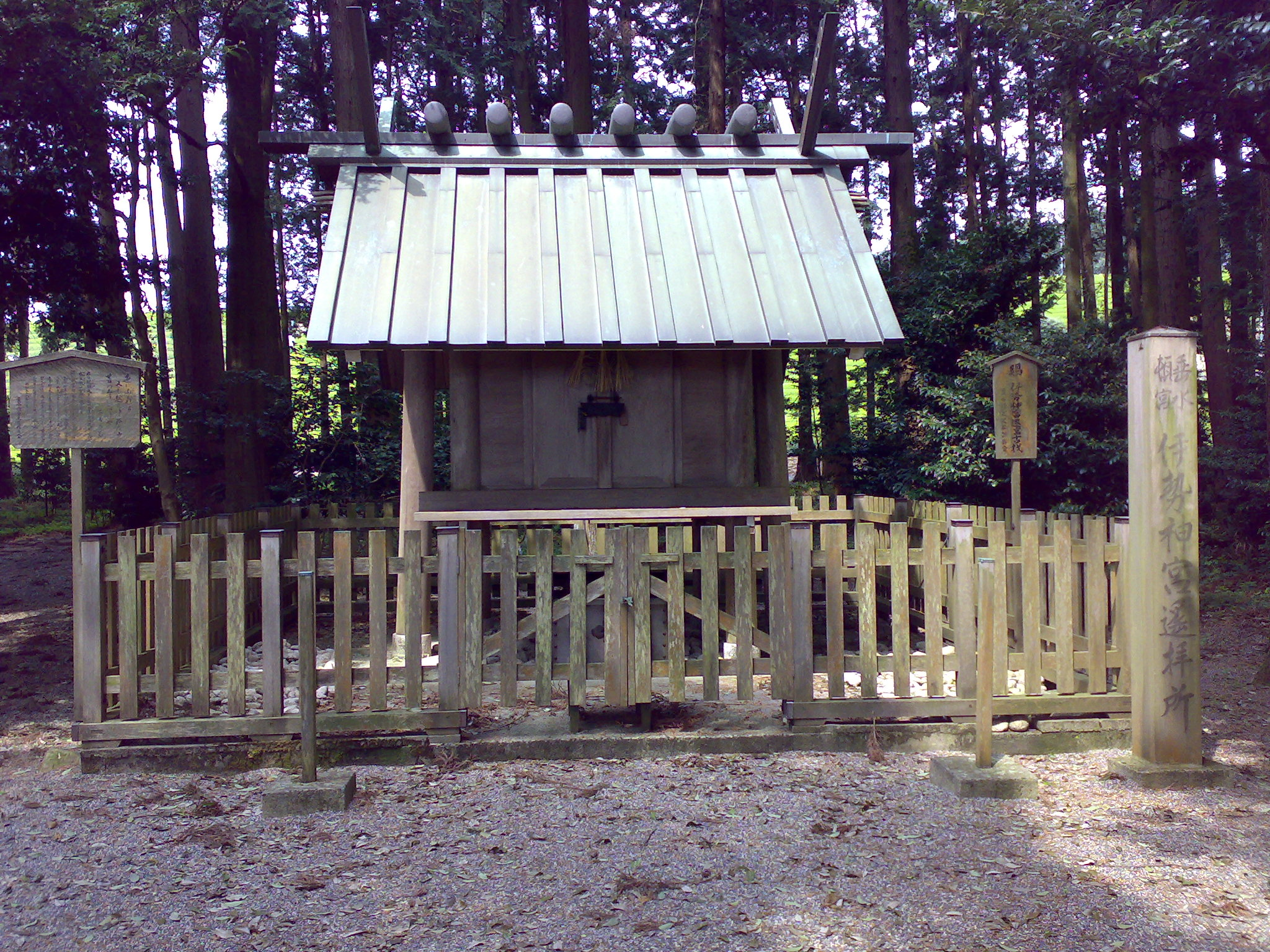
The Tarumi-tongū temporary residence

The procession routes of the saiō changed after the capital was moved to Heian-kyō in 794.

The procession began in what is today the Arashiyama district on the west side of Kyoto. In the Heian period, successive imperial princesses stayed in the Nonomiya Shrine for a year or more to purify themselves before becoming representatives of the imperial family at the Ise Shrine. Contemporary annual processions recreate a scene from a picture scroll of the imperial court during the Heian period, starting from the shrine and continuing as far as the Togetsu-kyo Bridge, Arashiyama.

The procession of the saiō from Kyoto to Saikū, the saiō's official residence in Ise, was the largest procession of its kind in Japan for its time. Up to 500 people would set out from Kyoto as a part of the saiō's retinue for the journey, which lasted six days and five nights. From Kyoto, they travelled in an eastward direction, passing through the Suzuka Pass, which was without doubt the most difficult part of the journey. Once clearing the pass, the retinue would descend into the Ise region and turn south, eventually reaching the Kushida River (櫛田川). Here, the saiō would stop to perform a final cleansing ritual before crossing the river and travelling the short distance to Saikū.

The saiō was expected to remain at Saikū until the emperor whom she represented either died or abdicated the throne. The saiō was permitted to return to Kyoto only on the provision of a close relative's death. When returning to Kyoto, a different route was taken through the mountains to Nara, then to Osaka Bay where a ceremony was to be performed before she could finally return to the capital.

== From Japanese literature ==
=== Princess Ōku ===
The Man'yōshū (The Anthology of Ten Thousand Leaves), tells the story of Princess Ōku, the first saiō to serve at Ise Shrine. The daughter of Emperor Tenmu, Japan's 40th emperor (according to the traditional order of succession), Princess Ōku and her younger brother, Prince Ōtsu, survived the Jinshin incident. After taking up her role as saiō, her brother was put to death for treason in 686 and Princess Ōku was relieved of her duties and returned to Yamato. Here, she enshrined her brother's remains on Mt. Futakami before she died the age of 41.

=== Princess Yoshiko ===
The Tale of Genji tells the story of Rokujo-no-miyasudokoro, which is believed to be based on Princess Yoshiko, who served as saiō from 936 to 945. In The Tale of Genji, Rokujo-no-miyasudokoro became the saiō of Ise Shrine at the young age of 8, serving at the shrine for 9 years. After returning to the capital, she became a consort to Emperor Murakami and gave birth to Princess Noriko. She became famous throughout Kyoto for her colorful life, devoting herself to waka poetry and music. According to the story, she falls in love with Prince Genji, but her jealous nature brings about the death of two of her rivals. When her daughter is chosen as saiō at the age of 13, Rokujo-no-miyasudokoro decides to join her in Saikū to help her overcome her feelings for Genji.

=== Princess Yasuko ===
The love story of Ariwara-no-Narihira and the 31st saiō, Princess Yasuko (served as saiō from 859 to 876), is told in the 69th chapter of The Tales of Ise. Ariwara-no-Narihira, well known in his time for his good looks, is married to Princess Yasuko's cousin, but on meeting at the Saikū, they fall into forbidden love. Giving in to temptation, they secretly meet under a pine tree on the shore of Ōyodo Port to reveal their feelings for one another and to promise to meet again the following night. But this first secret meeting would also be the last, as Narihira was due to depart that next day for Owari Province. Princess Yasuko came to see Narihira off, and they were never to see each other again, though it is said that Princess Yasuko bore a child as a result of the brief love affair.

== End of the saiō system ==
It is not precisely clear when the saiō system ended, but what is known is that it occurred during the turmoil of the Nanboku-chō period when two rival Imperial courts were in existence, in Kyoto and Yoshino. The saiō system had been in steady decline up to this period, with Saikū reverting to just another rural rice farming village after the system's collapse.

Though the area of Saikū remained, it was unclear exactly where the old Imperial town stood until pottery remains were unearthed in 1970 during the construction of housing in the Saikū area, Meiwa Town. A modern museum was built on the site of the first finds and archaeological excavations are continuing, held each summer with the aid of volunteer school children from all over Japan. Though a site for the main saiō residence has been discovered, a large percentage of it lies beneath the main Kintetsu Ise railway line and is inaccessible. Itsukinomiya Historical Experience Hall, a reconstruction of the building using traditional techniques, was built in the 1990s and stands beside Saikū station on the local Kintetsu rail line, no more than 200 metres (660 ft) from the original site.

== Festivals ==
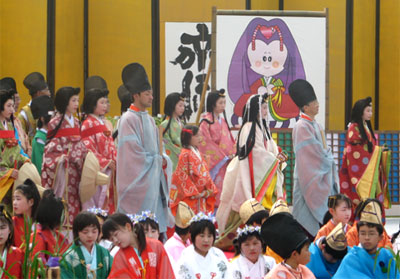
The 2007 Saiō Matsuri in Meiwa, Mie Prefecture

The Aoi Matsuri, the first of the three main festivals held in Kyoto each year, re-enacts the Heian period march of the saiō to the Shimigamo Shrine (lower Kamo Shrine) in Sakyo Ward. This festival is held every year on May 15 and in 2006 consisted of 511 people dressed in traditional Heian court clothing and 40 cows and horses, stretching around 800 m (2,600 ft) from start to finish. This festival is said to have started in the 6th century when the Emperor sent his representatives to Shimogamo and Kamigamo Shines to pray from good harvests.

The Saiō Matsuri is held in the town of Meiwa, Mie Prefecture, on the first weekend of June each year. First held in 1983, it re-enacts the march of the saiō from her residence at Saikū, to the nearby Ise Shrine. More than 100 people dressed in traditional Heian-period dress along a section of the old Ise kaido (pilgrimage road), before ending in the grounds of the Saikū Museum.

== List of saiō ==
=== Pre Saikū ===
Before the establishment of the Saikū by Emperor Tenmu, the saiō were as follows

Saiō
Date	Saiō	Japanese name	Birth / Death year	Appointed by	Relationship to the Emperor	Notes
?	Toyosukiirihime	豊鍬入姫命	?	Emperor Sujin	Daughter	She worshipped at the shrine of Ise, but is generally not considered the first official Saiō
?	Yamatohime-no-mikoto	倭姫命	?	Emperor Suinin	Daughter	First official Saiō
?	Princess Iyono	五百野皇女	?	Emperor Keikō	Daughter	
?	Princess Iwashi	伊和志真皇女	?	Emperor Chūai	Daughter	
456?-459?	Princess Wakatarashihime	稚足姫 皇女	?-459?	Emperor Yūryaku	Daughter	She is said to have committed suicide three years after becoming Saiō. She is estimated to have died in 459, hence the estimation that she became Saiō in 456.
507?-?	Princess Sasage	荳角皇女	?	Emperor Keitai	Daughter	
?	Princess Iwakuma	磐隈皇女	?	Emperor Kinmei	Daughter	Dismissed after committing adultery.
578	Princess Uji	菟道皇女	?	Emperor Bidatsu	Daughter	Dismissed after one year after being raped by Prince Ikebe (possibly Emperor Yōmei)
586-622	Princess Sukatehime	酢香手姫皇女	?	Emperor Yōmei	Daughter	Tenureship spanned the reigns of Emperor Yōmei, Emperor Sushun, and Empress Suiko

=== Post saikū ===
After the establishment of the Saikū system by Emperor Tenmu, these were priestesses of Ise Shrine.

List of saiō who served at Saikū

Saiō
Date	Saiō	Japanese name	Birth / Death year	Appointed by	Relationship to the Emperor
673–686	Princess Ōku	大来皇女	661–701	Emperor Tenmu	Daughter
698–701	Princess Taki	多紀皇女	?–751	Emperor Monmu	Aunt
701–706?	Princess Izumi	泉内親王	?–734	Emperor Monmu	Distant relative
706–707?	Princess Takata	田形内親王	?–728	Emperor Monmu	Aunt
715?–721	Princess Kuse	久勢女王		Empress Genshō	Unknown
721–730?	Princess Inoe	井上内親王	717–775	Emperor Shōmu	Daughter
744?–749	Princess Agata	県女王		Emperor Shōmu	Unknown
749–756?	Princess Oyake	小宅女王		Empress Kōken	Distant relative
758–764?	Princess Yamao	山於女王		Emperor Junnin	Unknown
772–775?	Princess Sakahito	酒人内親王	754–829	Emperor Kōnin	Daughter
775?–781?	Princess Kiyoniwa	浄庭女王		Emperor Kōnin	Distant relative
782–796	Princess Asahara	朝原内親王	779–817	Emperor Kanmu	Daughter
796–806	Princess Fuse	布勢内親王	?–812	Emperor Kanmu	Daughter
806–809	Princess Ōhara	大原内親王	?–863	Emperor Heizei	Daughter
809–823	Princess Yoshiko	仁子内親王	?–889	Emperor Saga	Daughter
823–827	Princess Ujiko	氏子内親王	?–885	Emperor Junna	Daughter
828–833	Princess Yoshiko	宜子女王		Emperor Junna	Niece
833–850	Princess Hisako	久子内親王	?–876	Emperor Ninmyō	Daughter
850–858	Princess Yasuko	晏子内親王	?–900	Emperor Montoku	Daughter
859–876	Princess Yasuko	恬子内親王	?–913	Emperor Seiwa	Sister (different mother)
877–880	Princess Satoko	識子内親王	874–906	Emperor Yōzei	Sister (different mother)
882–884	Princess Nagako	掲子内親王	?–914	Emperor Yōzei	Aunt
884–887	Princess Shigeko	繁子内親王	?–916	Emperor Kōkō	Daughter
889–897	Princess Motoko	元子女王		Emperor Uda	Distant relative
897–930	Princess Yasuko	柔子内親王	?–959	Emperor Daigo	Sister (same mother)
931–936	Princess Masako	雅子内親王	909–954	Emperor Suzaku	Sister (different mother)
936	Princess Sayoko	斉子内親王	921–936	Emperor Suzaku	Sister (different mother)
936–945	Princess Kishi	徽子女王	929–985	Emperor Suzaku	Niece
946	Princess Hanako	英子内親王	921–946	Emperor Murakami	Sister (different mother)
947–954	Princess Yoshiko	悦子女王		Emperor Murakami	Niece
955–967	Princess Rakushi	楽子内親王	952–998	Emperor Murakami	Daughter
968–969	Princess Sukeko	輔子内親王	953–992	Emperor Murakami	Daughter
969–974	Princess Takako	隆子女王	?–974	Prince Akiakira	Daughter
975–984	Princess Noriko	規子内親王	949–986	Emperor Murakami	Daughter
984–986	Princess Saishi	済子女王		Prince Akiakira	Daughter
986–1010	Princess Kyōshi	恭子女王	984–?	Prince Tamehira	Daughter
1012–1016	Princess Masako	当子内親王	1001–1023	Emperor Sanjō	Daughter
1016–1036	Princess Senshi	嫥子女王	1005–1074	Prince Tomohira	Daughter
1036–1045	Princess Nagako	良子内親王	1029–1077	Emperor Go-Suzaku	Daughter
1046–1051	Princess Yoshiko	嘉子内親王	c. 1030–?	Emperor Go-Reizei	
1051–1068	Princess Tagako	敬子女王		Emperor Go-Reizei	
1069–1072	Princess Toshiko	俊子内親王	1056–1132	Emperor Go-Sanjō	
1073–1077	Princess Atsuko	淳子女王		Emperor Shirakawa	
1078–1084	Princess Yasuko	媞子内親王	1076–1096	Emperor Shirakawa	
1087–1107	Princess Yoshiko	善子内親王	1077–1132	Emperor Horikawa	
1108–1123	Princess Aiko	恂子内親王	1093–1132	Emperor Toba	
1123–1141	Princess Moriko	守子女王	1111–1156	Emperor Sutoku	
1142–1150	Princess Yoshiko	妍子内親王	?–1161	Emperor Konoe	
1151–1155	Princess Yoshiko	喜子内親王		Emperor Konoe	
1156–1158	Princess Asako	亮子内親王	1147–1216	Emperor Go-Shirakawa	
1158–1165	Princess Yoshiko	好子内親王	1148–1192	Emperor Nijō	
1165–1168	Princess Nobuko	休子内親王	1157–1171	Emperor Rokujō	
1168–1172	Princess Atsuko	惇子内親王	1158–1172	Emperor Takakura	
1177–1179	Princess Isako	功子内親王	1176–?	Emperor Takakura	
1185–1198	Princess Sayoko	潔子内親王	1179–after 1227	Emperor Go-Toba	
1199–1210	Princess Sumiko	粛子内親王	1196–?	Emperor Tsuchimikado	
1215–1221	Princess Hiroko	熙子内親王	1205–?	Emperor Juntoku	
1226–1232	Princess Toshiko	利子内親王	1197–1251	Emperor Go-Horikawa	
1237–1242	Princess Teruko	昱子内親王	1231–1246	Emperor Shijō	
1244–1246	Princess Akiko	曦子内親王	1224–1262	Emperor Go-Saga	
1262–1272	Princess Yasuko	愷子内親王	1249–1284	Emperor Kameyama	
1306–1308	Princess Masako	弉子内親王	1286–1348	Emperor Go-Nijō	
1330–1331	Princess Yoshiko	懽子内親王	1315–1362	Emperor Go-Daigo	
1333–1334	Princess Sachiko	祥子内親王		Emperor Go-Daigo	
