= Aoi Matsuri =

Traditional Japanese Festival in Kyoto

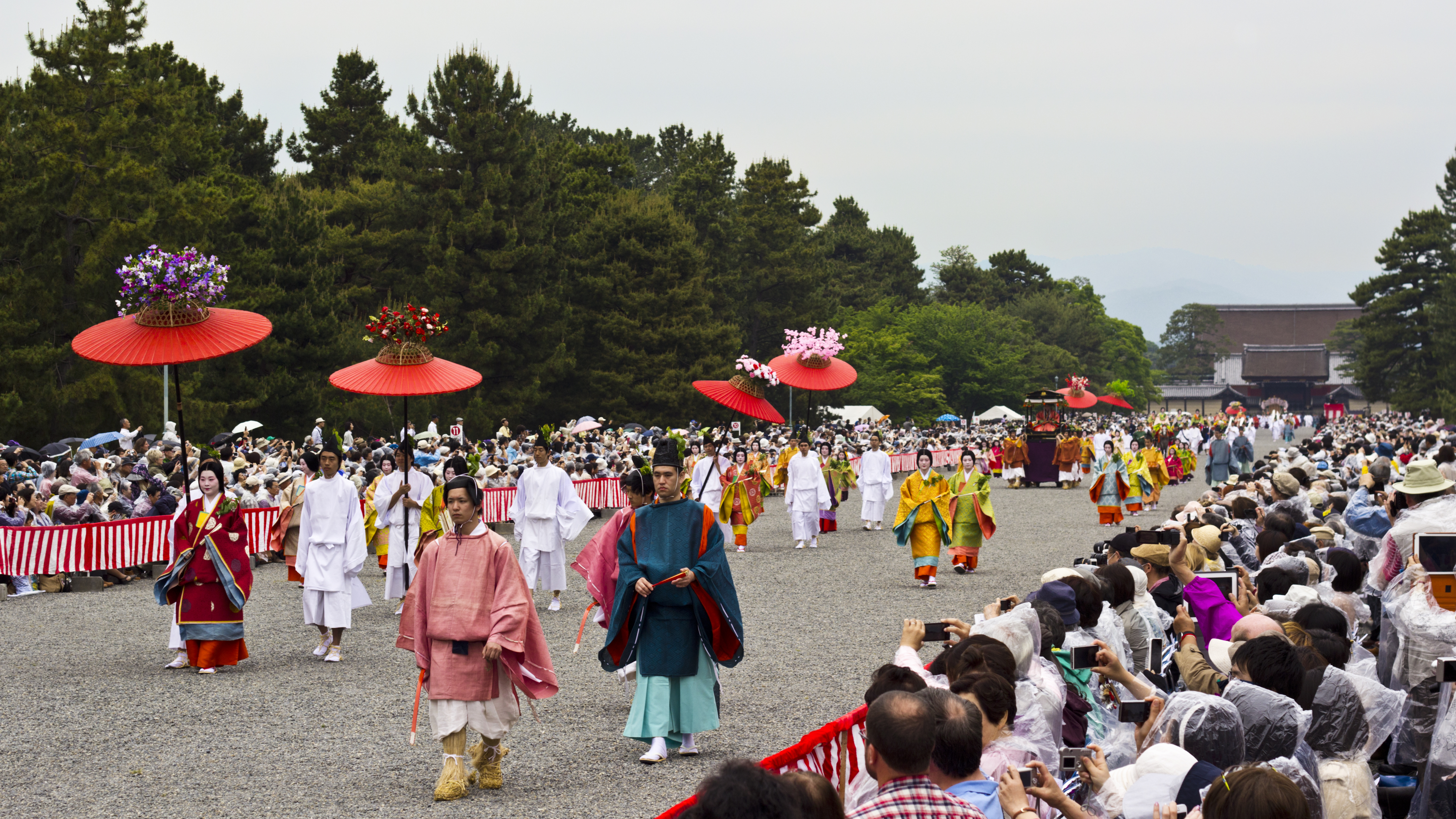
The Aoi Matsuri procession, departing in front of Kyoto Imperial Palace's main gate Kenreimon (建礼門)

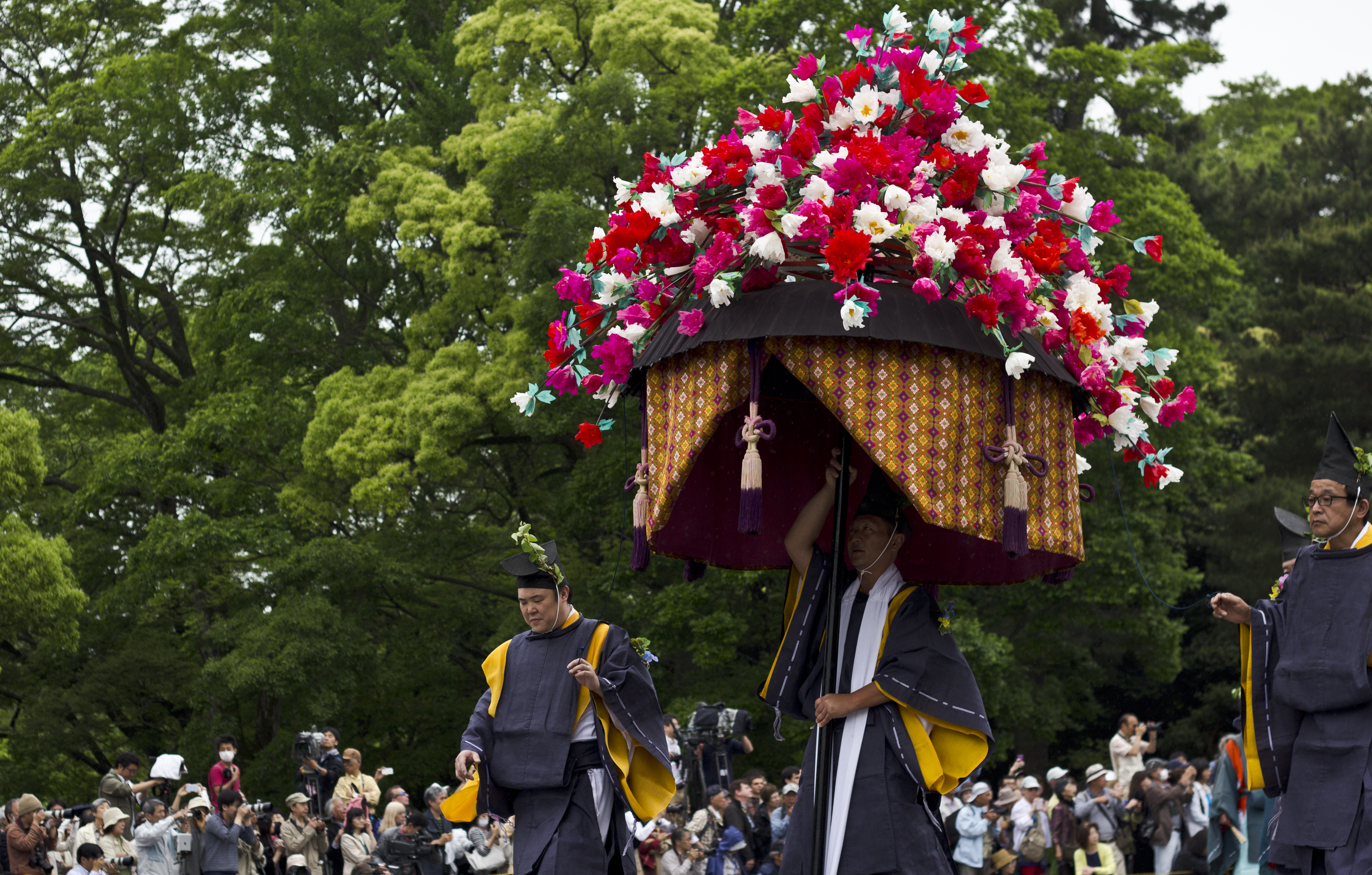
Man carrying a hollyhock float

The Aoi Matsuri (葵祭), or "Hollyhock Festival", (although commonly, but mistakenly identified as "hollyhock", the "aoi" actually belongs to the birthwort family and translates as "wild ginger"—Asarum) is one of the three main annual festivals held in Kyoto, Japan, the other two being the Festival of the Ages (Jidai Matsuri) and the Gion Festival. It is a festival of the two Kamo shrines in the north of the city, Shimogamo Shrine and Kamigamo Shrine. The festival may also be referred to as the Kamo Festival. It is held on 15 May of each year.

== History ==
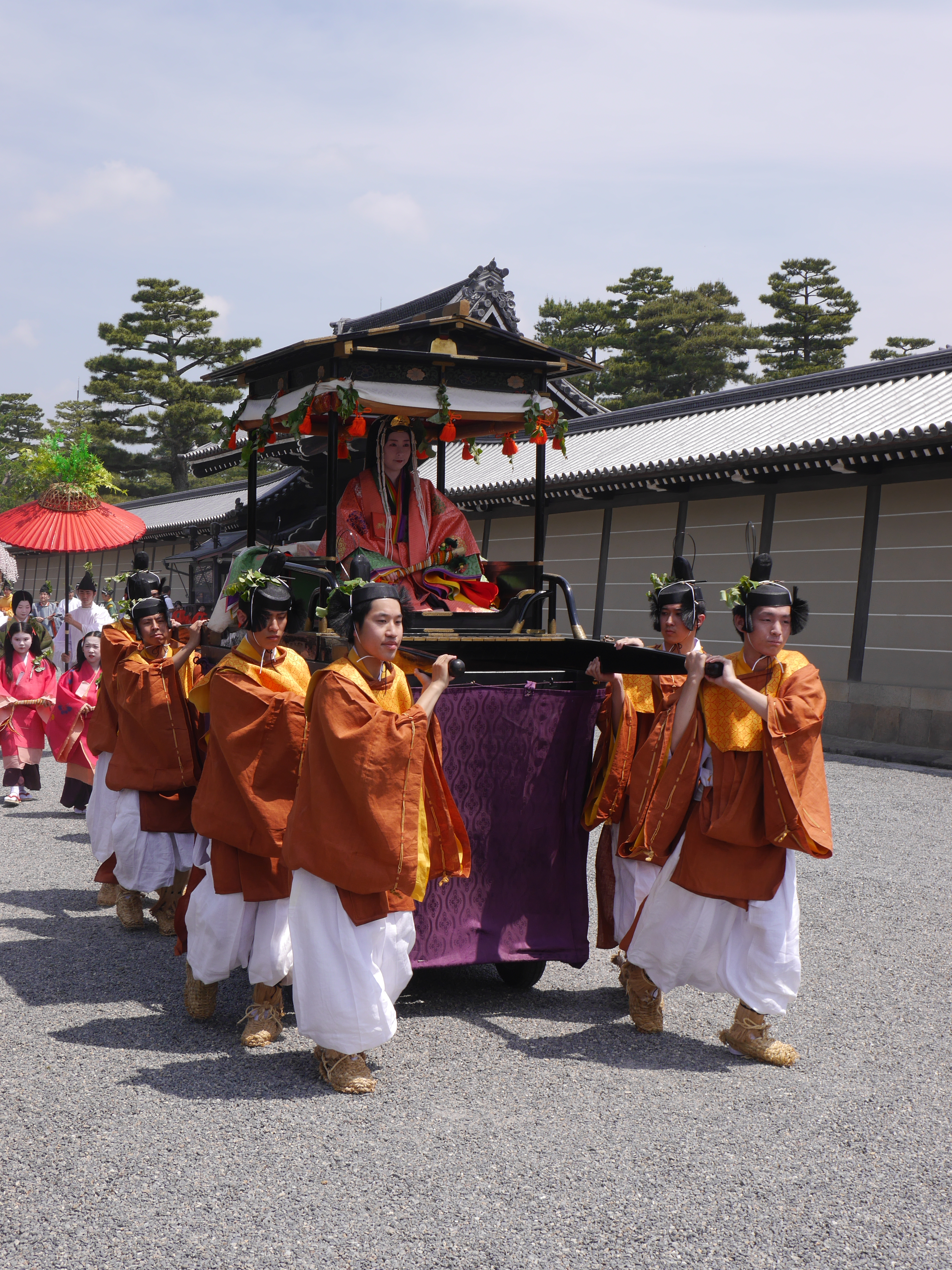
The Saiō-Dai carried in her palanquin

According to the Nihon Shoki, the festival originated during the reign of Emperor Kinmei (reigned CE 539 - 571). The ancient records known as the Honchō getsurei (本朝月令) and Nenchūgyōji hissho (年中行事秘抄) reveal that a succession of disastrous rains with high winds ruined the grain crops, and epidemics had spread through the country. Because diviners placed the cause on divine punishment by the Kamo deities, the Emperor sent his messenger with a retinue to the shrine to conduct various acts to appease the deities, in prayer for a bountiful harvest. These included riding a galloping horse.

This became an annual ritual, and the galloping horse performance developed into an equestrian archery performance. According to the historical record known as the Shoku Nihongi (続日本記), so many people had come to view this equestrian performance on the festival day in the 2nd year of the reign of Emperor Monmu (r. 697–707) that the event was banned.

In the ninth century, Emperor Kanmu established the seat of the imperial throne in Kyoto. This represented the beginning of the Heian period in Japanese history. Emperor Kanmu recognized the deities of the Kamo shrines as protectors of the Heian capital, and established the Aoi Matsuri as an annual imperial event.

The festival saw its peak of grandeur in the middle of the Heian period, but this waned in the Kamakura period and the following Muromachi period, and as the nation entered the Sengoku period, the festival procession was discontinued. In the Genroku era (1688–1704) of the Edo period, it was revived, but in the 2nd year of the Meiji period (1869), when the capital was moved from Kyoto to Tokyo, observance of the festival procession stopped. In Meiji-17 (1885), it was again revived as part of a government plan to enliven Kyoto. All but the rituals at the shrine fronts were discontinued from 1944, due to the Pacific War. At last, the festival procession started to be held again from 1953. The Saiō-Dai festival princess tradition was initiated in 1956. The Saiō (斎王) was an unmarried female member of the Japanese imperial house.

The festival is named after the hollyhock (aoi) leaves used as decoration throughout the celebration as well as offerings to the gods. During the Heian Period, these leaves were once believed to protect against natural disasters such as earthquakes and thunder, and were often hung under the roofs of homes for protection. However, the plants used in the Aoi Matsuri may not be hollyhock, but possibly wild ginger. Due to the rarity of these plants, other plants with similarly shaped leaves have been used in the festival instead, such as the leaves of the katsura tree.

== Festival events ==
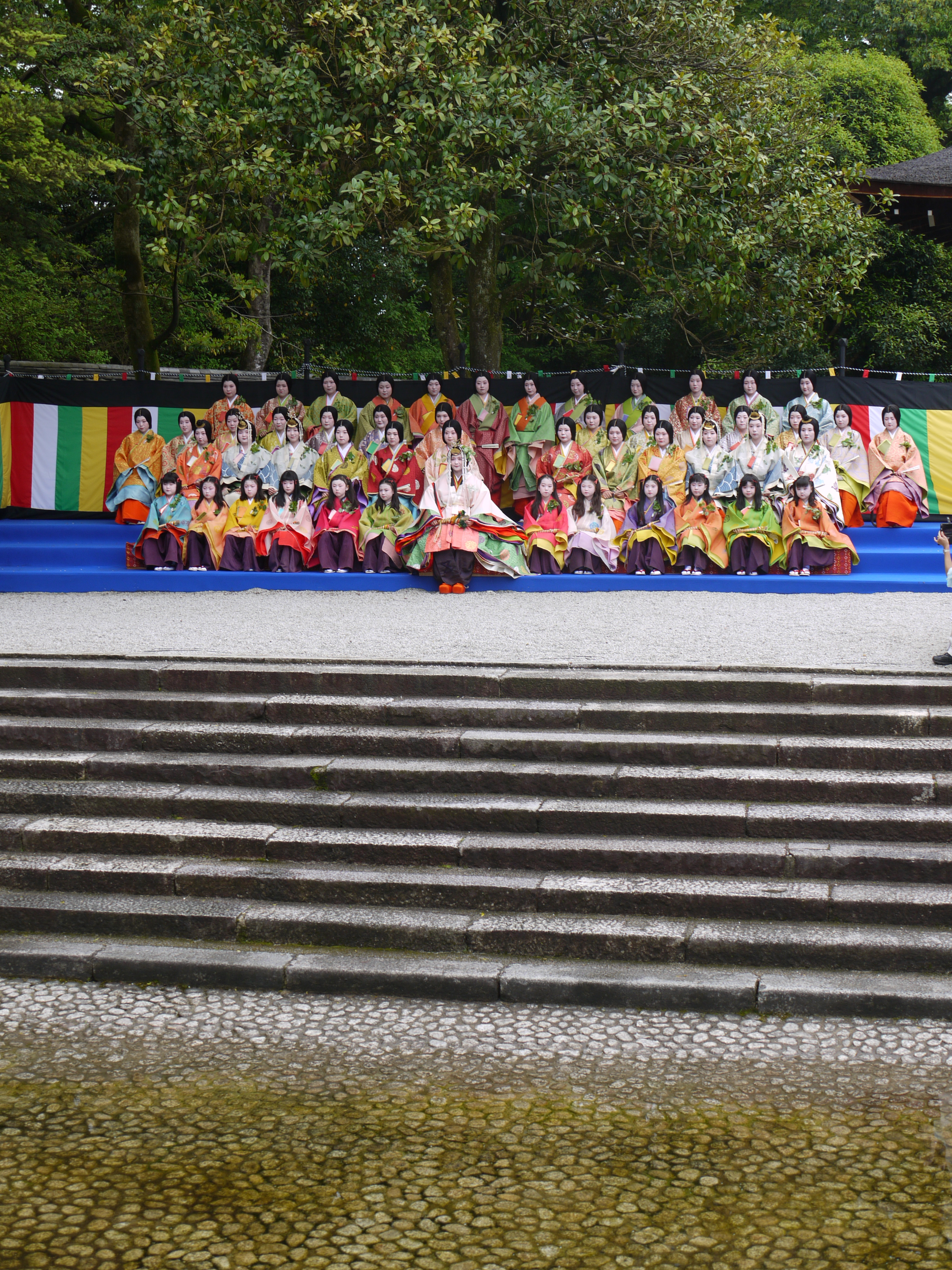
The Saiō-Dai and her retinue

Preceding the main procession, a rite of divine manifestation known as Miare shinji is held on the night of 12 May at Kamigamo Shrine, in which the deity is invoked into five sakaki trees erected within a himorogi. On 15 May, the kami's manifestation is welcomed at Shimogamo Shrine through a procession of sacred horses (shinme) traveling from Mount Mikage, in a rite known as Mikage matsuri, before being carried to the shrine.There are several events that take place during the month but the most important event is on 15 May.

There are two parts to Aoi Matsuri: the procession (rotō-no-gi) and the shrine rites. The procession is led by the Imperial Messenger. Following the imperial messenger are: two oxcarts, four cows, thirty-six horses, and six hundred people. The six hundred people are all wearing traditional dress of Heian nobles (ōmiyabito), while the oxcart (gissha) is adorned with artificial wisteria flowers. The procession starts at 10:30 on May 15 and leaves the Kyoto Imperial Palace in front of the main gate Kenreimon (建礼門) and slowly works its way towards the Shimogamo Shrine and finally the Kamigamo Shrine. When they finally arrive at both shrines, the Saiō-Dai and Imperial Messenger perform their rituals. The Saiō-Dai simply pays her respects to the deities and the Imperial Messenger intones the imperial rescript praising the deities and requesting their continued favor.

There are two main figures in the Aoi Matsuri: the Saiō-Dai and the Imperial Messenger. Historically the Saiō-Dai was a woman of the imperial house who was chosen from the sisters and daughters of the emperor to dedicate herself to the Shimogamo shrine. The role of Saiō-Dai was to maintain ritual purity and to represent the emperor at the festival. Nowadays, the role of the Saiō-Dai is a stand-in by an unmarried woman in Kyoto. She has to have the three attributes of wisdom, grace, and social standing. The selection process is strict and the news is announced in the press. It is the highest honour a woman can receive in Kyoto. The Saiō-Dai is dressed in the traditional style of the Heian court. Traditional Heian court dress for women would be wearing several layers of exquisitely colored silk robes. The Saiō-Dai wears twelve layers of the traditional style robes (jūnihitoe). To maintain ritual purity, the Saiō-Dai goes through several ceremonies of purification before the procession of the festival. The Imperial Messenger leads the festival procession on horseback. During the Heian period he would be a Fifth-Rank courtier holding the office of middle or lesser captain and was usually a man destined for high office. His role was to read the imperial rescript of the shrines and present the emperor’s offerings. During the Heian period, the Saiō-Dai and the Imperial messenger would be accompanied by ten dancers and twelve musicians. Also present during the procession are guards (kebiishii), government officials, civic officials, military retainers, and a delegate from Yamashiro (Yamashiro-no-Tsukai).

Also featured at the Aoi Matsuri are horse races (kurabe-uma), and demonstrations of mounted archery (yabusame).

Many things in Kyoto are named after the Aoi.

== See also ==
- Saiō Matsuri in Ise, which is the traditional procession of the Saiō to Ise Shrine

== Works cited ==
- Aoi Matsuri (2004). Retrieved from website on 20 Jan 2009
- Aoi Matsuri. (2009). Retrieved from website on 20 Jan 2009
- Aoi Matsuri Festival. (2007). Retrieved from website on 20 Jan 2009
- Aoi Matsuri (Hollyhock Festival). (2009). Retrieved from website on 20 January 2009
- Frang, M. (2002). Rites of Heritage. World & I. V.17(5): 176. Retrieved from MAS Ultra – School Edition database on 21 January 2009.
- Layered Look, The. (1995) Civilization. Mar/Apr. V.2(2): 22. Retrieved from Academic Search Premiere database on 20 January 2009.
- Shimogamo Jinja. (2009). Retrieved from website on 21 Jan 2009
- Shively, D., Hall, J., McCullough, W. (1999). The Cambridge History of Japan. Retrieved from Google Book Search on 20 Jan 2009
