= Jūnihitoe =

Japanese women's court dress

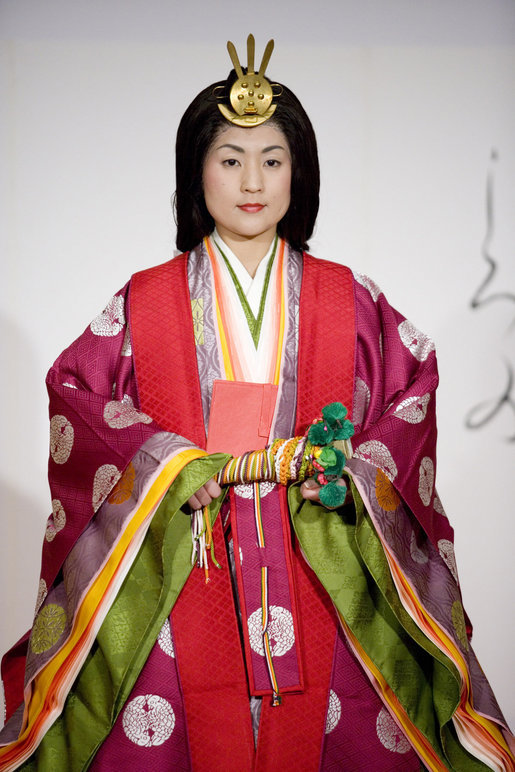
A young woman modelling a jūnihitoe

The jūnihitoe (十二単, lit. 'twelve layers'), more formally known as the itsutsuginu-karaginu-mo (五衣唐衣裳), is a style of formal court dress first worn in the Heian period by noble women and ladies-in-waiting at the Japanese Imperial Court. The jūnihitoe was composed of a number of kimono-like robes, layered on top of each other, with the outer robes cut both larger and thinner to reveal the layered garments underneath. These robes were referred to as hitoe, with the innermost robe – worn as underwear against the skin – known as the kosode. Hakama were also worn as underwear with the kosode; over time, the two would gradually become outerwear, with the kosode eventually developing into the modern-day kimono.

Despite the name, the jūnihitoe varied in its exact number of layers. It also featured an obi (belt), though unlike modern version, this was little more than a thin, cordlike length of fabric. The number of layers, and the type of layers, could alter the formality of a jūnihitoe outfit, with some accessories, such as overcoats and a long, skirt-like train (known as the mō) only worn for special, formal occasions.

Heian-period court clothing paid special attention to colour symbolism, with the layered colour combinations of women's clothing known as kasane no irome (襲の色目). These colour combinations, referred to by names that reflected their corresponding season of wear, did not faithfully reproduce the exact colours of nature, but were instead intended to reproduce a feeling of the season.

The jūnihitoe first appeared some time around the 10th century; however, by the Kamakura period, the number of layers worn by aristocratic ladies, even in court, had been reduced heavily. In the present day, the jūnihitoe is still worn by members of the Imperial House of Japan on important occasions.

== Components, colours, and accessories ==
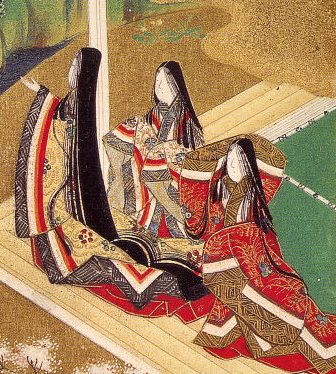
Court ladies wearing the jūnihitoe, image from the Genji monogatari

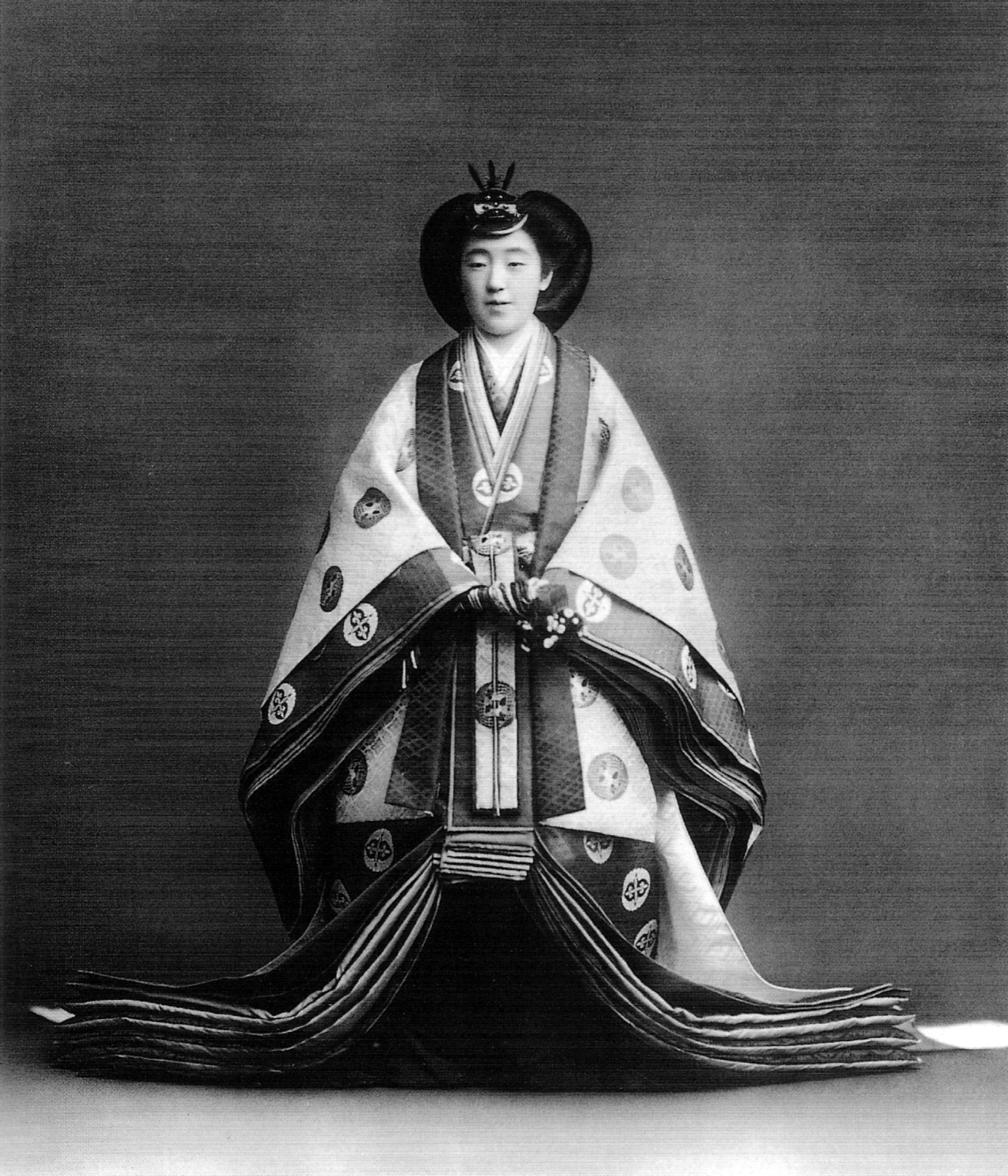
Empress Kōjun wearing a jūnihitoe for her enthronement in 1928

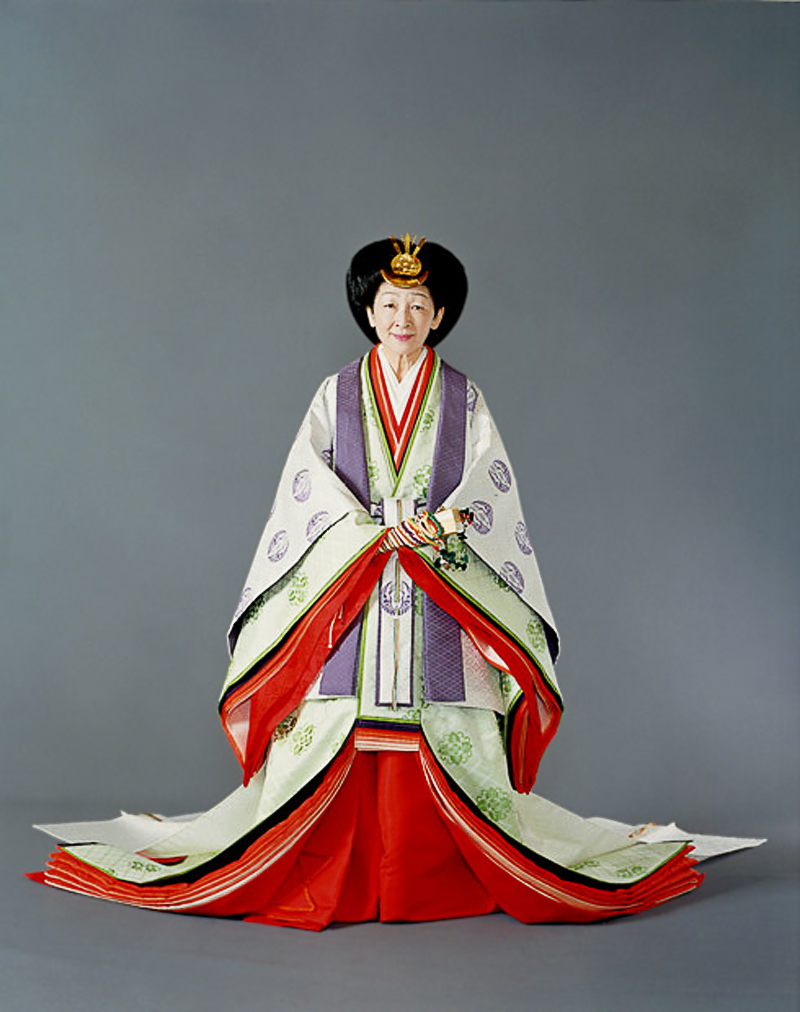
Empress Michiko wearing the jūnihitoe at the enthronement ceremony in November 1990

=== Jūnihitoe layers ===
The term jūnihitoe is the common, retroactively-applied name used for women's layered court clothing in Heian period Japan, rather than acting as the formal name for the set of clothes and accessories worn together. Each layer consisted of silk garments, with the innermost garment (the kosode) being made of plain white silk, followed by other layers in different colours and silk fabrics. The outfit could be finished with the addition of a final layer or, for formal occasions, a coat and train.

In the earlier styles of the jūnihitoe, a greater number of layers were worn, the total weight of which could total as much as 20 kilograms (44 lb). Due to this weight, movement could be difficult. Heian ladies commonly slept in the innermost layers of their jūnihitoe, the hakama and kosode, using them as a form of pajamas. Layers could be shed or kept, depending on the season and the nighttime temperatures. By the Muromachi period, however, the number of layers of the dress had reduced considerably.

The layers of the jūnihitoe were referred to with separate names. Hitoe (lit. 'unlined robe') referred to each individual robe layered on top of the kosode, excluding the coat and train layers. Itsutsuginu (五衣) referred to the series of layered robes as a set—typically five differently-coloured layers. The short coat worn on top of the itsutsuginu was known as the karaginu (唐衣), and the long, skirt-like train worn for formal occasions was known as the mō (裳). The last three terms can be combined to give the name for the formal set of jūnihitoe clothing: itsutsuginu-karaginu-mo, a term used since the 19th century.

The layers of the jūnihitoe consist of:

- The undergarments, not considered part of the jūnihitoe proper, are typically a two-piece cotton or silk garment.
- The kosode: a short red or white silk robe of ankle or lower calf length.
- The nagabakama: the formal version of hakama worn by noble women; a very long pleated red skirt, sewn with two split legs.
- The hitoe: an unlined silk robe; usually red, white, or blue-green, although other colors (such as dark red-violet or dark green) very rarely occur.
- The itsutsuginu: a series of brightly coloured robes or uchigi, usually five or sometimes six in number, creating the jūnihitoe's layered appearance. Many more layers of uchigi were worn during the Heian period until the government enacted sumptuary laws, reducing the number of layers worn.
- The uchiginu: a scarlet beaten silk robe worn as a stiffener and support for the outer robes.
- The uwagi: a patterned and decorated silk robe, typically with woven decoration, both shorter and narrower than the uchiginu. The colour and fabric used for the uwagi indicate the rank of the wearer.
- The karaginu: a waist-length Chinese style jacket.
- The mo: an apron-like train skirt, worn trailing down the back of the robe. White with dyed or embroidered adornment.

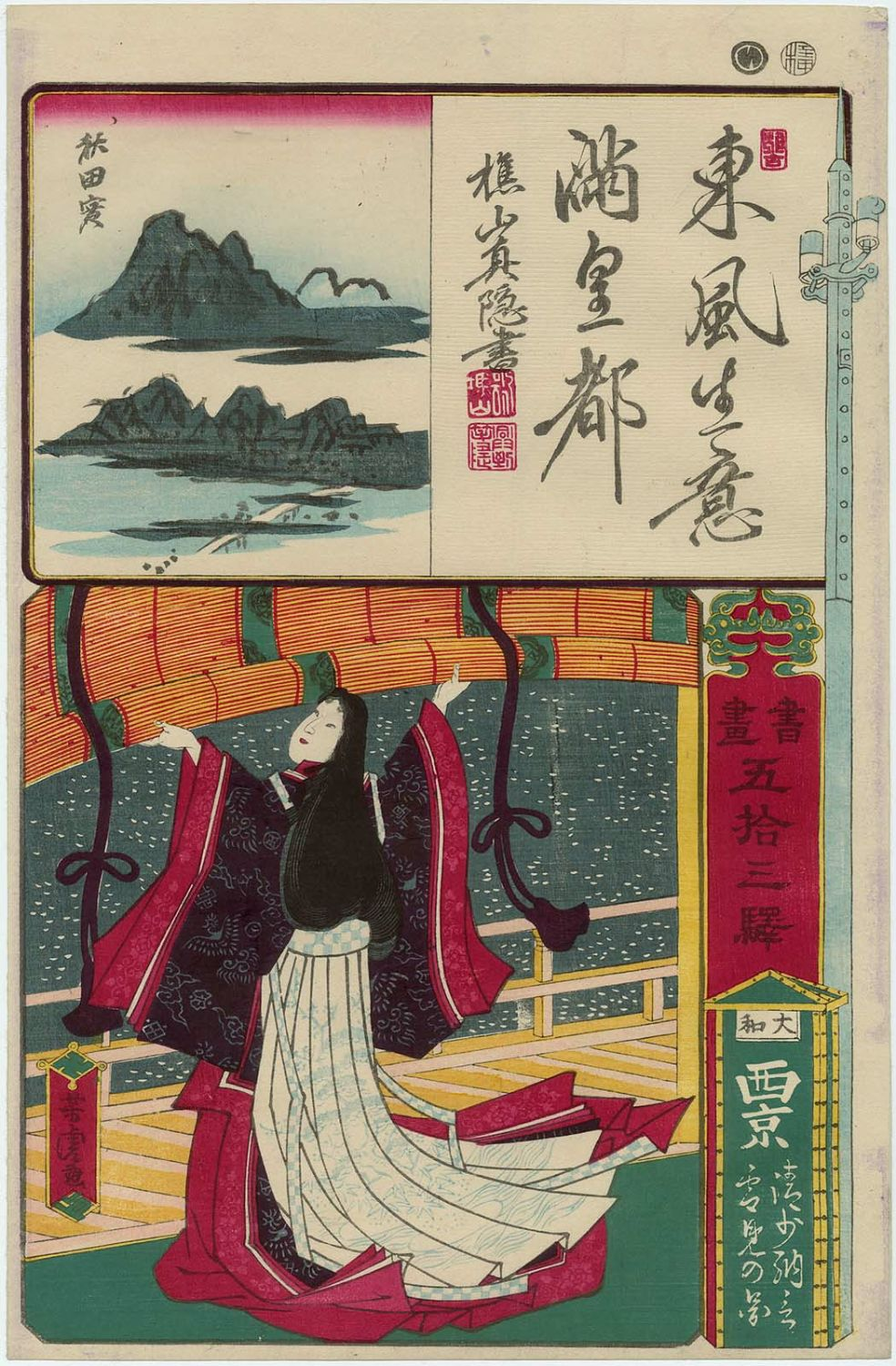
A mo (train) in a 1872 portrait of Sei Shonagon

On less formal occasions, kouchigi (lit. 'small cloak', a shorter brocade robe) were worn over the uchigi or uwagi, intended to raise the formality of an outfit on occasions where the karaginu and mo were not worn. However, karaginu and mo were necessary for the jūnihitoe to be considered the formal attire.

=== Colours and layered colours ===
The colours and their layering held particular significance for the jūnihitoe. The only place where the layers were truly discernable was around the sleeves, the hems of the garment, and the neck, though in summer, sheer fabrics were worn to create new colour effects through the layers. During the Heian period, a woman sat hidden behind a sudare screen with only the lower part of the body and sleeve edges visible to an outsider. Therefore, the layers of colours were used to represent the woman herself, and the arrangements of the layers and their colours were a good indication to an outsider what taste and what rank the lady had.

The colour combinations, termed kasane no irome (襲の色目, "layers of colours"), were given poetic names referring to the flora and fauna of the season, such as "crimson plum of the spring", though they did not necessarily reproduce these colours exactly; a set named "under the snow" had layer of green representing leaves, layers of pink, with white on top to represent snow. The colour combinations changed with the seasons and occasions, with it being fashionable to change one's gowns just before the turn of the season. The appropriate use of these colours, and the point at which one changed one's robes, gave an indication of the cultured and refined taste of the wearer.

Apart from their robes, Japanese court ladies of the Heian era also wore their hair very long, only cut at the sides of their faces in a layered fashion, with the longer hair sometimes worn tied back. This hairstyle was known as suberakashi (垂髪), and was sometimes worn with an ornament on the forehead.

=== Accessories ===
An important accessory worn with the jūnihitoe was an elaborate fan, known as a hiōgi, made out of slats of cypress wood, commonly painted and tied together with long silk cords. This was used by women not only to cool down, but also as an important communication device; since women at the Heian period court were not allowed to speak face-to-face to male outsiders, a woman could hold her sleeve up or use her opened fan to shield herself from inquiring looks.

Communication with potential suitors was generally conducted with women sat behind a sudare blind, with the suitor only able to see the sleeves – and thus the layers – of her jūnihitoe. This practice was prominent during the Heian period, and was described in the Tale of Genji.

== Contemporary use ==
Today, the jūnihitoe can normally only be seen in museums, movies, costume demonstrations, tourist attractions or at certain festivals. Only the Imperial Household of Japan still officially uses them at some important functions, usually the coronation of the Emperor and Empress, with men wearing a sokutai for these occasions.

During the wedding of Empress Masako to the crown prince, the Empress wore jūnihitoe for the official ceremony. The jūnihitoe was also worn by Empress Michiko during the enthronement ceremony of Emperor Akihito in 1990. Though the Empress, the imperial princesses, and their ladies-in-waiting all wore the jūnihitoe, the style worn was a modified form from the Edo period, not the Heian style. For the 2019 enthronement of Emperor Naruhito, the women of the Imperial family and their ladies-in-waiting all wore jūnihitoe, while the Emperor, Crown Prince Akishino, and their gentlemen-in-waiting all wore sokutai.

The Saiō Matsuri held every year in Meiwa, Mie showcases Heian period dress. They are also featured at the Aoi Matsuri in Kyoto.
