= Saiō Matsuri =

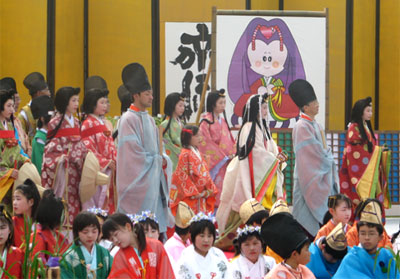
- Scene from 2007 Saiō Matsuri, Meiwa Town, Mie Prefecture, Japan
- Observed by: Meiwa, Mie Prefecture, Japan
- Type: Cultural
- Significance: Celebrates the town's history of once being an Imperial residence
- Begins: Saturday
- Ends: Sunday
- Date: First Saturday in June
- 2025 date: June 7
- 2026 date: June 6
- 2027 date: June 5
- 2028 date: June 3
- Frequency: annual

The Saiō Matsuri (斎王まつり) is a 2-day festival held on the first weekend of June in the town of Meiwa, Mie Prefecture in Japan. The Saiō Matsuri celebrates the town's history of once being an Imperial residence. The festival re-enacts the march of the Saiō and her entourage to the nearby Ise Shrine. The festival consists of over 100 people dressed in spectacular Heian period costume, marching down a section of the Ise Kada, the old Ise Pilgrimage road, toward the Saikū Historical Museum (斎宮歴史博物館). 2006 saw the celebration of the 24th annual Saiō Matsuri.

== See also ==
- Aoi Matsuri in Kyoto
