= Saikū =

- 斎宮 (Japanese)
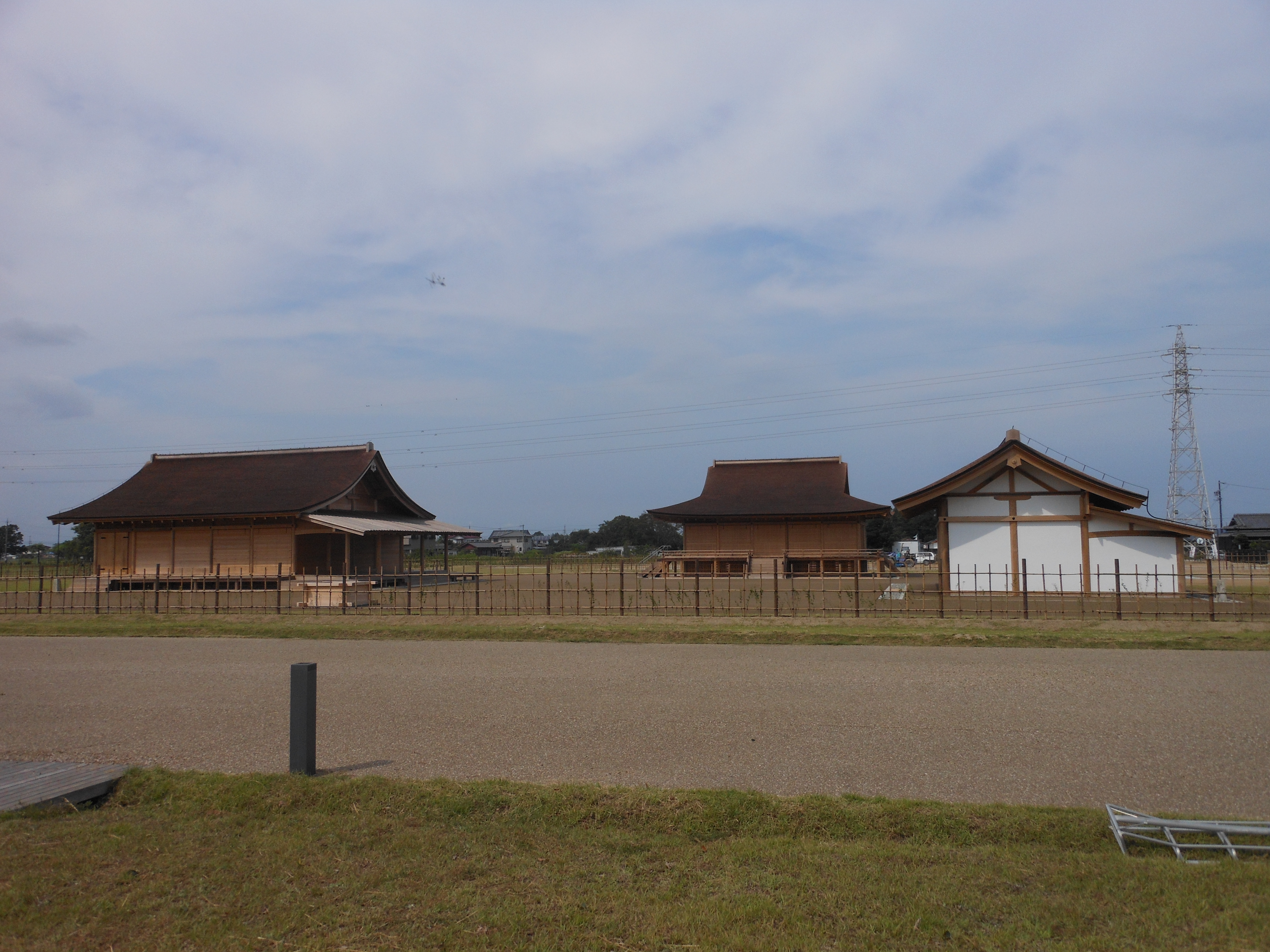
- Reconstructed halls of the Saikū in Meiwa

- Saikū Saikū (Japan)
- 34.541207°N 136.616836°E
- Type: settlement
- Periods: Nara through Nanboku-chō period
- Location: Meiwa, Mie, Japan
- Region: Kansai region

Site notes
- Public access: Yes (museum)

The Saikū (斎宮) was a palace complex located in what is now the Takegawa neighborhood of the town of Meiwa, Taki District, Mie Prefecture, Japan. Forming a small village, it was established in the Nara period as the palace and public offices of the Saiō, an unmarried Imperial princess who served at Ise Shrine on behalf of the emperor, and fell into ruins in the Nanboku-chō period. The site was designated a National Historic Site in 1979. The Saikū is also referred to as the "Bamboo Palace", Saigū, Itsuki no Miya, Iwai no Miya or Imimiya

== Overview ==
The Saikū was located approximately ten kilometers north-west of Ise Shrine, arguably the most significant Shinto shrine in Japan. The Saikū was situated on the right bank of the Kushida River and its tributary, the Harai River, which flows into Ise Bay. The original layout covered an area measuring two kilometers east-to-west by 700 meters north-to-south, or 137 hectares. The town was built on a grid structure based on Chinese traditions and consisted of several large blocks of 120 metres in length, surrounded by high wooden walls. Inside each block were more than 100 buildings in the shinden-zukuri style, with varying size and purpose, built of Japanese cypress in the method of the day, using interlocking blocks of wood to hold the structure together without nails. The buildings were rectangular in shape and built on poles dug into the ground, with a floor raised up to a meter from the ground. Some blocks contained a small well from which to draw water, or shrines or structures for food storage.

== History ==
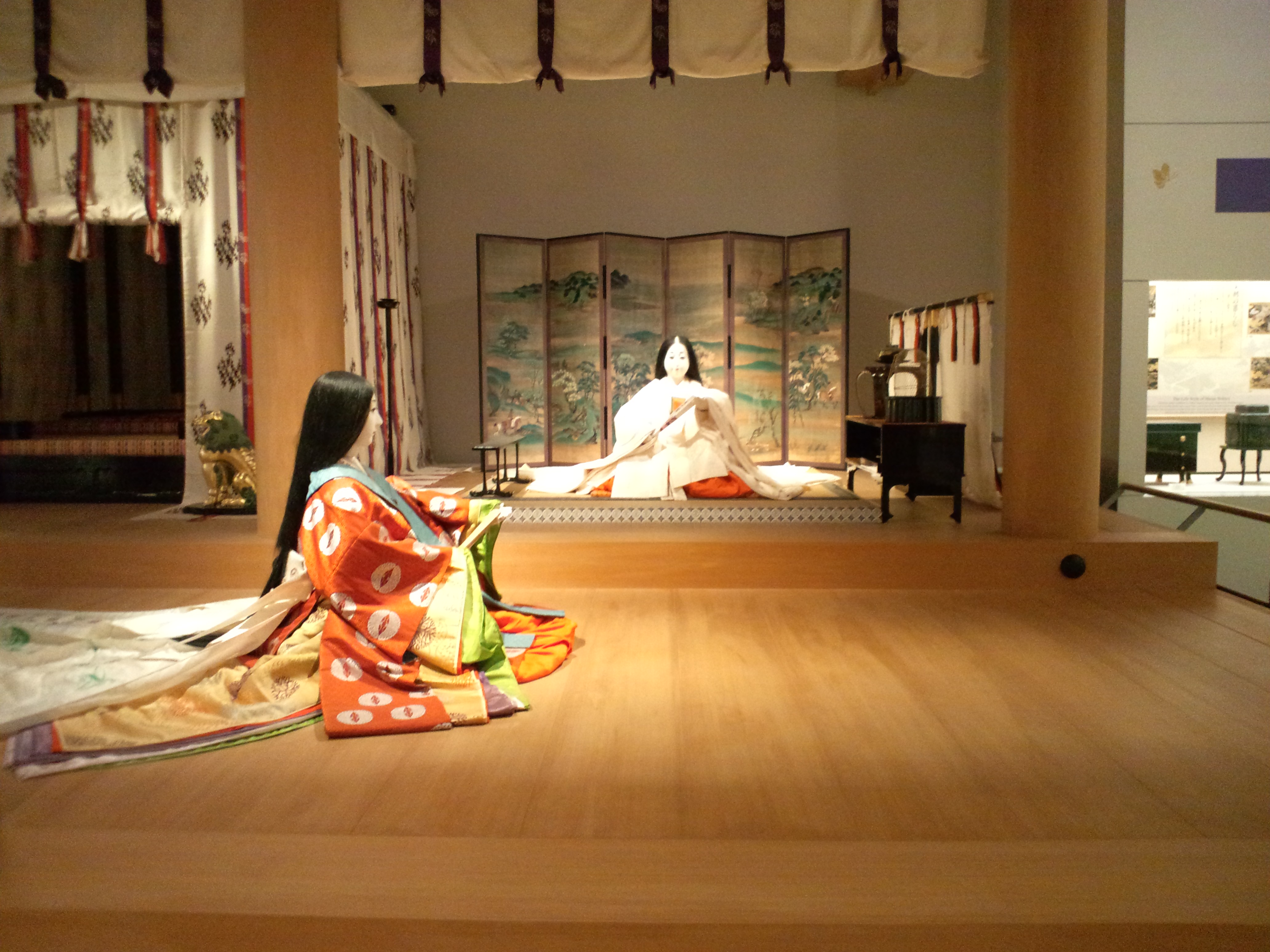
Display item the room of the Saiō, in the Saikū Historical Museum

Saikū reached its peak from the late Nara period to the early Heian period. Engishiki records from the early Heian period indicate that the Saiō had a staff of more than 500 people, including some 120 officials. The Saikū was thus much larger than most district government complexes around the country, and was often referred to as the second-largest provincial settlement, after Dazaifu. After the collapse of the Saiō system, the town reverted to a rice-farming village and the exact location of Saikū was lost. While digging foundations for new housing development in 1970, a large haniwa horse was found, one of the largest found in Japan. The housing construction was halted and archaeological excavations began, confirming the site as that of the ancient Saikū town. A large number of shards of various earthenware, green glazed pottery, and circular inkstones were found, followed by the foundations of many structures.

Further excavations take place annually on a relatively small scale, with much of the Saikū site still untouched due to its vast size. As the ancient buildings were made of wood, which has long since disappeared, and the site was redeveloped several times over its long history, excavations can reveal several generations of buildings whose foundations must be matched together to form a view of the town's layout. Most focus is given to the early Heian period, when the town was at its peak in size and influence. The Saikū Historical Museum now stands on the site of the original discovery and is about a three-minute walk from Saikū Station on the Kintetsu Yamada Line. In addition to the museum, a reconstructed Heian period residence, known as Itsukinomiya Hall of Historical Experience, has been built next to Saikū train station. Itsukinomiya Hall is not a restoration of a former building, but a reconstruction based on existing shinden-zukuri buildings elsewhere in Japan.

== See also ==
- List of Historic Sites of Japan (Mie)
