= Heian period =

Period of Japanese history from 794 to 1185

- 794–1185
Nara period	Kamakura period
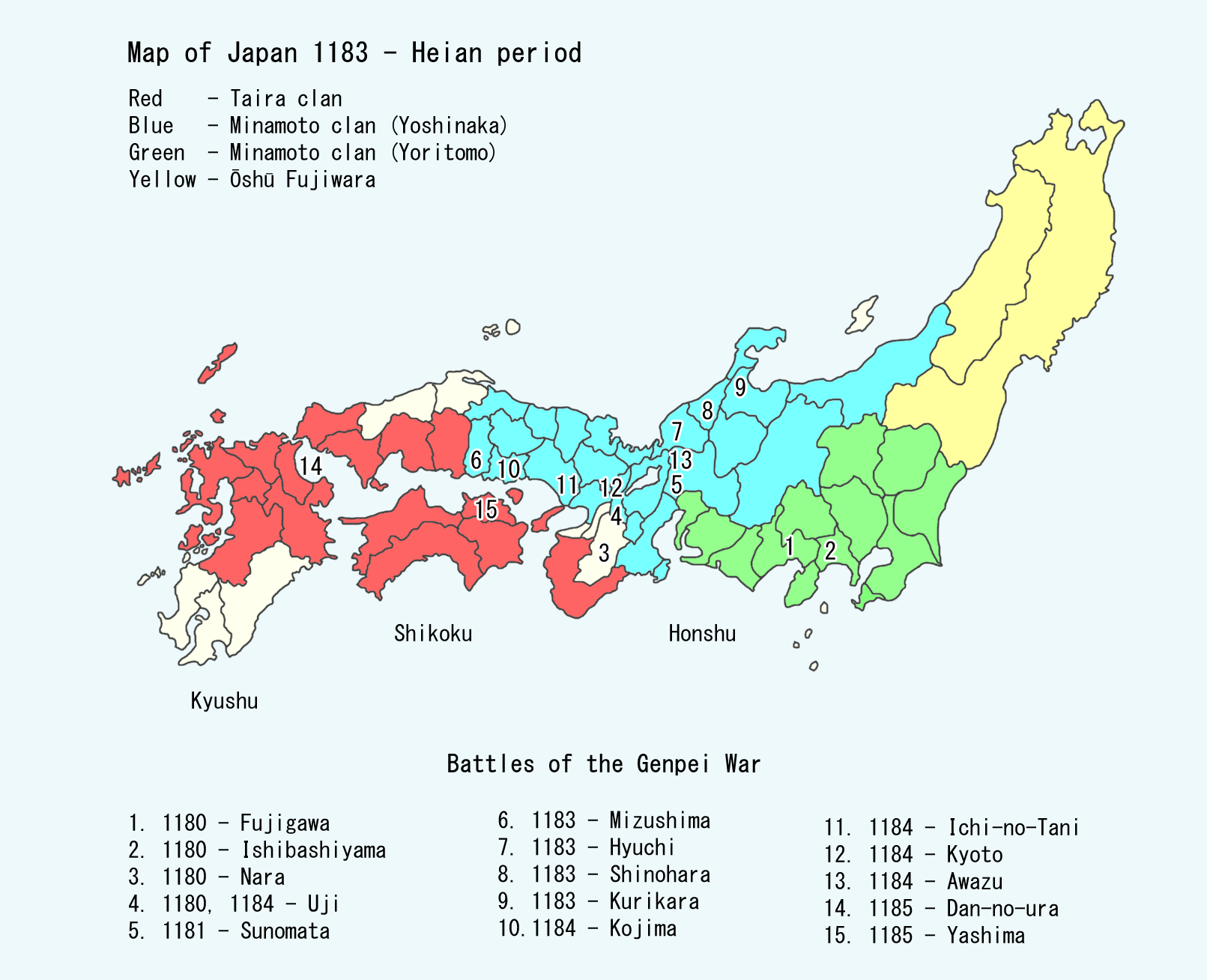
- The domain of notable clans in Japan (1183)
- Location: Japan
- Leaders: Emperor Kanmu (781–806); Fujiwara no Yoshifusa (858–872); Fujiwara no Morozane (1075–1086); Emperor Antoku (1180-1185)
- Key events: Fujiwara clan rule starts (858); Fujiwara clan overthrown (1068); Taira no Kiyomori seizes power (1156); Battle of Dan-no-ura (1185)

The Heian period (平安時代, Heian jidai) is the last division of classical Japanese history, running from 794 to 1185. It followed the Nara period, beginning when the 50th emperor, Emperor Kammu, moved the capital of Japan to Heian-kyō (modern Kyoto). Heian (平安) means 'peace' in Japanese. It is a period in Japanese history when the Chinese influences were in decline and the national culture matured. The Heian period is also considered the peak of the Japanese imperial court, noted for its art, especially poetry and literature. Two syllabaries unique to Japan, katakana and hiragana, emerged during this time. This gave rise to Japan's famous vernacular literature, with many of its texts written by court ladies who were not as educated in Chinese as their male counterparts.

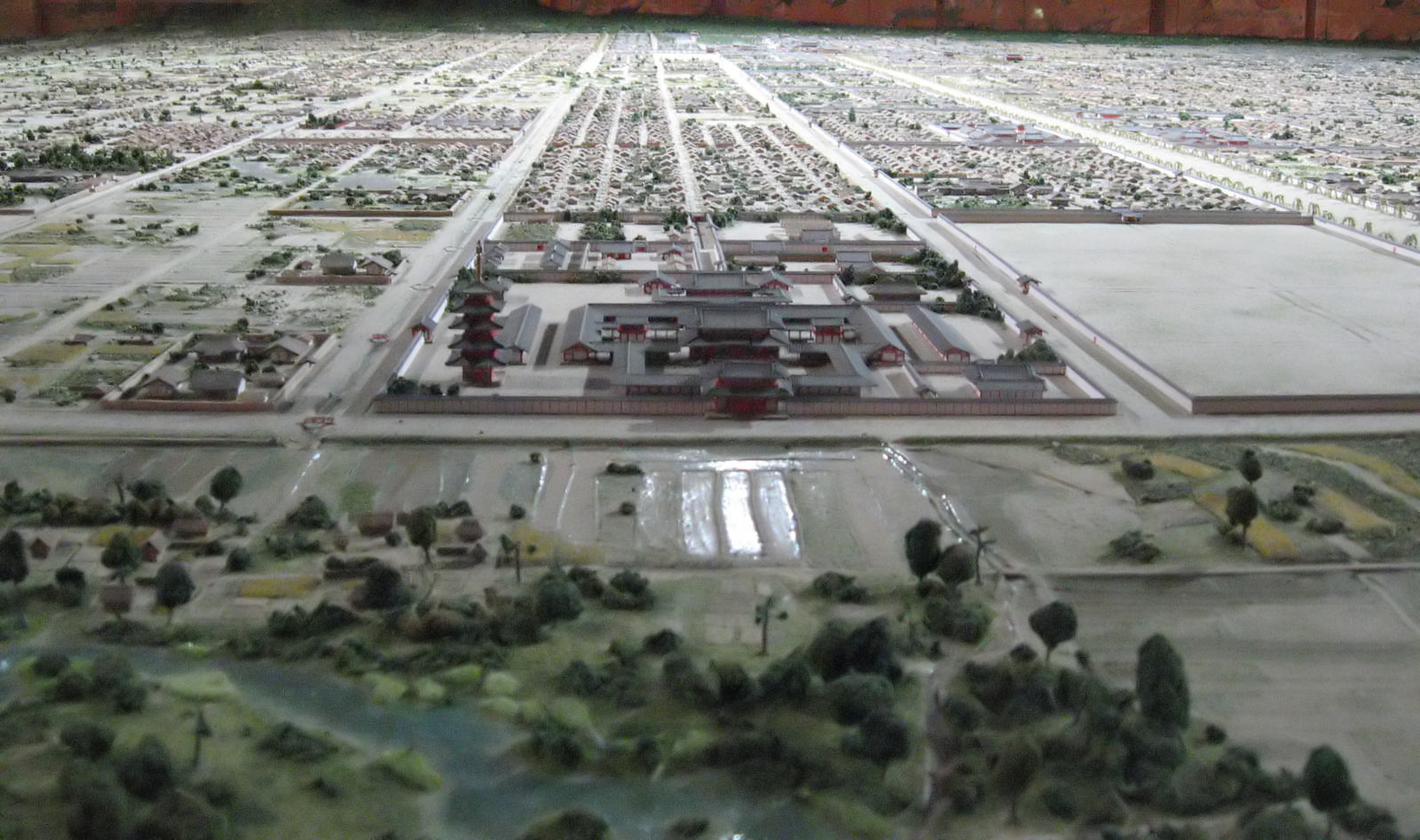
Miniature model of Heian-kyō, the capital during the Heian period

Although the Imperial House of Japan had power on the surface, the real power was in the hands of the Fujiwara clan, a powerful aristocratic family who had intermarried with the imperial family; most Emperors of the Heian era had mothers from the Fujiwara family. The economy mostly existed through barter and trade due to the lack of a national currency, while the shōen system encouraged the growth of aristocratic estates that began gradually asserting their independence from Imperial control. Despite a lack of serious warfare or domestic strife during the Heian era, crime and banditry were widespread as the Emperors failed to police the country effectively.

== History ==
The Heian period was preceded by the Nara period and began in 794 CE after the movement of the capital of Japan to Heian-kyō (modern Kyoto), by the 50th emperor, Emperor Kanmu. Kanmu first tried to move the capital to Nagaoka-kyō (modern Kyoto), but a series of disasters befell the city, prompting the emperor to relocate the capital a second time, to Heian. A rebellion occurred in China toward the end of the 9th century, making the political situation unstable. The Japanese missions to Tang China were suspended and the influx of Chinese exports halted, a fact which facilitated the independent growth of Japanese culture called kokufū bunka (国風文化). Eventually, the eastern province of Hitachi (modern Ibaraki), and almost simultaneously, Fujiwara no Sumitomo rebelled in the west; samurai played a crucial role in suppressing both disturbances on behalf of the Emperor. In the rebellious north, the latter half of the 11th century saw the Former Nine Years War and the Latter Three Years' War between the central government and the Abe and Kiyohara clan respectively. Still, a true military takeover of the Japanese government was centuries away, when much of the strength of the government would lie within the private armies of the shogunate.

By the 12th century, court authority weakened as the decentralized land allocation system managed by aristocratic vassals, preferring life at court over regional administration, made the system increasingly ineffective. The entry of the warrior class into court influence was a result of the 1156 Hōgen Rebellion. At this time Taira no Kiyomori revived the Fujiwara practices by placing his grandson on the throne to rule Japan by regency. Their clan, the Taira, would not be overthrown until after the Genpei War, which marked the start of the Kamakura shogunate. The Kamakura period began in 1185 when the family of Minamoto no Yoritomo seized power from the emperors and established the shogunate in their ancestral home, Kamakura.

=== Fujiwara regency ===
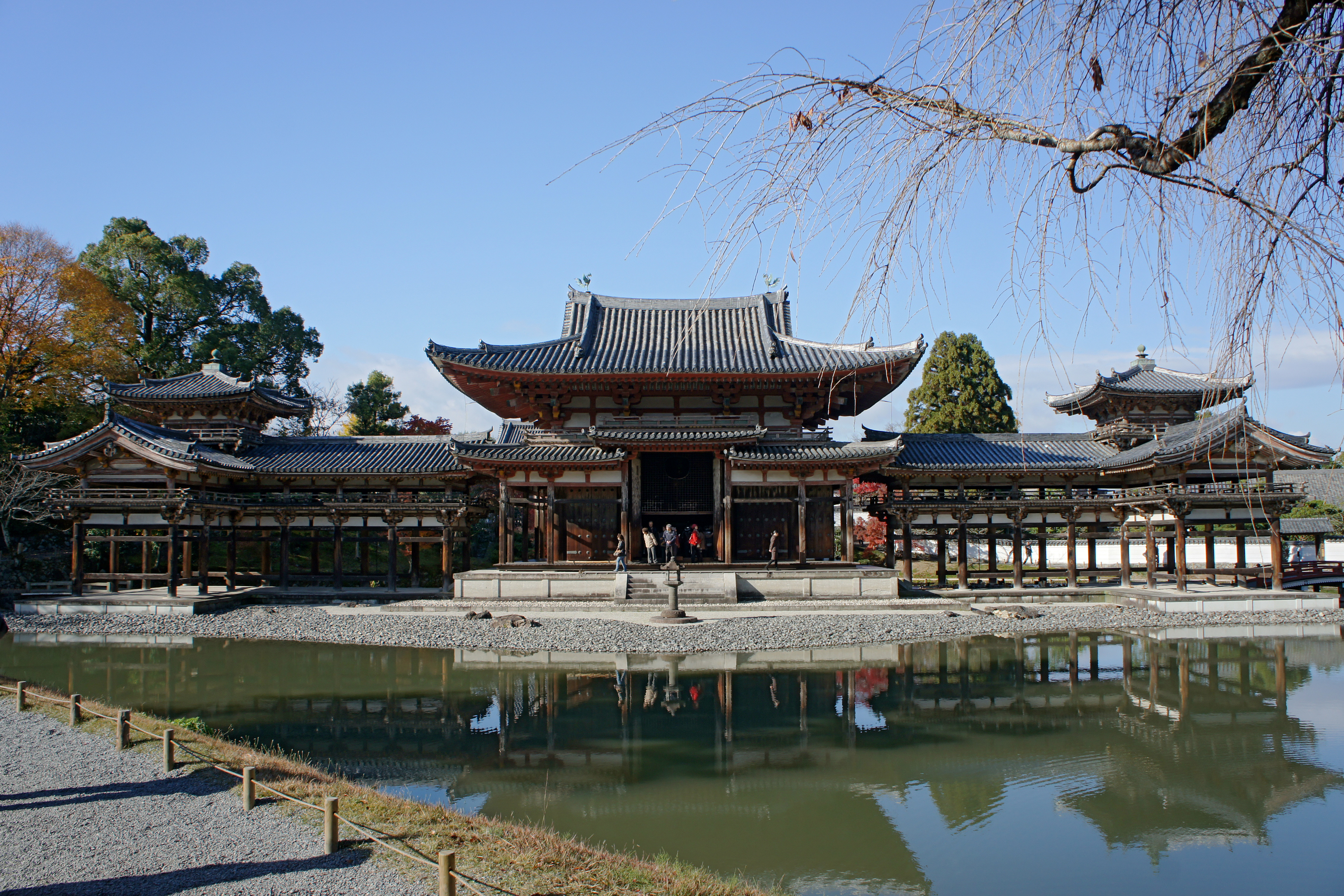
Byōdō-in ("Phoenix Hall"), built in the 11th century (Uji, Kyoto)

When Emperor Kammu moved the capital to Heian-kyō (Kyoto), which remained the imperial capital for the next 1,000 years, he did so not only to strengthen imperial authority but also to improve his seat of government geopolitically. Nara was abandoned after only 70 years in part due to the ascendancy of the Buddhist monk Dōkyō and the encroaching secular power of the Buddhist institutions there. Kyoto had good river access to the sea and could be reached by land routes from the eastern provinces. The early Heian period (784–967) continued Nara culture; the Heian capital was patterned on the Chinese Tang capital at Chang'an, as was Nara, but on a larger scale than Nara. Kammu endeavored to improve the Tang-style administrative system which was in use. Known as the Ritsuryō Code, this system attempted to recreate the Tang legal system in Japan, despite the "tremendous differences in the levels of development between the two countries". Despite the decline of the Taika–Taihō reforms, the imperial government was vigorous during the early Heian period. Kammu's avoidance of drastic reform decreased the intensity of political struggles, and he became recognized as one of Japan's most forceful emperors.

Although Kammu had abandoned universal conscription in 792, he still waged major military offensives to subjugate the Emishi, possible descendants of the displaced Jōmon, living in northern and eastern Japan. After making temporary gains in 794, in 797, Kammu appointed a new commander, Sakanoue no Tamuramaro, under the title Seii Taishōgun (征夷大将軍, "Barbarian-subduing generalissimo"). By 801, the shōgun had defeated the Emishi and had extended the imperial domains to the eastern end of Honshū. Imperial control over the provinces was tenuous at best, however. In the 9th and 10th centuries, much authority was lost to the great families, who disregarded the Chinese-style land and tax systems imposed by the government in Kyoto. Stability came to Japan, but, even though succession was ensured for the imperial family through heredity, power again concentrated in the hands of one noble family, the Fujiwara.

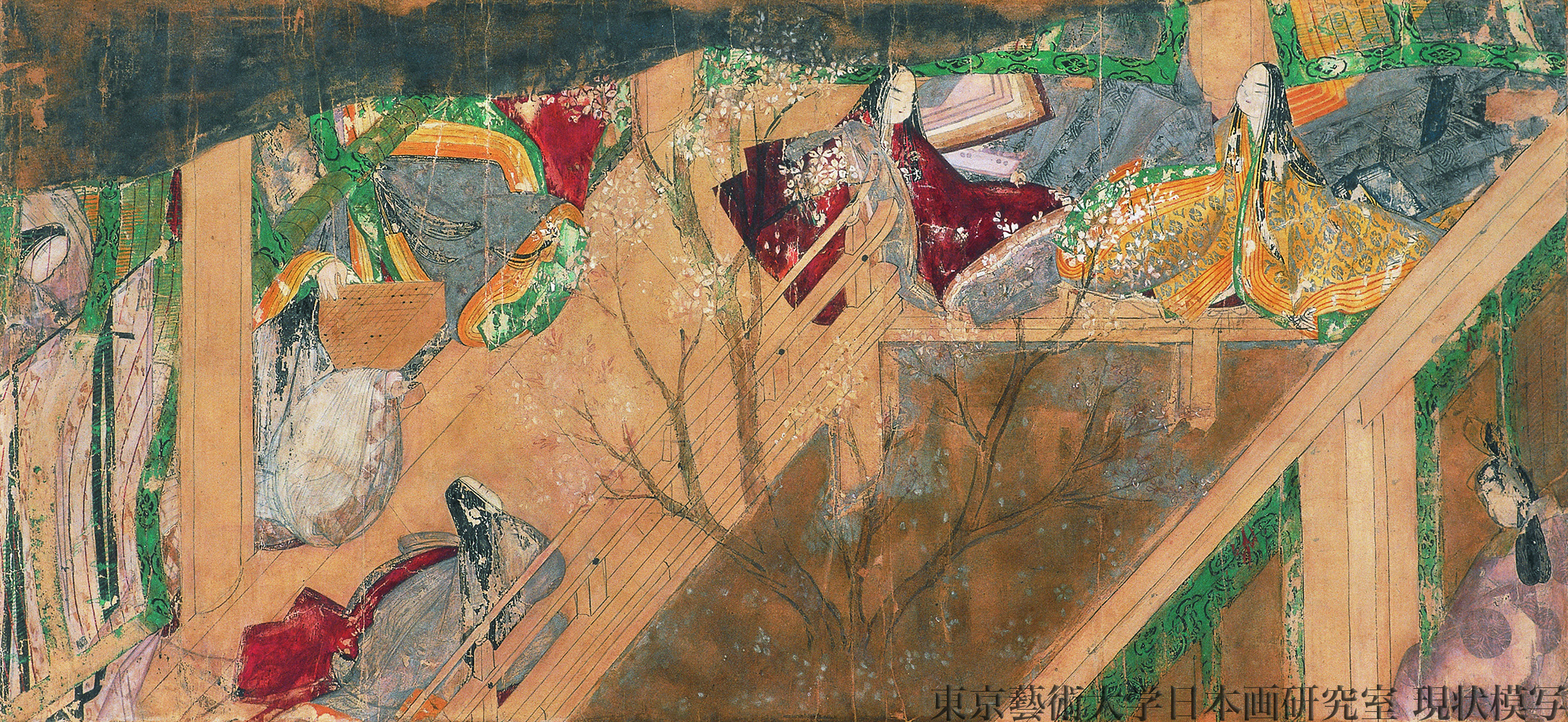
Section of a handscroll depicting a scene from the "Bamboo River" chapter of the Tale of Genji, c. 1130

Following Kammu's death in 806 and a succession struggle among his sons, two new offices were established in an effort to adjust the Taika–Taihō administrative structure. Through the new Emperor's Private Office, the emperor could issue administrative edicts more directly and with more self-assurance than before. The new Metropolitan Police Board replaced the largely ceremonial imperial guard units. While these two offices strengthened the emperor's position temporarily, soon they and other Chinese-style structures were bypassed in the developing state. In 838 the end of the imperial-sanctioned missions to Tang China, which had begun in 630, marked the effective end of Chinese influence. Tang China was in a state of decline, and Chinese Buddhists were severely persecuted, undermining Japanese respect for Chinese institutions. Japan began to turn inward.

As the Soga clan had taken control of the throne in the sixth century, the Fujiwara by the 9th century had intermarried with the imperial family, and one of their members was the first head of the Emperor's Private Office. Another Fujiwara became regent, Sesshō for his grandson, then a minor emperor and yet another was appointed Kampaku. Toward the end of the 9th century, several emperors tried but failed to check the Fujiwara. For a time, however, during the reign of Emperor Daigo (897–930), the Fujiwara regency was suspended as he ruled directly.

Nevertheless, the Fujiwara were not demoted by Daigo but actually became stronger during his reign. Central control of Japan had continued to decline, and the Fujiwara, along with other great families and religious foundations, acquired ever larger shōen and greater wealth during the early 10th century. By the early Heian period, the shōen had obtained legal status, and the large religious establishments sought clear titles in perpetuity, waiver of taxes, and immunity from government inspection of the shōen they held. Those people who worked the land found it advantageous to transfer title to shōen holders in return for a share of the harvest. People and lands were increasingly beyond central control and taxation, a de facto return to conditions before the Taika Reform.

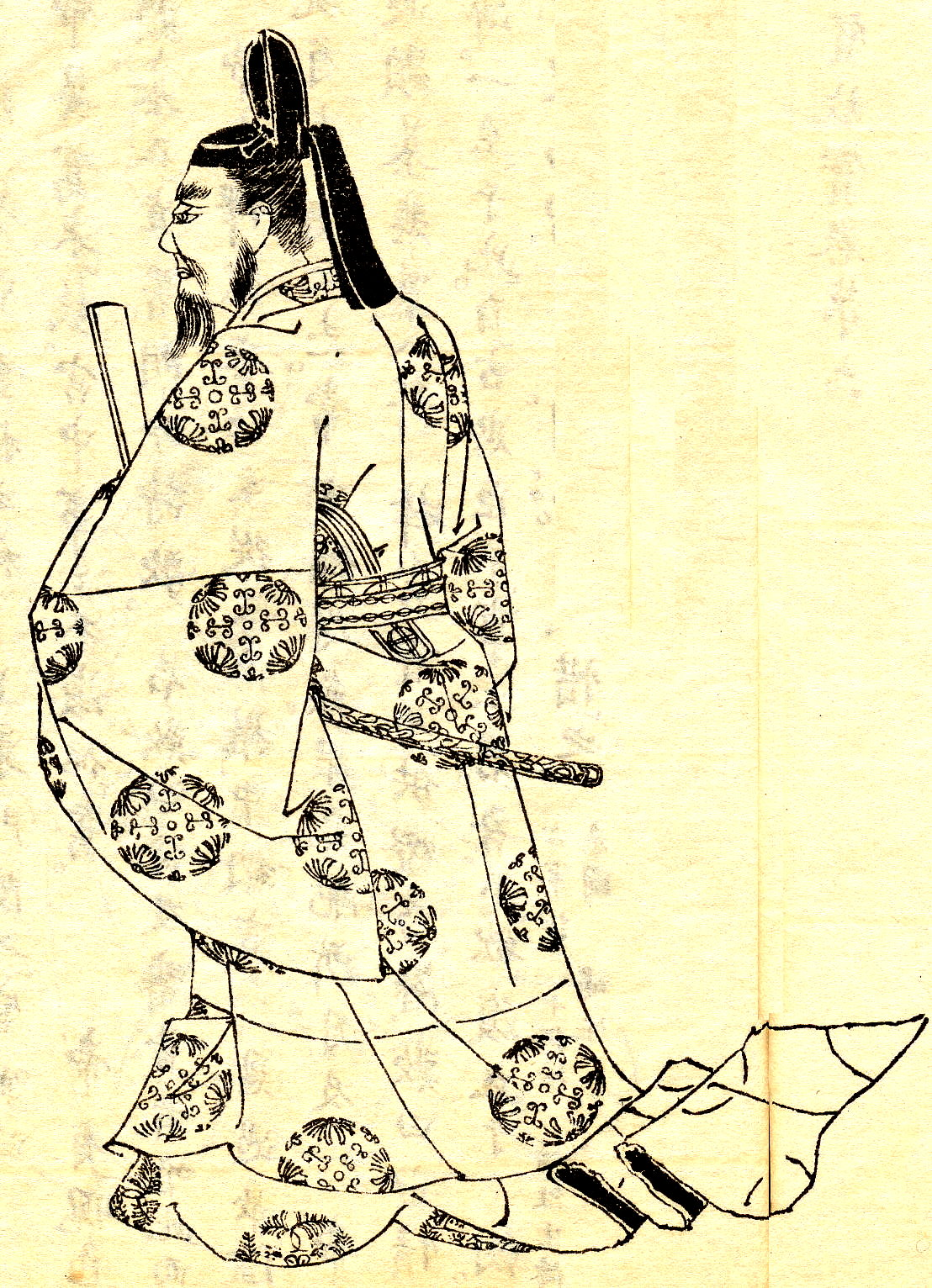
Drawing of Fujiwara no Michinaga, by Kikuchi Yōsai

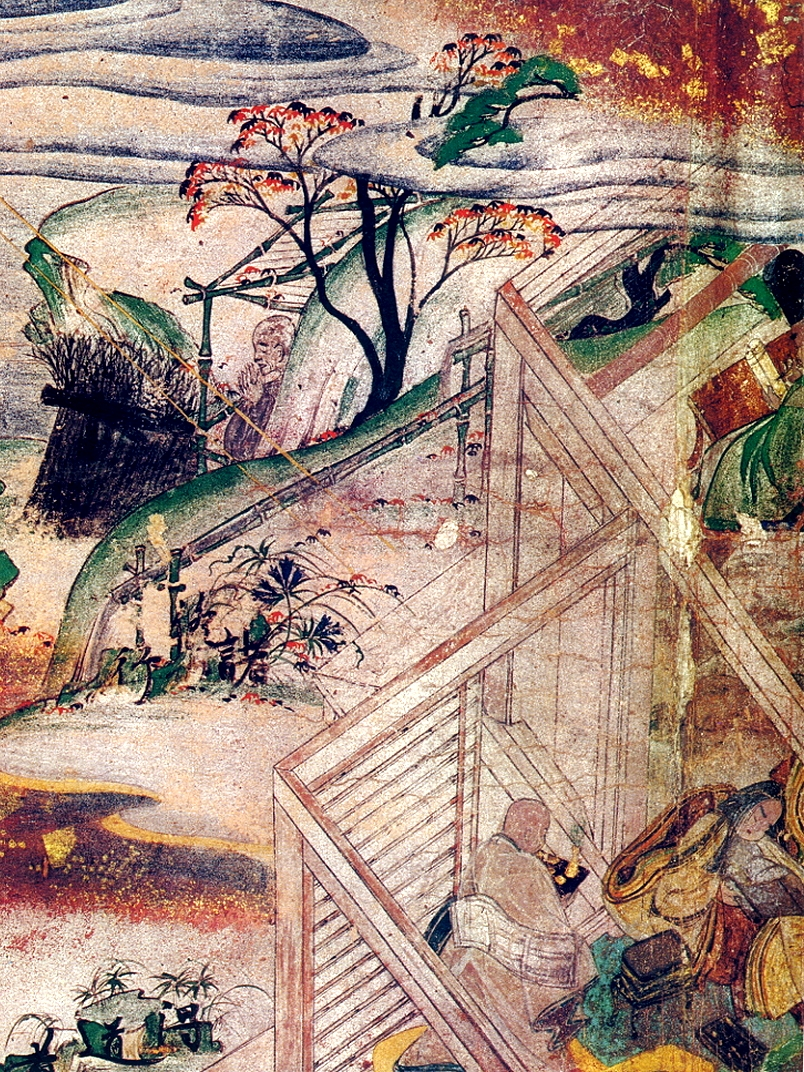
Illustrated section of the Lotus Sutra, from the Heike Nōkyō collection of texts, 1167

Within decades of Daigo's death, the Fujiwara had absolute control over the court. By the year 1000, Fujiwara no Michinaga was able to enthrone and dethrone emperors at will. Little authority was left for traditional institutions, and government affairs were handled through the Fujiwara clan's private administration. The Fujiwara had become what historian George B. Sansom has called "hereditary dictators".

Despite their usurpation of imperial authority, the Fujiwara presided over a period of cultural and artistic flowering at the imperial court and among the aristocracy. There was great interest in graceful poetry and vernacular literature. Two types of phonetic Japanese script: katakana, a simplified script that was developed by using parts of Chinese characters, was abbreviated to hiragana, a cursive syllabary with a distinct writing method that was uniquely Japanese. Hiragana gave written expression to the spoken word and, with it, to the rise in Japan's famous vernacular literature, much of it written by court women who had not been trained in Chinese as had their male counterparts. Three late-10th and early-11th century women presented their views of life and romance at the Heian court in Kagerō Nikki by "the mother of Fujiwara Michitsuna", The Pillow Book by Sei Shōnagon and The Tale of Genji by Murasaki Shikibu. Indigenous art also flourished under the Fujiwara after centuries of imitating Chinese forms. Vividly colored yamato-e, Japanese style paintings of court life and stories about temples and shrines became common in the mid-to-late Heian period, setting patterns for Japanese art to this day.

As culture flourished, so did decentralization. Whereas the first phase of shōen development in the early Heian period had seen the opening of new lands and the granting of the use of lands to aristocrats and religious institutions, the second phase saw the growth of patrimonial "house governments", as in the old clan system. In fact, the form of the old clan system had remained largely intact within the great old centralized government. New institutions were now needed in the face of social, economic, and political changes. The Taihō Code lapsed, its institutions relegated to ceremonial functions. Family administrations now became public institutions. As the most powerful family, the Fujiwara governed Japan and determined the general affairs of state, such as succession to the throne. Family and state affairs were thoroughly intermixed, a pattern followed among other families, monasteries, and even the imperial family. Land management became the primary occupation of the aristocracy, not so much because direct control by the imperial family or central government had declined but more from strong family solidarity and a lack of a sense of Japan as a single nation.

=== Rise of the military class ===
Under the early courts, when military conscription had been centrally controlled, military affairs had been taken out of the hands of the provincial aristocracy. But as the system broke down after 792, local power holders again became the primary source of military strength. The re-establishment of an efficient military system was made gradually through a process of trial-and-error. At that time the imperial court did not possess an army but rather relied on an organization of professional warriors composed mainly of oryoshi, which were appointed to an individual province and tsuibushi, which were appointed over imperial circuits or for specific tasks. This gave rise to the Japanese military class. Nonetheless, final authority rested with the imperial court.

Shōen holders had access to manpower and, as they obtained improved military technology (such as new training methods, more powerful bows, armor, horses, and superior swords) and faced worsening local conditions in the 9th century, military service became part of shōen life. Not only the shōen but also civil and religious institutions formed private guard units to protect themselves. Gradually, the provincial upper class was transformed into a new military elite of samurai.

Bushi interests were diverse, cutting across old power structures to form new associations in the 10th century. Mutual interests, family connections, and kinship were consolidated in military groups that became part of family administration. In time, large regional military families formed around members of the court aristocracy who had become prominent provincial figures. These military families gained prestige from connections to the imperial court and court-granted military titles and access to manpower. The Fujiwara family, Taira clan, and Minamoto clan were among the most prominent families supported by the new military class.

A decline in food production, the growth of the population, and competition for resources among the great families all led to the gradual decline of Fujiwara power and gave rise to military disturbances in the mid-10th and 11th centuries. Members of the Fujiwara, Taira, and Minamoto families—all of whom had descended from the imperial family—attacked one another, claimed control over vast tracts of conquered land, set up rival regimes, and generally upset the peace.

The Fujiwara controlled the throne until the reign of Emperor Go-Sanjō (1068–1073), the first emperor not born of a Fujiwara mother since the 9th century. Go-Sanjo, determined to restore imperial control through strong personal rule, implemented reforms to curb Fujiwara influence. He also established an office to compile and validate estate records with the aim of reasserting central control. Many shōen were not properly certified, and large landholders, like the Fujiwara, felt threatened with the loss of their lands. Go-Sanjo also established the In-no-chō (院庁 "Office of the Cloistered Emperor"), which was held by a succession of emperors who abdicated to devote themselves to behind-the-scenes governance, or insei.

==== Decline of the Fujiwara ====
The In-no-chō filled the void left by the decline of Fujiwara power. Rather than being banished, the Fujiwara were mostly retained in their old positions of civil dictator and minister of the center while being bypassed in decision making. In time, many of the Fujiwara were replaced, mostly by members of the rising Minamoto clan. While the Fujiwara fell into disputes among themselves and formed northern and southern factions, the insei system allowed the paternal line of the imperial family to gain influence over the throne. The period from 1086 to 1156 was the age of supremacy of the In-no-chō and of the rise of the military class throughout the country. Military might rather than civil authority dominated the government.

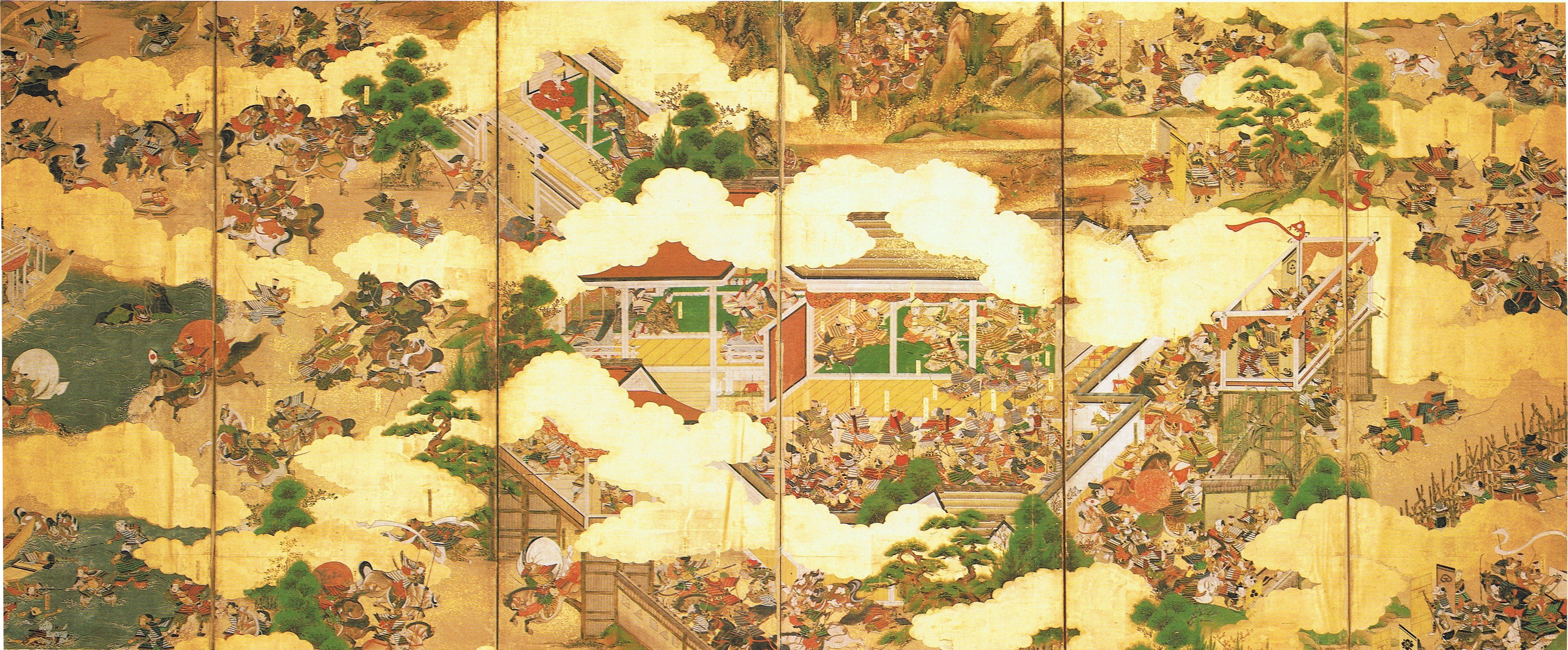
"Genpei Kassen-zu Byōbu" / Akama Shrine Collection

A struggle for succession in the mid-12th century gave the Fujiwara an opportunity to regain their former power. Fujiwara no Yorinaga sided with the retired emperor in a violent battle in 1156 against the heir apparent, who was supported by the Taira and Minamoto (Hōgen Rebellion). In the end, the Fujiwara were destroyed, the old system of government supplanted, and the insei system left powerless as bushi took control of court affairs, marking a turning point in Japanese history. In 1159, the Taira and Minamoto clashed (Heiji Rebellion), and a twenty-year period of Taira ascendancy began.

Taira no Kiyomori emerged as the real power in Japan following the Fujiwara's destruction, and he would remain in command for the next 20 years. He gave his daughter Tokuko in marriage to the young emperor Takakura, who died at only 19, leaving their infant son Antoku to succeed to the throne. Kiyomori filled no less than 50 government posts with his relatives, rebuilt the Inland Sea, and encouraged trade with Song China. He also took aggressive actions to safeguard his power when necessary, including the removal and exile of 45 court officials and the razing of two troublesome temples, Todai-ji and Kofuku-ji.

The Taira were seduced by court life and ignored problems in the provinces, where the Minamoto clan were rebuilding their strength rapidly. In 1183, two years after Kiyomori's death, Minamoto no Yoritomo dispatched his brothers Yoshitsune and Noriyori to attack Kyoto. The Taira were routed and forced to flee, and the Empress Dowager tried to drown herself and the 6-year old Emperor. He perished, but his mother survived. Takakura's other son succeeded as Emperor Go-Toba.

With Yoritomo firmly established, the bakufu system that governed Japan for the next seven centuries was in place. He was granted court authority to appoint military governors, or shugo, to rule over the provinces, and stewards, or jito to supervise public and private estates, thus ensuring order with the gokenin (vassals). Yoritomo then turned his attention to the elimination of the powerful Fujiwara family, which sheltered his rebellious brother Yoshitsune. Three years later, he was appointed shōgun in Kyoto. One year before his death in 1199, Yoritomo expelled the teenaged emperor Go-Toba from the throne. Two of Go-Toba's sons succeeded him, but they would also be removed by Yoritomo's successors to the shogunate.

== Culture ==
=== Developments in Buddhism ===
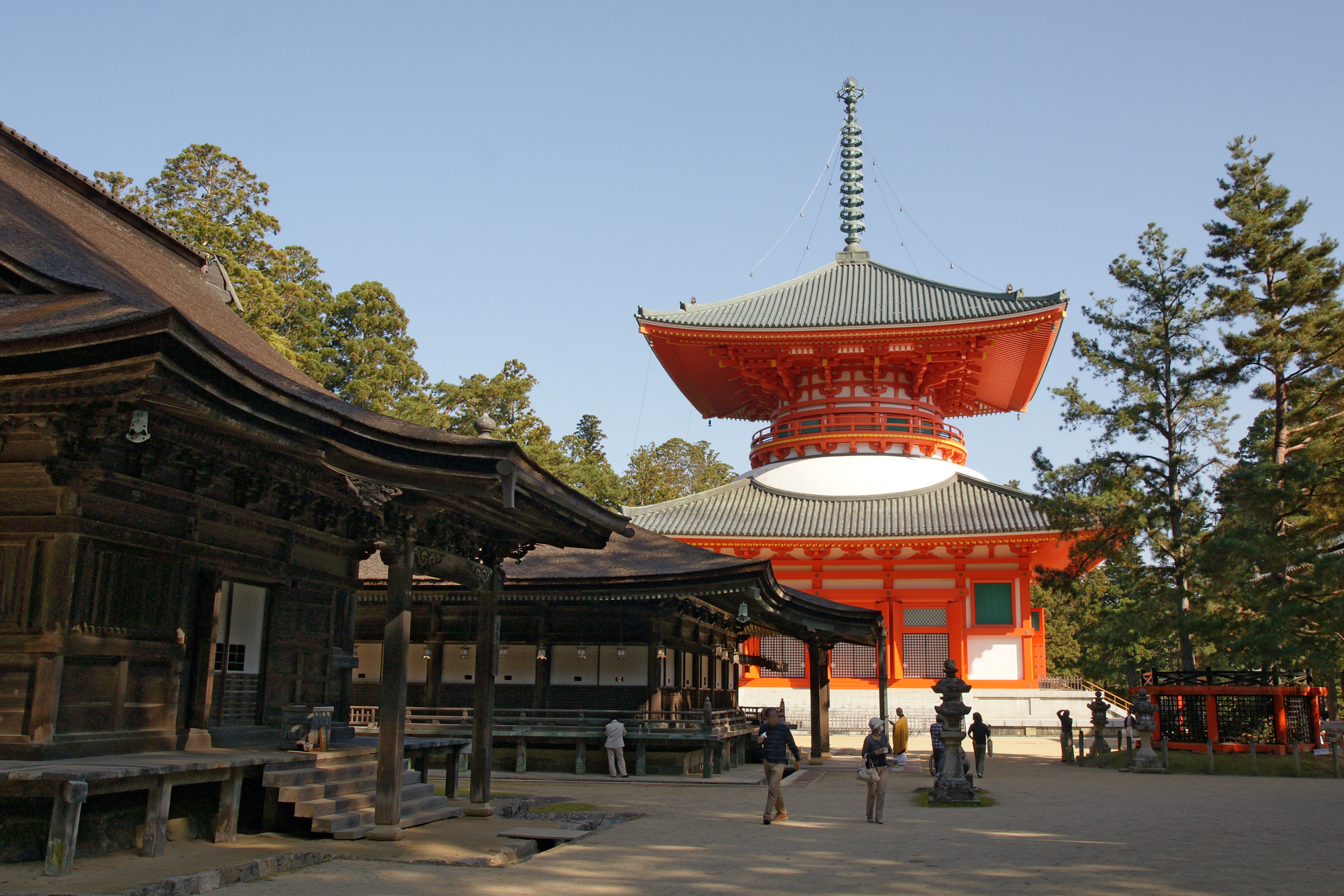
Danjō-garan on Mount Kōya, a sacred center of Shingon Buddhism

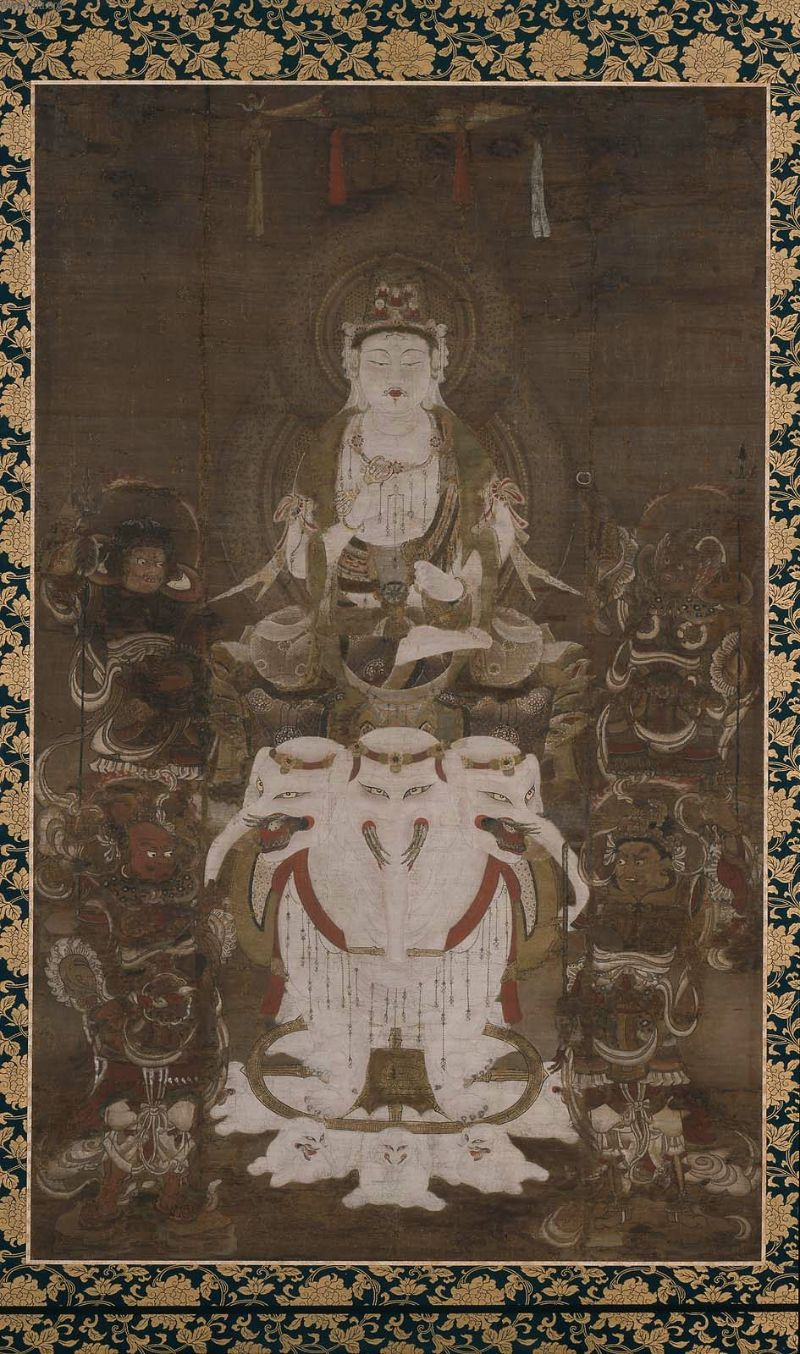
Painting of the bodhisattva Fugen Enmei (Samantabhadra). Ink on silk, 12th century

Statue of Kōmokuten (Virupaksa), the Heavenly King of the West. Wood, 12th century

The Heian period saw the rise of two esoteric Buddhist sects, Tendai and Shingon.

Tendai is the Japanese version of the Tiantai school from China, which is based on the Lotus Sutra, one of the most important sutras in Mahayana Buddhism. It was brought to Japan by the monk Saichō. An important element of Tendai doctrine was the suggestion that enlightenment was accessible to "every creature". Saichō also sought independent ordination for Tendai monks. A close relationship developed between the Tendai monastery complex on Mount Hiei and the imperial court in its new capital at the foot of the mountain. As a result, Tendai emphasized great reverence for the emperor and the nation. Emperor Kanmu himself was a notable patron of the otherworldly Tendai sect, which rose to great power over the ensuing centuries.

Shingon is the Japanese version of the Zhen'yan school from China, which is based on Vajrayana Buddhism. It was brought to Japan by the monk Kūkai. Shingon Buddhism emphasizes the use of symbols, rituals, incantations and mandalas, which gave it a wide appeal. Kūkai greatly impressed the emperors who succeeded Emperor Kammu, and also generations of Japanese, not only with his holiness but also with his poetry, calligraphy, painting, and sculpture. Both Kūkai and Saichō aimed to connect state and religion and establish support from the aristocracy, leading to the notion of "aristocratic Buddhism".

=== Literature ===
Although written Chinese (kanbun) remained the official language of the Heian period imperial court, the introduction and widespread use of kana saw a boom in Japanese literature. Despite the establishment of several new literary genres such as the novel and narrative monogatari (物語) and essays, literacy was only common among the court and Buddhist clergy.

Poetry, in particular, was a staple of court life. Nobles and ladies-in-waiting were expected to be well versed in the art of writing poetry as a mark of their status. Any occasion could call for the writing of a verse, from the birth of a child to the coronation of an emperor, or even a pretty scene of nature. A well-written poem could easily make or break one's reputation, and often was a key part of social interaction. Almost as important was the choice of calligraphy, or handwriting, used. The Japanese of this period believed handwriting could reflect the condition of a person's soul: therefore, poor or hasty writing could be considered a sign of poor breeding. Whether the script was Chinese or Japanese, good writing and artistic skill were paramount to social reputation when it came to poetry. Sei Shōnagon mentions in her Pillow Book that when a certain courtier tried to ask her advice about how to write a poem to the Empress Sadako, she had to politely rebuke him because his writing was so poor.

The lyrics of the modern Japanese national anthem, Kimigayo, were written in the Heian period, as was The Tale of Genji by Murasaki Shikibu, which was extremely important to the Heian court, and one of the first novels ever written. Murasaki Shikibu's contemporary and rival Sei Shōnagon's revealing observations and musings as an attendant in the Empress' court were recorded collectively as The Pillow Book in the 990s, which revealed the quotidian capital lifestyle. The Heian period produced a flowering of poetry including works of Ariwara no Narihira, Ono no Komachi, Izumi Shikibu, Murasaki Shikibu, Saigyō and Fujiwara no Teika. The famous Japanese poem known as the Iroha (いろは), of uncertain authorship, was also written during the Heian period.

=== Beauty ===
During the Heian period, beauty was widely considered an important part of what made one a "good" person. In cosmetic terms, aristocratic men and women powdered their faces and blackened their teeth, the latter termed ohaguro. The male courtly ideal included a faint mustache and thin goatee, while women's mouths were painted small and red, and their eyebrows were plucked or shaved and redrawn higher on the forehead (hikimayu).

Women cultivated shiny, black flowing hair and a courtly woman's formal dress included a complex "twelve-layered robe" called jūnihitoe, though the actual number of layers varied. Costumes were determined by office and season, with a woman's robes, in particular, following a system of color combinations representing flowers, plants, and animals specific to a season or month, (see the Japanese Wikipedia entries irome and kasane-no-irome).

== Economics ==
While the Heian period was an unusually long period of peace, it can also be argued that the period weakened Japan economically and led to poverty for all but a tiny few of its inhabitants. The control of rice fields provided a key source of income for families such as the Fujiwara and was a fundamental base of their power. The aristocratic beneficiaries of Heian culture, the Ryōmin (良民 "Good People") numbered about 5,000 in a land of perhaps five million. One reason the samurai were able to take power was that the ruling nobility proved incompetent at managing Japan and its provinces. By the year 1000, the government no longer knew how to issue currency and money was gradually disappearing. Instead of a fully realized system of money circulation, rice was the primary unit of exchange. The lack of a solid medium of economic exchange is implicitly illustrated in novels of the time. For instance, messengers were rewarded with useful objects such as an old silk kimono, rather than being paid a monetary fee.

The Fujiwara rulers failed to maintain adequate police forces, which left robbers free to prey on travelers. This is implicitly illustrated in novels by the terror that night travel inspired in the main characters. The shōen system enabled the accumulation of wealth by an aristocratic elite; the economic surplus can be linked to the cultural developments of the Heian period and the "pursuit of arts". The major Buddhist temples in Heian-kyō and Nara also made use of the shōen. The establishment of branches rurally and integration of some Shinto shrines within these temple networks reflects a greater "organizational dynamism".

== Events ==
- 784: Emperor Kanmu moves the capital to Nagaoka-kyō (Kyōto)
- 794: Emperor Kammu moves the capital to Heian-kyō (Kyōto)
- 804: The Buddhist monk Saichō (Dengyo Daishi) introduces the Tendai school
- 806: The monk Kūkai (Kōbō-Daishi) introduces the Shingon (Tantric) school
- 819: Kūkai founds the monastery of Mount Kōya, in the northeast portion of modern-day Wakayama Prefecture
- 858: Emperor Seiwa begins the rule of the Fujiwara clan
- 895: Sugawara no Michizane halted the imperial embassies to China
- 990: Sei Shōnagon writes the Pillow Book essays
- 1000–1008: Murasaki Shikibu writes The Tale of Genji novel
- 1050: Rise of the military class (samurai)
- 1052: The Byōdō-in temple (near Kyōto) is built by Fujiwara no Yorimichi
- 1068: Emperor Go-Sanjō overthrows the Fujiwara clan
- 1087: Emperor Shirakawa abdicates and becomes a Buddhist monk, the first of the "cloistered emperors" (insei)
- 1156: Taira no Kiyomori defeats the Minamoto clan and seizes power, thereby ending the "insei" era
- 1180 (June): The capital is moved to Fukuhara-kyō (Kobe)
- 1180 (November): The capital is moved back to Heian-kyō (Kyōto)
- 1185: Taira is defeated (Genpei War) and Minamoto no Yoritomo with the support (backing) of the Hōjō clan seizes power, becoming the first shōgun of Japan, while the emperor (or "mikado") becomes a figurehead

== Modern depictions ==
The iconography of the Heian period is widely known in Japan, and depicted in various media, from traditional festivals to anime. Various festivals feature Heian dress – most notably Hinamatsuri (doll festival), where the dolls wear Heian dress, but also numerous other festivals, such as Aoi Matsuri in Kyoto (May) and Saiō Matsuri in Meiwa, Mie (June), both of which feature the jūnihitoe 12-layer dress. Traditional horseback archery (yabusame) festivals, which date from the beginning of the Kamakura period (immediately following the Heian period) feature similar dress.

=== Video games ===
- Cosmology of Kyoto is a 1993 Japanese video game set in 10th–11th-century Japan. It is a point-and-click adventure game depicting Heian-kyō, including the religious beliefs, folklore, and ghost tales of the time.
- Kuon is a 2004 survival horror game for the PS2 set in the Heian period.
- The 2011 video game Total War: Shogun 2 has the Rise of the Samurai expansion pack as a downloadable campaign. It allows the player to make their own version of the Genpei War which happened during the Heian period. The player is able to choose one of the most powerful families of Japan at the time, the Taira, Minamoto or Fujiwara.
- Nioh 2, a 2020 video game, released three DLC expansions that had its main protagonist time travel to key moments in the Heian period to aid Minamoto no Yoshitsune and Minamoto no Yorimitsu.
- Plants Vs. Zombies 2, specifically the Chinese Version of the game released in 2015, has a world based on the Heian Period called the Heian Age that was released in January 2021. It features unique plants and zombies that are based on the various culture that was popular during the time period. It is currently in an unfinished state, with the most recent update being from April 2021.
- The Fate series has several Servants from the Heian period in games such as Fate/Grand Order and Fate/Samurai Remnant.
- Heian City Story is a city-building simulation developed by Kairosoft which involves the player build a city based on the Heian era.
- In Civilization VII, Heian Japan is a playable civilization with the Brush and Blade Collection.

=== Manga and anime ===
- Otogi Zoshi is a 2004 anime by Production I.G. set during the turbulent years of the Heian period, featuring characters based on Japanese history and folklore. It is a retelling of the legends and folktales (otogizōshi) around Minamoto no Raikō (Minamoto no Yorimitsu) with his shitennō (Watanabe no Tsuna, Usui Sadamitsu, Urabe no Suetake, and Sakata no Kintoki), such as the legends of the Tsuchigumo, Kintarō, and Shuten Dōji, as well as their clash with the legendary onmyōji Abe no Seimei.
- The Heike Story is a 2021 anime by Science Saru adapting the Tale of the Heike, which is a dramatic account of the twilight years of the Heian period under the Taira clan's rule and the succeeding Genpei War. Unlike the epic, it is mainly told from the point-of-view of the members of the Taira clan as witnessed by a biwahōshi.
- Jujutsu Kaisen is a 2018 manga that features many references to the Heian period, which was considered the peak of jujutsu sorcery. Many characters—including the main antagonist, Ryomen Sukuna, as well as others such as Yorozu, Uro Takako, the Angel and Uraume—were born in the time period.
- Demon Slayer: Kimetsu no Yaiba is a 2016 manga. The main antagonist, Muzan Kibutsuji, was born during the Heian period and turned into the first and most powerful demon from an experimental treatment for his terminal illness.

Preceded by Nara period	Japanese history Heian period	Succeeded by Kamakura period
