= Sadamitsu (disambiguation) =

Sadamitsu may refer to:

== Places ==
- Sadamitsu, Tokushima, A former town in Tokushima, Japan. Now part of the town of Tsurugi, Tokushima
- Sadamitsu Station, A station in Tsurugi, Tokushima.

== People ==
- Suganuma Sadamitsu, A Japanese samurai from Sengoku Era.
- Usui Sadamitsu, A Japanese warrior from the Mid-Heian Period.

== Modern fictional characters ==
- Usui Sadamitsu, young female-warrior character in 2000s Otogizoshi (anime)
- Usui Sadamitsu, female-warrior character in Otogi 2: Immortal Warriors game

== Arts ==
- Sadamitsu the Destroyer, A manga series by Masahiko Nakahira.
