= Watanabe no Tsuna =

Japanese samurai

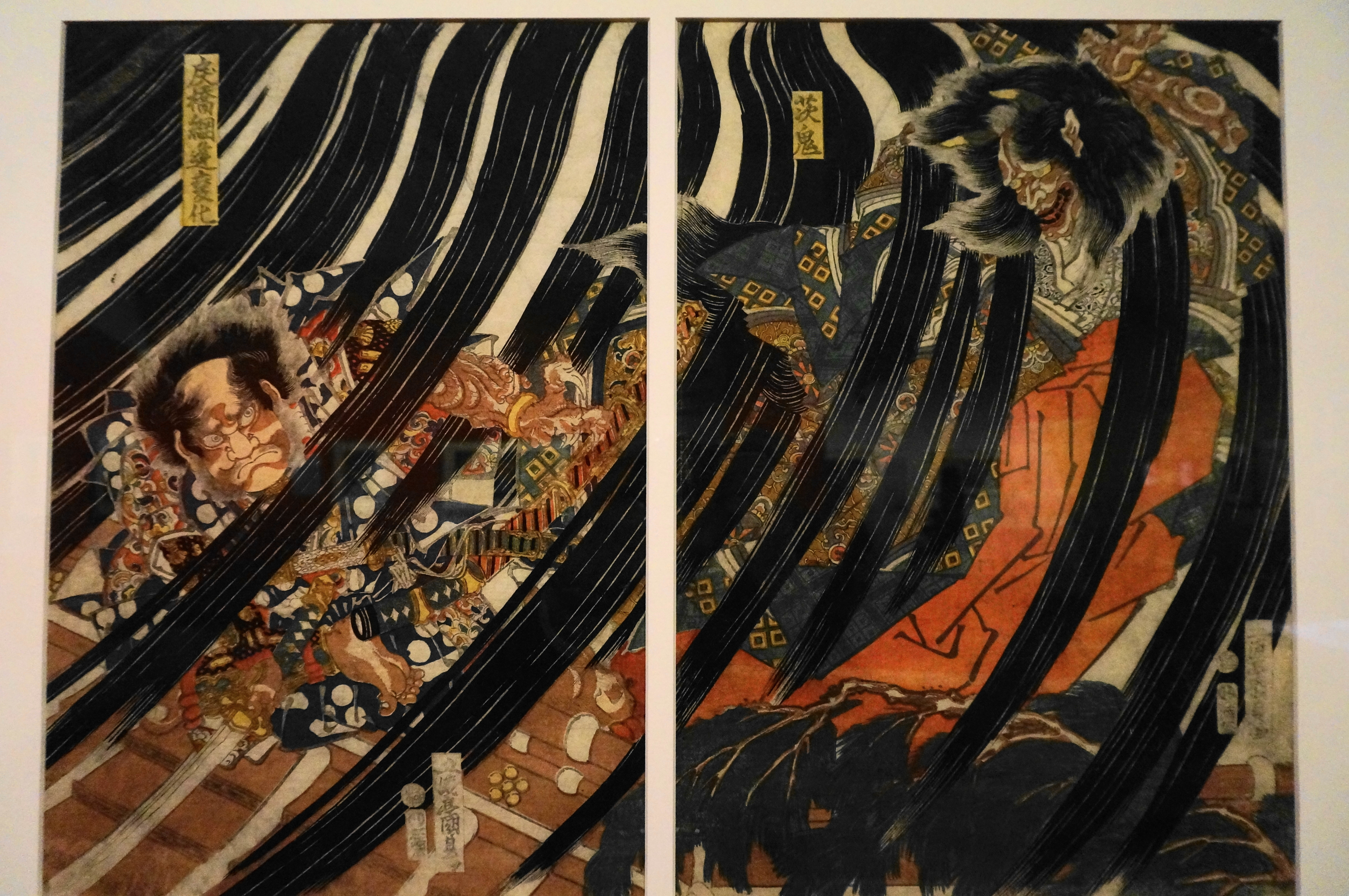
"Watanabe no Tsuna meets Ibaraki-dōji at Modoribashi Bridge." Ukiyo-e print by Utagawa Kunisada.

Watanabe no Tsuna (渡辺 綱; 953–1025) was a Japanese samurai of the Heian period and a companion in arms of Minamoto no Yorimitsu (also known as Raikō), one of the earliest samurai to be famed for his military exploits in a number of tales and legends.

Watanabe no Tsuna was the first person to take the surname Watanabe, and Watanabe is the fifth most common surname in Japan, with approximately 1.08 million people as of 2017.

Because Watanabe no Tsuna is believed to be a hero associated with the legend that he vanquished oni historically considered to be the strongest, such as Shuten-doji and Ibaraki-doji, there is a tradition that oni stay away from people named Watanabe and their houses. For this reason, some families with the surname Watanabe have not practiced the custom of throwing beans on Setsubun for generations.

== Origin ==
Watanabe no Tsuna was a samurai of the Saga Genji branch of the Minamoto clan, and his official name was Minamoto no Tsuna. He was the son of Minamoto no Atsuru (933-953) married to a daughter of Minamoto no Mitsunaka, grandson of Minamoto no Mototsuko (891-942), great-grandson of Minamoto no Noboru (848-918), and great-great-grandson of Minamoto no Tōru (822-895), son of the Emperor Saga (786-842), the 52nd Emperor of Japan. Tsuna established the Watanabe branch of the Minamoto clan, taking the name from his stronghold at Watanabe, in Settsu Province, and in 1020 he was appointed 'Tango no kami' (Governor of Tango Province). He was the stepgrandson of the Seiwa Genji and Chinjufu-shōgun Minamoto no Mitsunaka (912-997), and was companion in arms to his step uncle Minamoto no Yorimitsu (944–1021).

== In legend ==
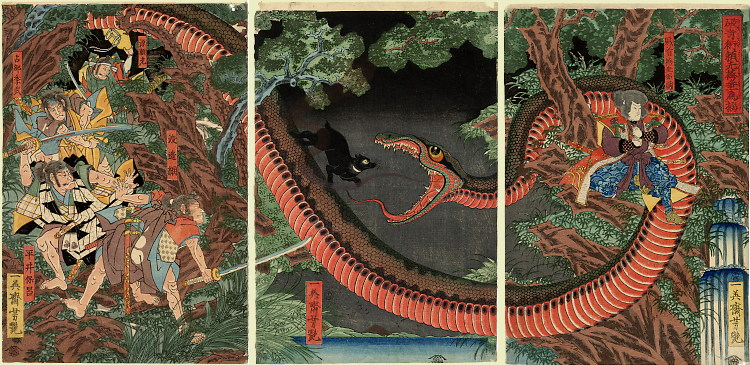
"A Strange Account of the Destruction of the Bandits by the Elite Four" (Watanabe no Tsuna, Minamoto no Yorimitsu, Urabe no Suetake, and Fujiwara no Yasumasa.), Yomihon book by Utagawa Toyokuni and Takizawa Bakin.

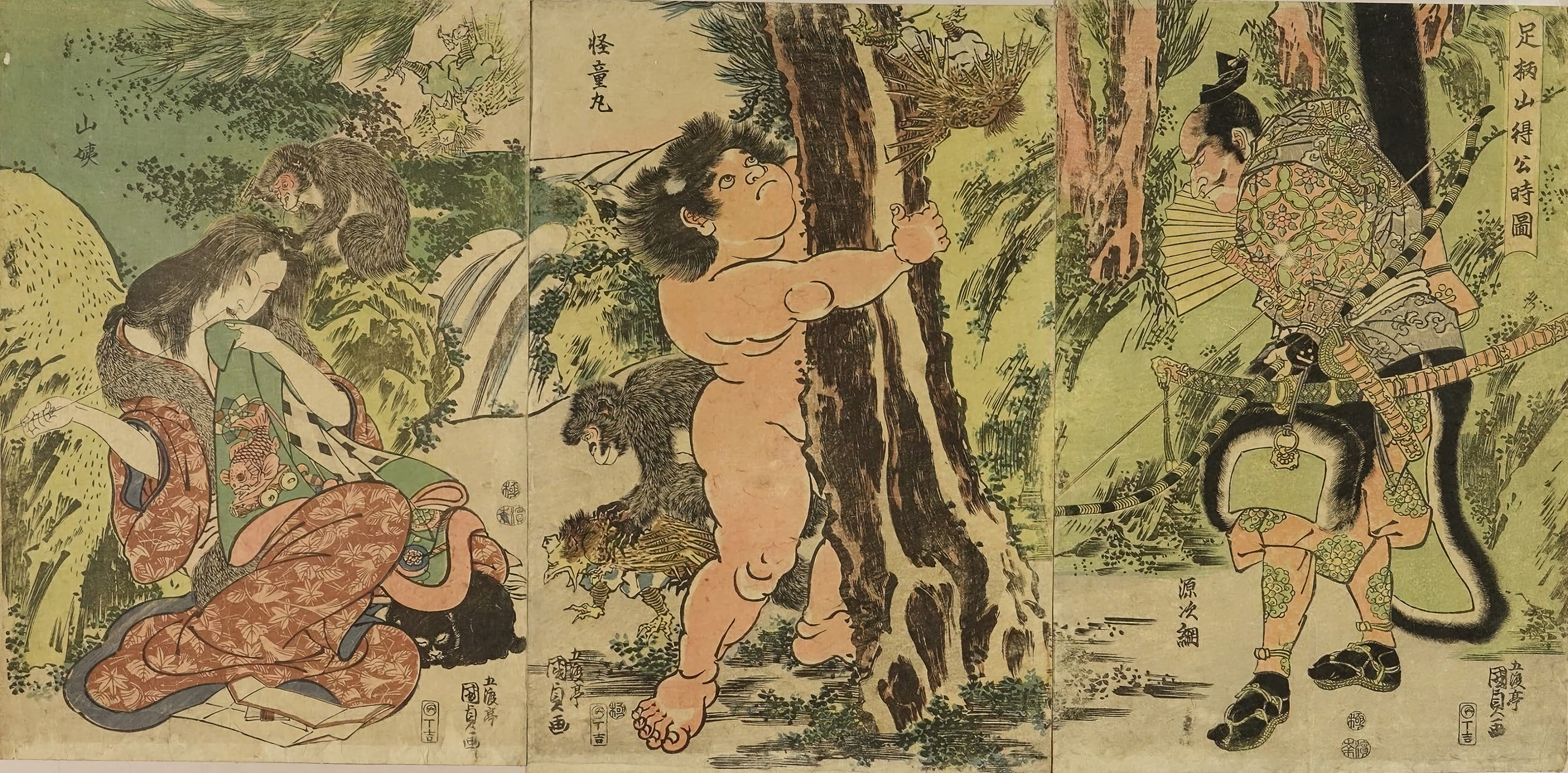
Yama-uba with Kintaro and Watanabe no Tsuna (Genji no Tsuna) in Mount Ashigara by Utagawa Kunisada, 1811

Tsuna features in many of Yorimitsu's legendary adventures, and aids him in fighting many monsters, beasts and demons.

In one such tale, Tsuna accompanies Raikō to the hut of Yamamba, a man-eating hag. There they find a boy known as Kintarō, who had been brought up among animals and endowed with superhuman strength. The boy requests that Raikō allow him to become one of his retainers, and Raikō accepts, giving the boy the name Sakata no Kintoki, often shortened to Kintoki.

Some of Watanabe no Tsuna's other comrades are Urabe no Suetake and Usui Sadamitsu. Together, the four are collectively known as the Four Guardian Kings, an allusion to the Buddhist Shitennō. Watanabe is also said to have assisted Raikō in slaying a tsuchigumo.

His most famous feat is the defeat of the oni Ibaraki-doji, the principal follower of Shuten-doji. He fought Ibaraki-doji single-handedly at the Rashomon gate at the southern end of Suzaku-oji, the central North-South street in the old capital Heian-kyō (now Kyoto). In the battle, Tsuna amputated Ibaraki-doji's arm with a tachi (Japanese long sword), nicknamed the 'Higekiri'. This sword was forged at the same time as the 'Hizamaru' used by Minamoto no Yorimitsu to repel tsuchigumo. At present, Kitano Tenmangū Shrine owns the tachi 'Onikirimaru' (Note: 'Onikirimaru' has the same name as the sword owned by Tada Shrine, but they are different swords.) which has been handed down as a 'Higekiri', and Daikaku-ji Temple, Hakone Shrine and an individual, own the tachi which has been handed down as a Hizamaru. 'Higekiri and Hizamaru' have other names based on various legends. 'Higekiri' is also called 'Onikiri ' ('Onikirimaru', 'Onimaru' (Note: 'Onimaru' has the same name as 'Onimaru' of Tenka-Goken, but they are different swords.)), 'Shishinoko' or 'Tomokiri', and 'Hizamaru' is also called 'Kumokiri', 'Hoemaru' or 'Usumidori'.

== Tsuna and the Ibaraki-doji ==
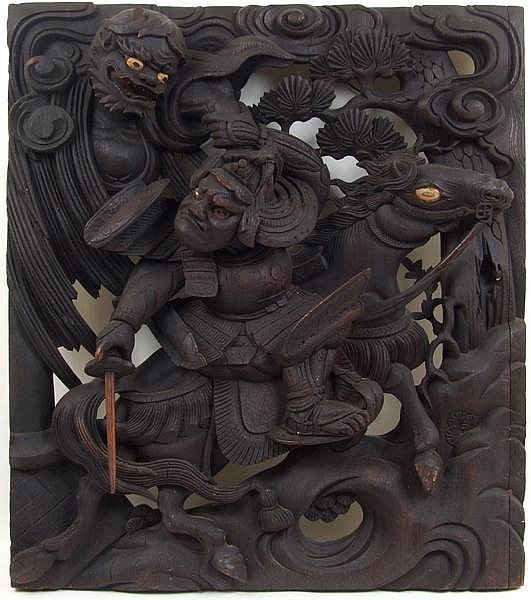
Watanabe no Tsuna fighting Ibaraki, mid Edo-period wood carving

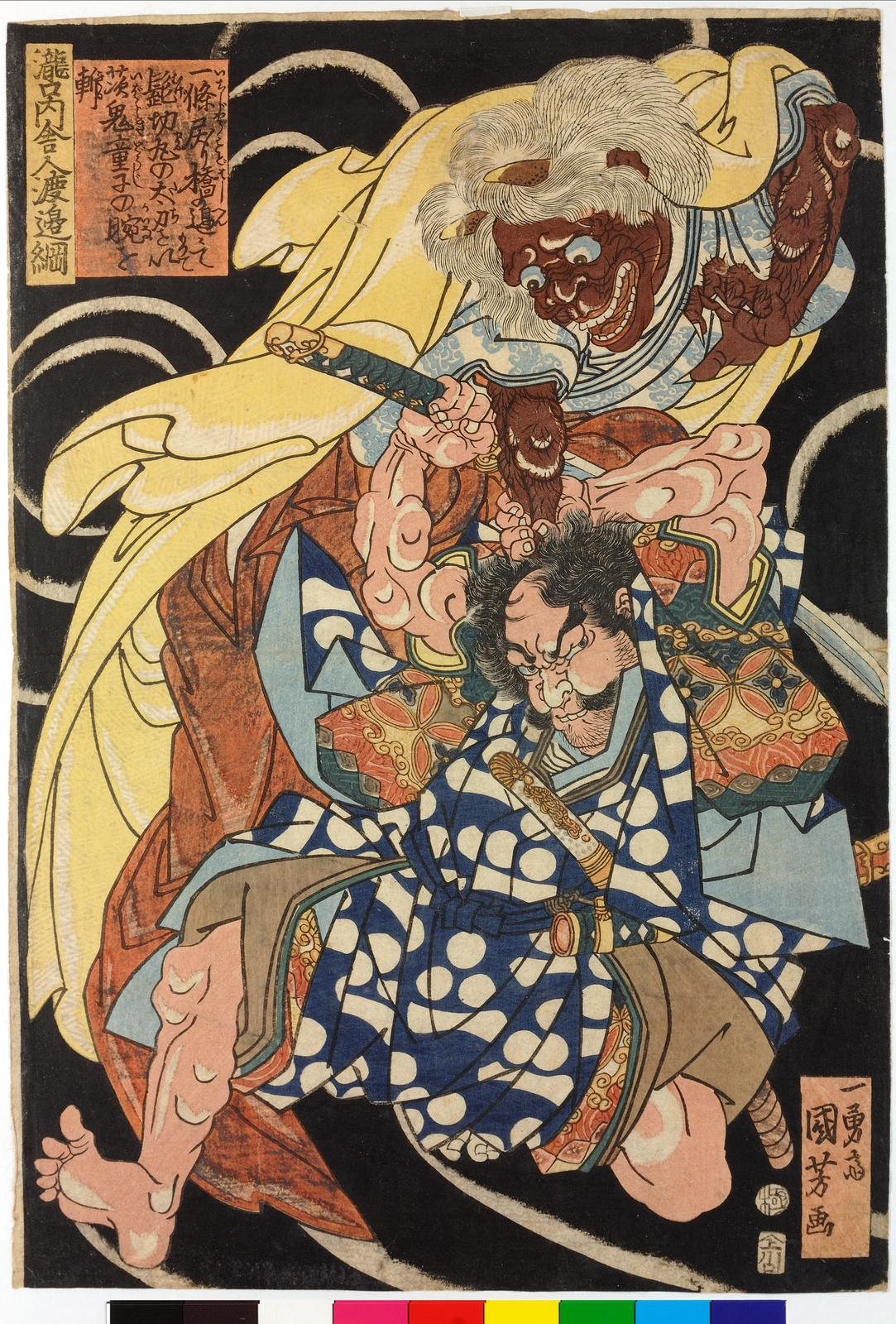
Watanabe no Tsuna fighting the oni Ibaraki, ukiyo-e print by Utagawa Kuniyoshi

According to legend in the late 10th century of Heian Period Japan, Ibaraki-doji, a notorious Oni, resided at Rashomon Gate in Kyoto. Ibaraki-doji harassed people who tried to pass through the gate until a heroic samurai named Watanabe no Tsuna, a loyal retainer of Minamoto no Raiko, went to subdue the creature. When Tsuna arrived at Rashomon Gate he was attacked by Ibaraki-doji. However, Tsuna was a strong and valiant swordsman who was able to defend himself against the ferocious attack. The battle raged on until Tsuna drew his katana and severed the arm of the demon. Screaming in pain Ibaraki-doji ran away from Tsuna, leaving the severed arm behind. Tsuna swept up Ibaraki-doji's arm as a trophy. When he arrived home at his mansion he wrapped up the severed arm and locked it away in a chest (唐櫃).

A few days later, an elderly woman claiming to be Tsuna's aunt, Mashiba, came to visit him. During the conversation, the aunt asked her nephew to recount how he fought with the oni, and when Tsuna mentioned that he had the severed arm in his possession, his aunt was curious and asked to see it. The unsuspecting Tsuna brought out the chest with Ibaraki-doji's arm inside and when he removed the arm, his aunt revealed herself as being Ibaraki-doji in disguise. She grabbed the arm and escaped from Tsuna's mansion. Tsuna was astonished that Ibaraki-doji had posed as his elderly aunt and did not give chase. However, even after retrieving the arm, Ibaraki-doji never returned to dwell at Rashomon Gate again.

== Tsuna and Hashihime ==
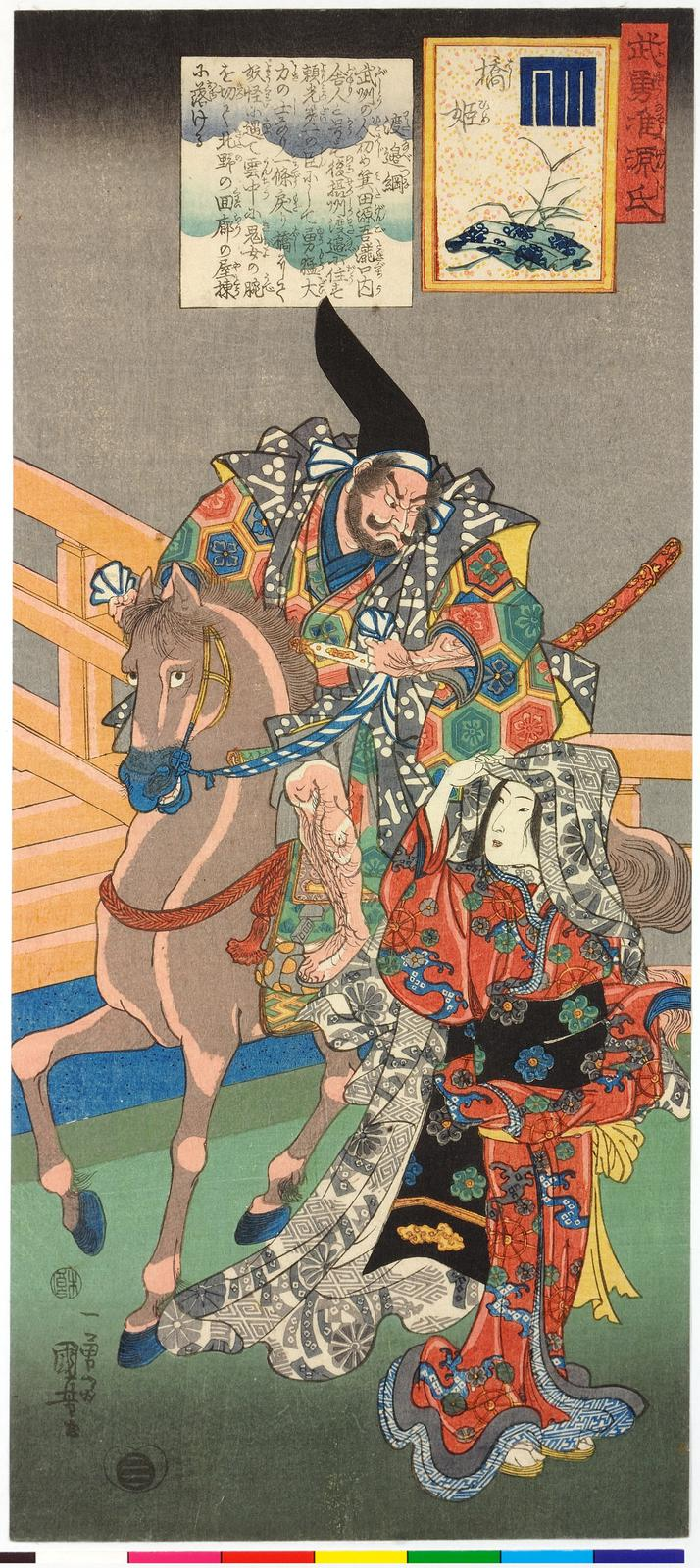
Watanabe no Tsuna, mounted, encounters the demon woman Hashihime at the Modari Bridge, Ichijo, Kyoto.)

The Kibune Shrine became strongly associated with the ox hour curse following the fame of the medieval legend of the Hashihime of Uji ("The Princess of the Bridge of Uji"). The legend is considered the prime source of the later conception Ushi no toki mairi curse ritual. According to legend, Hashihime in mortal life was the daughter of a certain nobleman, but consumed by jealousy, made a wish to become a kijin (an oni demon) capable of destroying her love rival. After 7 days at Kifune Shrine, she was finally given revelation by the resident deity "to bathe for thirty seven days in the rapids of the Uji River." Note that even though Kibune has later been seen as a mecca for the ritual, Hashihime only learned the recipe here, and enacted it miles away (Kifune is in the north of Kyoto, the Uji River is to the south).

The earliest written text of the legend occurs in a late Kamakura-period variant text (Yashirobon codex) of The Tale of Heike, under the Tsurugi no maki ("Book of the Sword") chapter. According to it, Hashihime was originally a mortal during the reign of Emperor Saga (809 to 823), but after turning demon and killing her rival, her man's kinsmen, then indiscriminately other innocent parties, she lived on beyond the normal human life span, to prey on the samurai Watanabe no Tsuna at the Ichijo Modoribashi (一条戻橋) "Turning Back bridge at the street crossing of Ichijō and Horikawa" bridge, only to have her arm severed by the sword Higekiri (髭切). Tsuna kept the demon's arm, whose power was contained by the Yinyang master (陰陽師, onmyōji) Abe no Seimei, via chanting the Ninnō-kyō sutra.

== Tsuna's Meitō, the Oni Slayer ==
Watanabe-no-Tsuna was armed with one of the most famous swords in early samurai History, a Tachi called Sun-Nashi (Missing Sun) of a length of 2 shaku & 7 sun (roughly 81,8 cm), forged by the great Munechika, with the help of Hachiman Daimyōjin, or so the legend says. One of the two earliest recorded swords used to perform Tameshigiri, it has changed nicknames and owners multiple times.

Among the nicknames of this sword were : Sun-Nashi, Tomokiri, Higekiri, Onikiri, Shishi no ko and Tomokiri (again).

Tomokiri (the Friend Slayer, or Equal Cutter), for having cut, by its own will, through the steel of another sword of great quality, Hizamaru, who had been made at the request of the Emperor of Japan, by a smith rival of Sun-Nashi's maker. Higekiri (beard cutter) was earned when the blade beheaded a criminal, the earliest Tameshigiri recorded, attempted in the hands of Minamoto no Mitsunaka (Raiko's father)... the victim had a long beard, who was cut smoothly along the neck. Onikiri (Oni Slayer), come from the incident of Ibaraki Dōji's severed arm. Shishi no ko (lion's cub) came from a legend where it made noise like a roaring lion at night, as if possessed by some Yōkai. And Tomokiri (again), after having by its own will (again), cut through a copy of its blade and shortened it in order to make it the same size. A similar story exist for Onimaru Kunitsuna, one of the Tenka Goken.

Heirloom of the Seiwa Genji bloodline of the Minamoto Clan, treasured and used in combat by famous heroes, such as Raiko, Tsuna, Minamoto no Yoshiie and his grandson Tameyoshi. It was Raiko who gave Higekiri to Watanabe-no-Tsuna, trusted friend and general. Latter it was inherited by Raiko's nephew and passed on in the Seiwa Genji family.

Onikiri is to be displayed at the Edo Tokyo Museum from November 23, 2016 to January 29, 2017.

== In popular culture ==
- The 1985 historical fantasy novel Teito Monogatari by folklore researcher Hiroshi Aramata features a climactic scene which is a direct homage to Watanabe no Tsuna's encounter at Modoribashi bridge. In the story, Meiji era writer Koda Rohan makes a dash to stop the oni Yasunori Kato from flying away with an innocent young maiden. He grabs Kato by the legs, but is lifted up into the air with him. Desperate to free himself, Rohan slashes at Kato with his short sword and drops to the ground holding Kato's severed arm. In the first film adaptation of the novel, there is a scene at the beginning where an artist at a local festival is describing the story of Watanabe no Tsuna to an audience, foreshadowing Koda's encounter with Kato. Also in the corresponding scene of this adaptation, before Kato disappears into the air, his face turns into a demonic countenance revealing his true nature.
- Watanabe no Tsuna, is a character in the anime Otogi Zoshi. Minor historical error, Tsuna's sword his already nicknamed Onikiri way before his encounter with Ibaraki Dōji.
- He is a character in the anime Kai Doh Maru, where he fights the albino warrior Ibaragi, a lieutenant of the sorcerer known as Shuten Doji. In their first fight he cuts off Ibaragi's right arm; in the second, Ibaragi – who shouts he's come to take back his arm – cuts off Tsuna's right arm and would have beheaded him had he not been mortally shot by Minamoto no Raiko; he has life enough left to detonate himself before dying, killing Tsuna in the process.
- Watanabe, along with Raikō, Usui Sadamitsu, Sakata no Kintoki, Urabe no Suetake, Abe no Seimei, and several other well known figures in Japanese history, is featured in the Xbox video game, Otogi 2: Immortal Warriors. In the game, he has a wolf-like appearance and wields a dual-sided curved sword.
- The main character of Ogre Slayer, a manga by Kei Kusunoki, is believed to be Watanabe no Tsuna.
- He is a summonable character in the popular mobile game, Fate/Grand Order as a Saber Class Servant.
- He appears in the video game Nioh 2 as a close friend to Raiko.
- He appears in the 2021 yokai film The Great Yokai War: Guardians as the ancestor of the main human protagonist, Kei Watanabe.

== In netsuke ==
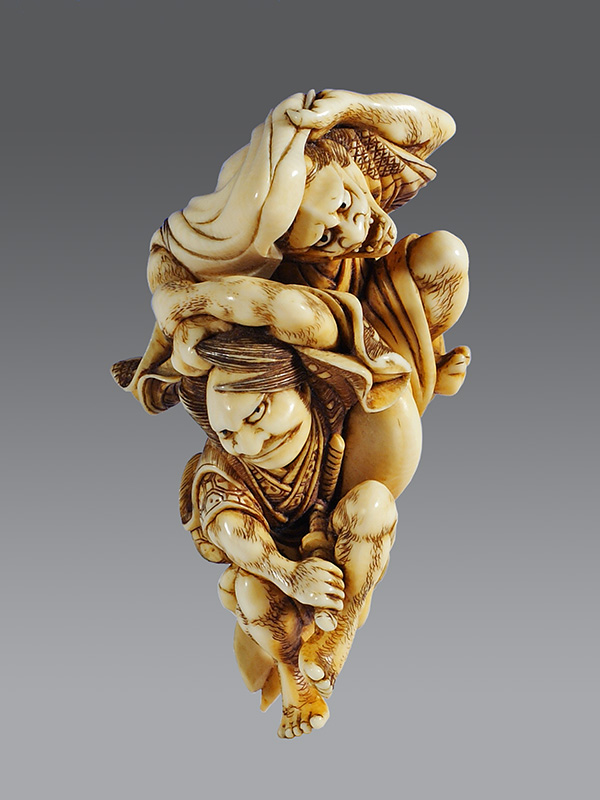
Watanabe no Tsuna and Demon of Rashomon, carver Otoman, circa 1830, ivory, height 72 mm

Exciting myth about Watanabe no Tsuna was perpetuated not only in written works, but in art and sculpture. The image of Watanabe no Tsuna taking his sword to beat demon's attack off became iconographical.

There is the netsuke, made of famous carver of the 19th century Otoman – Watanabe no Tsuna and Demon of Rashomon. This work is based on a little-known legend about the struggle of the famous samurai with a demon that turned into a young girl.

One day the chief sent samurai Watanabe no Tsuna to a village with a task. Upon fulfilling the task, Tsuna decided to return to the city as soon as possible. It was already getting dark when he approached the bridge and saw a pretty girl who asked the gallant samurai to take her home at such a late hour. He put the girl on his back and was about to move on. Suddenly the girl became a terrible devil, who grabbed Tsuna's hair and whispered: 'My house is located on Mount Atago'. The Samurai did not lose his courage, he quickly drew his sword and cut off the devil's paw. The monster disappeared in the darkness, wailing. Tsuna picked up the trophy, but lost it on his way back home.

The carver skillfully reflected this subject in presented netsuke. The sudden devil's attack did not take the brave warrior unexpected. With his one hand he is firmly holding the devil's wrist, and with the other hand he is pulling his sword from its sheath. The temptress's face and body has changed beyond recognition, and only flirtatious gesture-holding to the edge of the cloak-speaks about its feminine essence.

The presented work features the master's signature with a kakihan. In 1983, German collector Klauss Reiss purchased this item as an okimono for 2,500 Deutsche Marks in an antique shop in Munich. The seller stated that he had exchanged it for bronze Japanese statues. Upon returning home, Reiss found that the base of the okimono could be separated from the figure. After removing it, he found a himotoshi and Otomon's signature.

When another collector Barry Davis saw this netsuke he proposed Klauss a good sum of money. The sum of the deal is not disclosed. Later the figure changed its owners several times before it got to the Ukrainian collector Borys Filatov. As of 2009 this work is the most expensive netsuke at world antique market.

== See also ==
- Tsuchigumo Sōshi
- Rashōmon no oni
- Rashōmon (otogi-zōshi)
- Kidōmaru
- Heike Tsuruginomaki

== Sources ==
- Kato, Eileen (1970). "The Iron Crown (Kanawa)". In Keene, Donald (ed.). Twenty Plays of the Nō Theatre. Columbia University Press. pp. 193–194ff. ISBN 9780231034555.
- 三橋, 健 [in Japanese] (2011). 決定版知れば知るほど面白い！ 神道の本 [The definitive book on Shintoism: The more you learn, the more interesting it becomes!]. 西東社. pp. 264–5. ISBN 978-4791618163.
