= Usui Sadamitsu (disambiguation) =

Usui Sadamitsu is a legendary male or female warrior of the mid-Heian period of Japanese history.

Usui Sadamitsu may also refer to modern fictional characters:

- Usui Sadamitsu, a young male warrior character in the 2004–05 Otogi Zoshi (anime) television series
- Usui Sadamitsu, a female warrior character in the 2003 Otogi 2: Immortal Warriors hack and slash action game
