= Hikaru Hanada =

Japanese voice actor and actor (born 1958)

- 花田 光
- Born: Mitsuo Hanada; September 12, 1958 (age 68); Nakatsugawa, Gifu Prefecture, Japan
- Occupations: Voice actor, actor
- Agent: Office Osawa
- Children: 1

Hikaru Hanada (花田 光, Hanada Hikaru; born September 12, 1958 in Gifu) is a Japanese voice actor and actor, who is affiliated with Office Osawa. He is known for roles such as Usami Akihiko in Junjou Romantica.

== Filmography ==
=== Anime television ===
- Doraemon (1979 anime) (1999) (Buffalo, Caster)
- Mobile Suit Gundam Seed Destiny (2004) (Captain Baba in ep. 15,27-28)
- Doraemon (2005 anime) (2011) (Sommelier)

Unknown date

- Armitage: Dual-Matrix (2002) (Ross Sylibus)
- Bleach (2008) (Beast Sword; Kuzu Ryuu)
- Detective Conan (1999) (Nishimura)
- Ergo Proxy (Raul Creed)
- Guilty Gear X Drama CD (Sol Badguy)
- Guilty Gear XX Drama CD: Side Red/Black (Sol Badguy)
- Inuyasha (Ghost in ep. 97)
- Izumo: Takeki Tsurugi no Senki (Oonamuji)
- Junjou Romantica (2008) (Akihiko Usami)
- Kai Doh Maru (Sadamitsu Usuino)
- Kaikan Phrase (Director in ep.25; Live house owner in ep 8–9; Manager in ep. 19, 30, 38)
- Kotencotenco (Daimaoh, Golem, Monster, Turtle)
- Master Mosquiton '99 (Gentleman in ep. 16)
- Miscast Series Drama CDs (Shinichi Makimura)
- Monochrome Factor (Naitou in ep. 17)
- One Piece (Maynard)
- Outlaw Star (Prisoner in ep. 22)
- Samurai Shodown: Warriors Rage (Jin-emon Hanafusa)
- Sekai-ichi Hatsukoi (Akihiko Usami in ep. 6 season 2)
- Sexy Commando Gaiden: Sugoiyo! Masaru-san (Umaibou, Hattori)
- Shinkyoku Sōkai Polyphonica (Partesio Yugiri in ep. 8)
- Shinseikiden Mars (Professor Yokoyama)
- Strawberry Eggs (Seiko's Father)
- Summer (Master)
- Those Who Hunt Elves (Karei Pirate in ep. 1)
- You're Under Arrest (Bomb Squad Agent B in ep. 30; Voice on Tape in ep. 34)

=== Animated films ===
- Harmony (2015)
- One Piece: Stampede (2019) (Maynard)

=== Video games ===
- Garou: Mark of the Wolves (1999) (Marco Rodrigues, Tizoc)
- Samurai Shodown: Warriors Rage (1999) (Jin-emon Hanafusa)
- Guilty Gear X2 (2002) (Sol Badguy "Story mode only")
- The King of Fighters 2003 (2003) (Tizoc)
- Otogi 2: Immortal Warriors (2003) (Raikou)
- The King of Fighters XI (2006) (Tizoc)
- The King of Fighters XIV (2016) (King of Dinosaurs)
- Pokémon Masters (2019) (Ghetsis)
- The King of Fighters XV (2022) (King of Dinosaurs)
- Fatal Fury: City of the Wolves (2025) (Tizoc)

=== Drama CDs ===
- Miscast series (Shinichi Makimura)
- Renai Shinan! (Takazuki Honjou)
- Tsukiyo ni Koisuru Touzoku-san (Raishiru)
- Junjou Romantica (Usami Akihiko)

=== Japanese dub ===
==== Live-action ====
- Arrow (Malcolm Merlyn / Dark Archer (John Barrowman))
- Babygirl (Jacob Mathis (Antonio Banderas))
- Das Experiment (Eckert (Timo Dierkes))
- Firewall (Liam (Nikolaj Coster-Waldau))
- Freaky (Mr. Bernardi (Alan Ruck))
- Grey's Anatomy (Dr. Tom Koracick (Greg Germann))
- Jack Reacher (Emerson (David Oyelowo))

==== Animation ====
- The Lego Batman Movie (Superman)
- The Lego Movie 2: The Second Part (Superman)
