= Rashōmon (otogi-zōshi) =

Rashōmon (羅生門) is a Japanese otogi-zōshi in two books, likely composed around the middle of the Muromachi period.

== Date, genre and sources ==
Rashōmon was probably composed around the middle of the Muromachi period.

It is a work of the otogi-zōshi genre in two books. It is one of a number of works depicting legendary encounters between Minamoto no Yorimitsu and Watanabe no Tsuna and some form of monster. Other such works include the Heike Tsurugi no Maki (平家剣巻), the Tadafuyu shōraku no koto tsuketari onimaru, onigiri no koto (直冬上洛事付鬼丸鬼切事) passage in Book XXXII of the Taiheiki, the otogi-zōshi Shuten-dōji and the yōkyoku (Noh libretti) Rashōmon and Ōe-yama. The work also incorporates legends of the swords Onimaru (鬼丸) and Onigiri (鬼切).

== Plot ==
Minamoto no Yorimitsu and his four generals, including Watanabe no Tsuna, and Fujiwara no Yasumasa defeat the demon of Ōe-yama. Later, one night at a banquet, Yasumasa tells of a servant of the Ōe-yama demon, Kidōji that is menacing passers by at the Rashōmon. Tsuna, expressing doubt, visits the Rashōmon to verify the rumour, and cuts off Kidōji's right arm with a tachi called Hizamaru (膝丸), but as he is returning with his prize the demon steals his arm back. Later, Yorimitsu falls ill. Hearing that his master's sickness will be cured if the demon who lives in the forest of Uda, Yamato Province, Tsuna heads out. He encounters an ushi-oni in the form of a beautiful woman, cuts off its hand with a tachi called Higekiri (鬚切), and carries it home.

On the advice of a fortune-teller, Yorimitsu places the hand in a red chest (朱の唐櫃 shu no karabitsu), placing the chest in a northwest-facing storehouse. He encloses it in a shimenawa and for seven days reads aloud the Humane King Sutra before it. On the sixth day, the ushi-oni appears before Yorimitsu in the form of the latter's mother, in order to steal back its hand, but Yorimitsu cuts it down with Higekiri.

The swords Hizamaru and Higekiri are dubbed, respectively, Onimaru and Onigiri and become prized family heirlooms of the Minamoto clan.

== Textual tradition ==
There are picture book copies under the title Rashōmon E-kotoba (羅生門絵詞) in the holdings of Toyo University, Kyoto National Museum and the Tenri Library, as well as one in the collection of Yutaka Shimizu. There is also a two-volume Nara-ehon edition in the Seikadō Bunko Art Museum.
