= Urabe no Suetake =

Japanese samurai

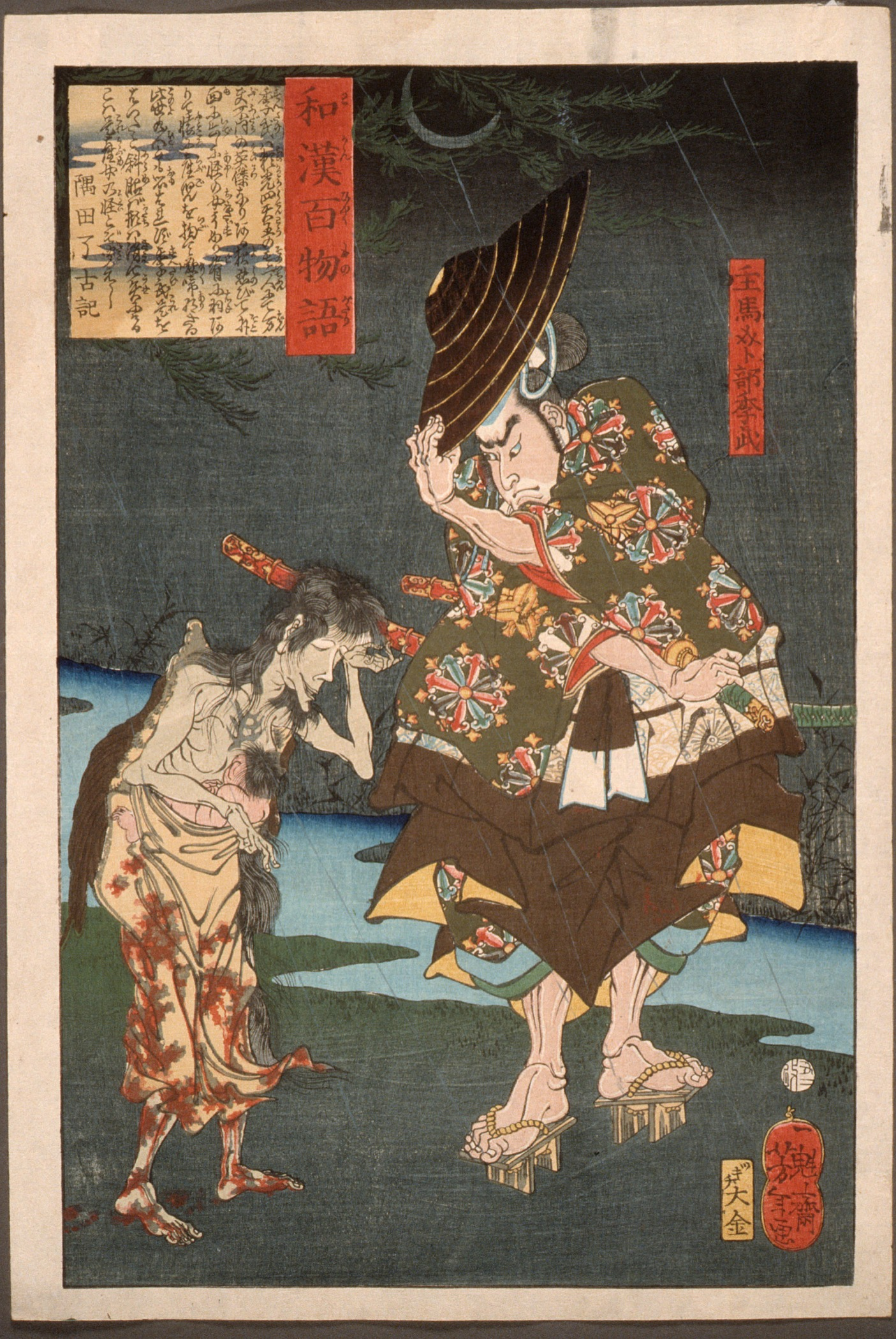
Suma Urabe Suetake meeting a Ubume with a child.

Urabe no Suetake (卜部 季武; 950 – 1022) was a samurai of the Heian period (794 – 1185) in the service of Minamoto no Yorimitsu (948 – 1021), a regent of the Fujiwara clan. Suetake was formally known as Taira no Suetake (平季武), and also appears in literature as Rokurō (六郎) and Kageyu (勘解由). Suetake assisted Yorimitsu throughout his life, being referred to as one of Shitennō, or "Four Guardian Kings" of Yorimitsu. Suetake originated from the House of Seiryū (Blue Dragon). In addition to Suetake, the other Shitennō of Yorimitsu were Usui Sadamitsu, Kintarō, and Watanabe no Tsuna. His ancestor is Sakanoue no Tamuramaro which he inherited his bow.

Suetake is the subject of a tale in the Konjaku Monogatarishū, a collection of folk legends compiled in the late Heian period. The Japanese tale in which Suetake appears is known as Ōeyama. He died in 1022 at the age of 73.

On a dark night, Taira no Suetake was crossing a river on horseback when he came across a Ubume holding a child in the middle of the river, who handed him a baby and said, "Hold this." Suetake took the baby and headed for the shore. The Ubume chased after him, saying, "Give me back my child," but Suetake ignored her and went ashore. When he returned to the mansion, he found that the baby had turned into a leaf.

== In popular culture ==
- Urabe no Suetake appears in the anime Otogi Zoshi as a woman aiding Minamoto no Raikou in his mission.
