= Manga Force: The Ultimate Collection =

UK magazine

Manga Force - The Ultimate Collection
- The Manga Force logo
- Editor: None credited
- Categories: Anime
- Frequency: Fortnightly
- Publisher: Manga Entertainment
- Founded: 2006
- Final issue: 2010
- Country: United Kingdom
- Language: English
- Website: http://www.mangacollection.co.uk
- ISSN: 1469-459X

Manga Force: The Ultimate Collection was a UK-based anime magazine published by Hachette Partworks in association with Manga Entertainment Ltd. It was available in several markets such as Ireland, Australia, New Zealand, South Africa, Malta, Malaysia, and Singapore and was distributed by Marketforce in the United Kingdom. Produced by Creative Plus Publishing Ltd, the magazine mistakenly refers to anime as manga, which is common for a Manga Entertainment publication, and can lead to confusion to those initially discovering Japanese animation.

It was released fortnightly at £8.99 (€14.99) and came free with the DVD that was described in the magazine. The average Manga Entertainment DVD title sells for around £12.99 without the magazine.

Although the publication was initially supposed to run to fifty published issues it was first extended to seventy-one issues, then to eighty-six issues (according to a Customer Care Consultant for the mangaforce magazine), finally ending its run at issue 102, which featured a live action movie.

The first issue was published in late 2006, but not available to purchase until early 2007. It came at a special introductory price of £2.99, as opposed to the regular price of £8.99.

== Issues ==
1. Ghost In The Shell
2. Blood: The Last Vampire (includes issue 3 free)
3. Macross Plus Episodes I–II (free with issue 2)
4. Akira
5. Neon Genesis Evangelion: Death & Rebirth
6. Ninja Scroll
7. Macross Plus Episodes III–IV
8. Neon Genesis Evangelion: The End Of Evangelion
9. (Listed on the DVD and magazine as being Street Fighter Alpha: The Movie, but the disc mistakenly included Street Fighter Alpha: Generations instead.)
10. Heat Guy J Episodes 1–4
11. Macross Plus The Movie
12. Tokyo Underground (listed on the case and in the magazine as being Episodes 1–4, in fact the DVD also featured episode 5)
13. Appleseed
14. Heat Guy J Episodes 5–8
15. Dead Leaves
16. Tokyo Underground Episodes 6–9
17. Perfect Blue
18. Heat Guy J Episodes 9–13
19. Tokyo Underground Episodes 10-14 (includes issue 20 free)
20. Street Fighter Alpha: Generations (free with issue 19)
21. X
22. Heat Guy J Episodes 14-17
23. Virus: Virus Buster Serge Volume 1
24. Tokyo Underground Episodes 15–18
25. Black Jack
26. Virus: Virus Buster Serge Volume 2
27. Heat Guy J Episodes 18–22
28. Vampire Wars
29. Tokyo Underground Episodes 18–22
30. Virus: Virus Buster Serge Volume 3
31. Orguss 2 Episodes 1–3
32. Psychic Wars
33. Heat Guy J Episodes 23–26
34. Orguss 2 Episodes 4–6
35. Tokyo Underground Episodes 23–26
36. Street Fighter II: The Animated Movie
37. Bubblegum Crash
38. Sword For Truth
39. She, the Ultimate Weapon Volume 1
40. Armageddon
41. Submarine 707 Revolution Mission: 01 & 02
42. R.O.D: Read or Die
43. She, the Ultimate Weapon Volume 2
44. Kai Doh Maru
45. Golgo 13: The Professional Special Agent Edition
46. She, the Ultimate Weapon Volume 3
47. Casshan: Robot Hunter
48. Urotsukidōji: Legend of the Overfiend
49. Urotsukidōji: Legend of the Demon Womb
50. Millennium Actress
51. Otogi Zoshi Volume 1
52. Ghost In The Shell 2: Innocence
53. Tactics Volume 1
54. Otogi Zoshi Volume 2
55. Tokko Volume 1
56. Tactics Volume 2
57. Noein: To Your Other Self Volume 1
58. Tokko Volume 2
59. Noein: To Your Other Self Volume 2
60. Otogi Zoshi Volume 3
61. Tactics Volume 3
62. Tokko Volume 3
63. Noein: To Your Other Self Volume 3
64. Otogi Zoshi Volume 4
65. Tactics Volume 4
66. Noein: To Your Other Self Volume 4
67. Otogi Zoshi Volume 5
68. Tactics Volume 5
69. Otogi Zoshi Volume 6
70. Noein: To Your Other Self Volume 5
71. Tactics Volume 6
72. Ghost In The Shell S.A.C Solid State Society
73. Highlander: The Search for Vengeance
74. Karas: The Prophecy
75. Hellsing: Ultimate Volume 1
76. Ghost In The Shell S.A.C Individual Eleven
77. Lupin the Third: The Secret of Mamo
78. Karas: The Revelation
79. Hellsing: Ultimate Volume 2
80. Ghost In The Shell S.A.C The Laughing Man
81. Origin: Spirits of the Past
82. Space Adventure Cobra
83. Hellsing: Ultimate Volume 3
84. Strait Jacket
85. Astroboy: Greatest Astro Adventures
86. Hellsing: Ultimate Volume 4
87. Afro Samurai Director's Cut
88. Dead Space: Downfall
89. Naruto the Movie: Ninja Clash in the Land of Snow
90. Afro Samurai Resurrection
91. Black Blood Brothers Chapter 1: Bad Tidings
92. Shigurui Volume 1
93. Baldr Force Exe
94. Black Blood Brothers Chapter 2: Emergence
95. Shigurui Volume 2
96. Jyu-Oh-Sei Volume 1
97. Black Blood Brothers Chapter 3: Resurrection
98. Negima!? Spring & Summer Specials
99. Jyu-Oh-Sei Volume 2
100. Naruto the Movie 2: Legend of the Stone of Gelel
101. Danté's Inferno: An Animated Epic
102. Ichi

== Subscription offers ==
The publishers offered a number of free gifts for those who subscribed to the collection rather than purchasing each issue from their newsagent. Subscription packages were only made available for residents of the United Kingdom, Australia, and South Africa. Subscribers would receive two issues of Manga Force on a monthly basis (as opposed to one issue fortnightly, two issues instead around every four or so weeks), and postage and packaging would be free. However, only subscribers from issues 1, 2 & 3, 4 or 5 were entitled to free gifts.

With the first delivery, subscribers received a Manga Force T-shirt and a free promotional poster for Akira with this delivery. The poster was initially for 'early bird' subscribers (who sent orders away within seven days) but was extended to all subscribers later.

Depending on when a subscription was taken out, some subscribers would receive some issues for free with their first delivery. If taken from issue 1, issues 1 & 3 were free. If from issue 2, issues 3 & 4 were for free. If from issue 4, issue 5 was for free. If from issue 5, issue 6 was for free. Subscribers could not take out a subscription from issue 3 as it was packaged along with issue 2 as a bundle.

With the second delivery, subscribers received a Ghost in the Shell: Stand Alone Complex (Episodes 1-4) DVD with their delivery. Many subscribers received a letter of apology stating that due to high demand, the DVD was unavailable until more were produced. Subscribers received this free gift in the third delivery.

With the third delivery, subscribers received a Manga Force branded watch and T-shirt along with their delivery.

With the fourth delivery, subscribers received an Akira: Production Report DVD, a behind the scenes look at the Akira film. This was the final free gift as part of the subscription package. After this, subscribers simply received two further issues with each delivery.

As part of the subscription, subscribers automatically received binders for the magazines, each costing £3.99 (€7.50) each. The first binder was given out with issues 11 and 12, with three binders in total sent so far. Subscribers were also told they may receive special issues that the publishers produced, but none have yet to be made or sent.

Issues 48, 49, and 50 were packaged together at full cost (not one being free like the issues two and three package).

== Street Fighter error ==
An error was made with issue 9, which mistakenly instead of giving Street Fighter Alpha: The Movie, gave the Street Fighter Alpha: Generations OVA instead.

This was partially fixed through the subscription package of issues 11 and 12, where the correct Street Fighter Alpha movie was included in issue 12. There was no given explanation for the error or an apology for the mistake, and the DVD was given in a simple white packet, unlike the regular DVD packaging the DVDs were given in.

It was not until the subscription package of issues 15 and 16 that an official letter of apology was sent in regards to this error.
