= Kai Doh Maru =

2001 original video animation (OVA)

怪童丸 (Kaidōmaru)
- Created by: IG Plus
- Original video animation
- Directed by: Kanji Wakabayashi
- Produced by: Katsuji Morishita
- Written by: Kanji Wakabayashi; Nobutoshi Terado
- Music by: Yoshihiro Ike
- Studio: Production I.G; IG Plus
- Licensed by: AUS: Madman Entertainment; NA: Manga Entertainment
- Released: December 19, 2001
- Runtime: 47 minutes

Kai Doh Maru (怪童丸, Kaidōmaru) is an original video animation (OVA) anime directed by Kanji Wakabayashi and produced by Production I.G. and SME Visual Works. It was released on December 19, 2001, in Japan and on July 29, 2003, in the United States by Manga Entertainment. In Australia, it is distributed on DVD by Madman Entertainment.

== Plot ==
Set in the Shōryaku and Chōtoku eras of Japan's Heian period, Kai Doh Maru is set against a background of a capital under threat from disease, outlaws, and political plots. The story reworks themes from Japanese folklore, focusing on the relationship between Sakata no Kintoki (Kintarō) and Minamoto no Raikō, one of the first military Minamoto and "monster hunters" of folklore. The story replaces the traditional image of Kintaro - a strong, ruddy-cheeked man - with that of a determined, tomboyish girl, while retaining much of the traditional character such as the carrying of an axe. Other historical figures from the period who have also become objects of folklore, such as Fujiwara no Michinaga and the rebel Taira no Masakado also make an appearance.

The story begins at Mount Ashigara in Sagami Province in the Shōryakuera, where the young Kintoki is caught in a bloody family feud. Disguised as a boy by her father to protect her from her uncle's ambitions to take over the family, Kintoki's memories of her childhood indicate that she was intended as the next head of the family. She is almost killed by her uncle when he kills her family in a coup, but is rescued by the arrival of the warrior Minamoto no Raikō, who takes her back to the capital.

There she grows up and joins Raikō's band of warriors, known as the "Four Heavenly Kings" Shitennō, and grows very close to Raikō, though their apparent feelings for each other remain undeclared. Five years later (in Chōtoku 1) she joins Raikō and his associates in policing the capital during a period of unrest caused by an outbreak of disease and bandits from Oeyama. Unbeknownst to Kintoki, the bandit leader Shuten Dōji is in fact her cousin, Ohni-hime. Ohni-hime is unaware that Kintoki is not a man, and has come to Heian-kyō to "rescue" him. The Oeyama bandits are secretly acting in cooperation Fujiwara no Michinaga, who hopes to use the chaos they cause to extend his control over the government. This results in the burning of the capital by Shuten Dōji and her follower Taira no Masakado. In the fighting, several of Raikō's associates are killed and Kintoki is abducted by Ohni-hime, forcing Raikō to seek her out in the bandit's Oeyama lair.
