= Kintarō =

Japanese folk hero

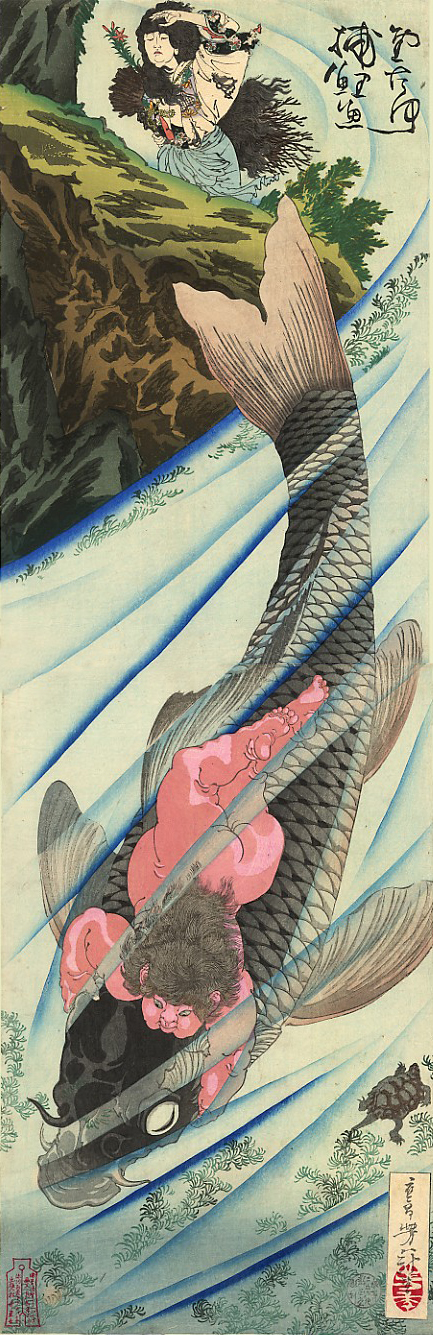
A young Kintarō battling Namazu, in a print by Yoshitoshi

Kintarō (金太郎; often translated as "Golden Boy") is a folk hero from Japanese folklore. A child of superhuman strength, he was raised by a yama-uba ("mountain witch") on Mount Ashigara. He became friendly with the animals of the mountain, and later, after catching Shuten-dōji, the terror of the region around Mount Ōe, he became a loyal follower of Minamoto no Yorimitsu under the new name Sakata no Kintoki (坂田 金時). He is a popular figure in Bunraku and kabuki drama, and it is a custom to put up a Kintarō doll on Boy's Day in the hope that boys will become equally brave and strong.

Kintarō is supposedly based on a real person, Sakata Kintoki, who lived during the Heian period and probably came from what is now the city of Minamiashigara, Kanagawa. He served as a retainer for the samurai Minamoto no Yorimitsu and became well known for his abilities as a warrior. As with many larger-than-life individuals, his legend has grown with time.

== Legend ==
Several competing stories tell of Kintarō's childhood.

In one, he was raised by his mother, Princess Yaegiri, daughter of a wealthy man named Shiman-chōja, in the village of Jizodo, near Mount Ashigara. In a competing legend, his mother gave birth to him in what is now Sakata, Yamagata. She was forced to flee, however, due to fighting between her husband, a samurai named Sakata, and his uncle. She finally settled in the forests of Mount Ashigara to raise her son. Alternatively, Kintarō's real mother left the child in the wilds or died and left him an orphan, and he was raised by a yama-uba or "mountain witch" (one tale says Kintarō's mother raised him in the wilds, but due to her haggard appearance, she came to be called yama-uba).

In the most fanciful version of the tale, the yama-uba was Kintarō's mother, impregnated by a clap of thunder sent from a red dragon of Mount Ashigara. According to some sources, this red dragon was Raijin.

The legends agree that even as a toddler, Kintarō was active and tireless, plump and ruddy, wearing only a haragake apron with the kanji for "gold" (金) on it. His only other belonging was a hatchet (ono or masakari). He was bossy to other children (or there simply were no other children in the forest), so his friends were mainly the animals of Mt. Kintoki and Mt. Ashigara. He was also phenomenally strong, able to smash rocks into pieces, uproot trees, and bend trunks like twigs. His animal friends served him as messengers and mounts, and some legends say that he even learned to speak their language. Several tales tell of Kintarō's adventures, fighting monsters and oni (demons), beating bears in sumo wrestling, and helping the local woodcutters fell trees.

As an adult, Kintarō changed his name to Sakata no Kintoki. He met the samurai Minamoto no Yorimitsu as he passed through the area around Mt. Kintoki. Yorimitsu was impressed by Kintarō's enormous strength, so he took him as one of his personal retainers to live with him in Kyoto. Kintoki studied martial arts there and eventually became the chief of Yorimitsu's Shitennō ("four braves"), renowned for his strength and martial prowess. He eventually went back for his mother and brought her to Kyoto as well.

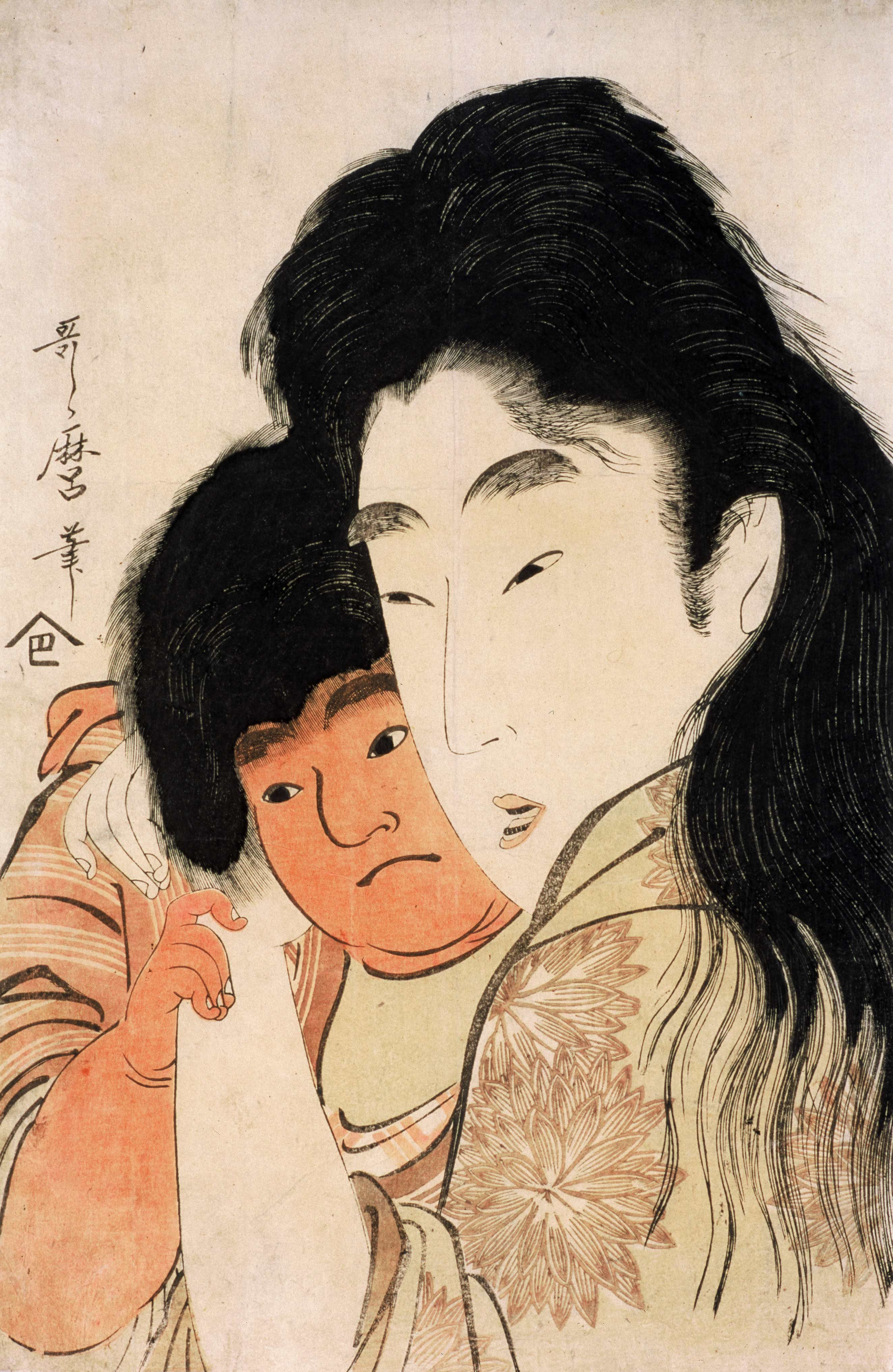
Yama-uba with Kintaro by Utamaro, 1796

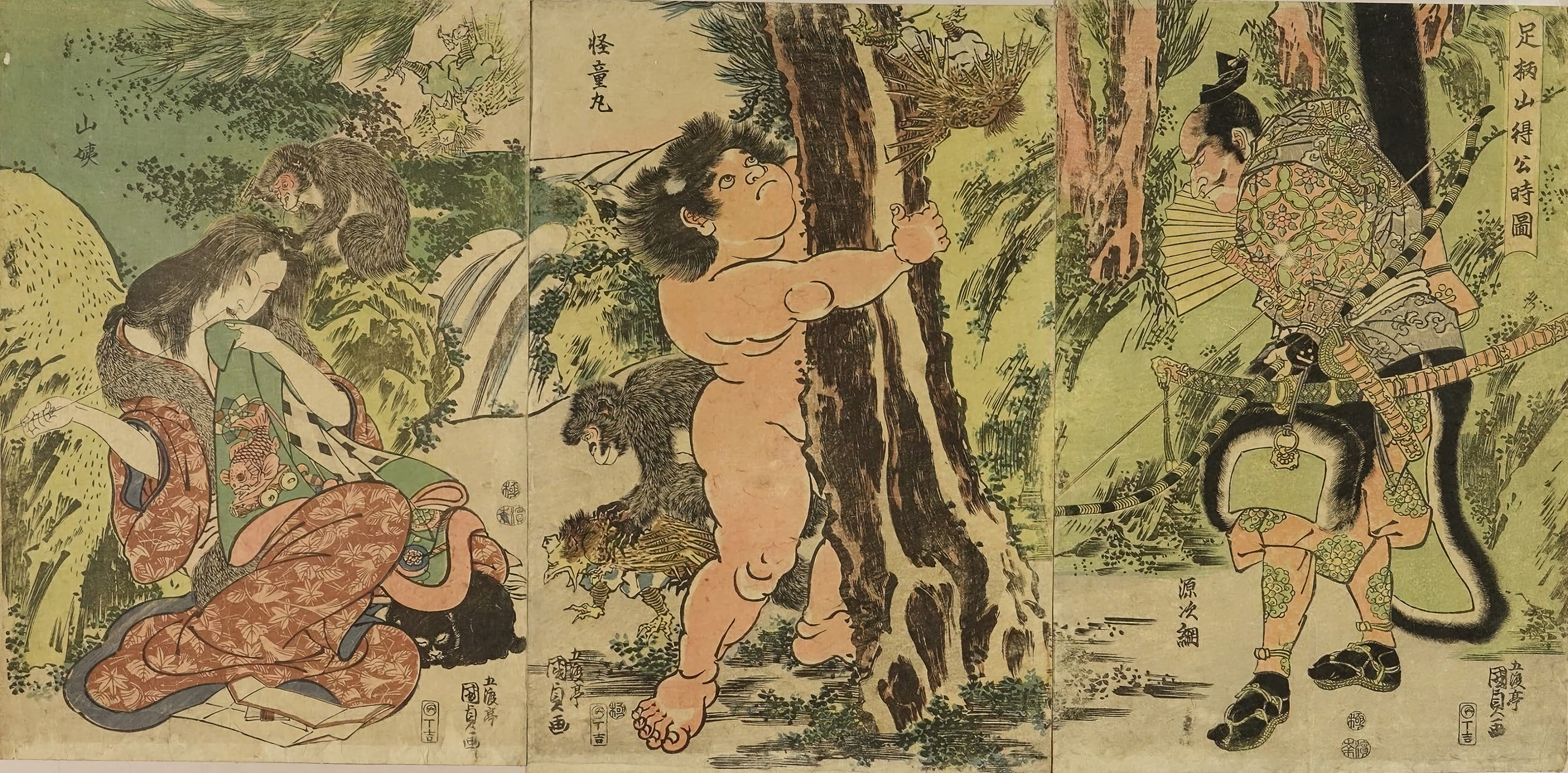
Yama-uba with Kintaro and a Watanabe no Tsuna (Genji no Tsuna) in Mount Ashigara by Utagawa Kunisada, 1811

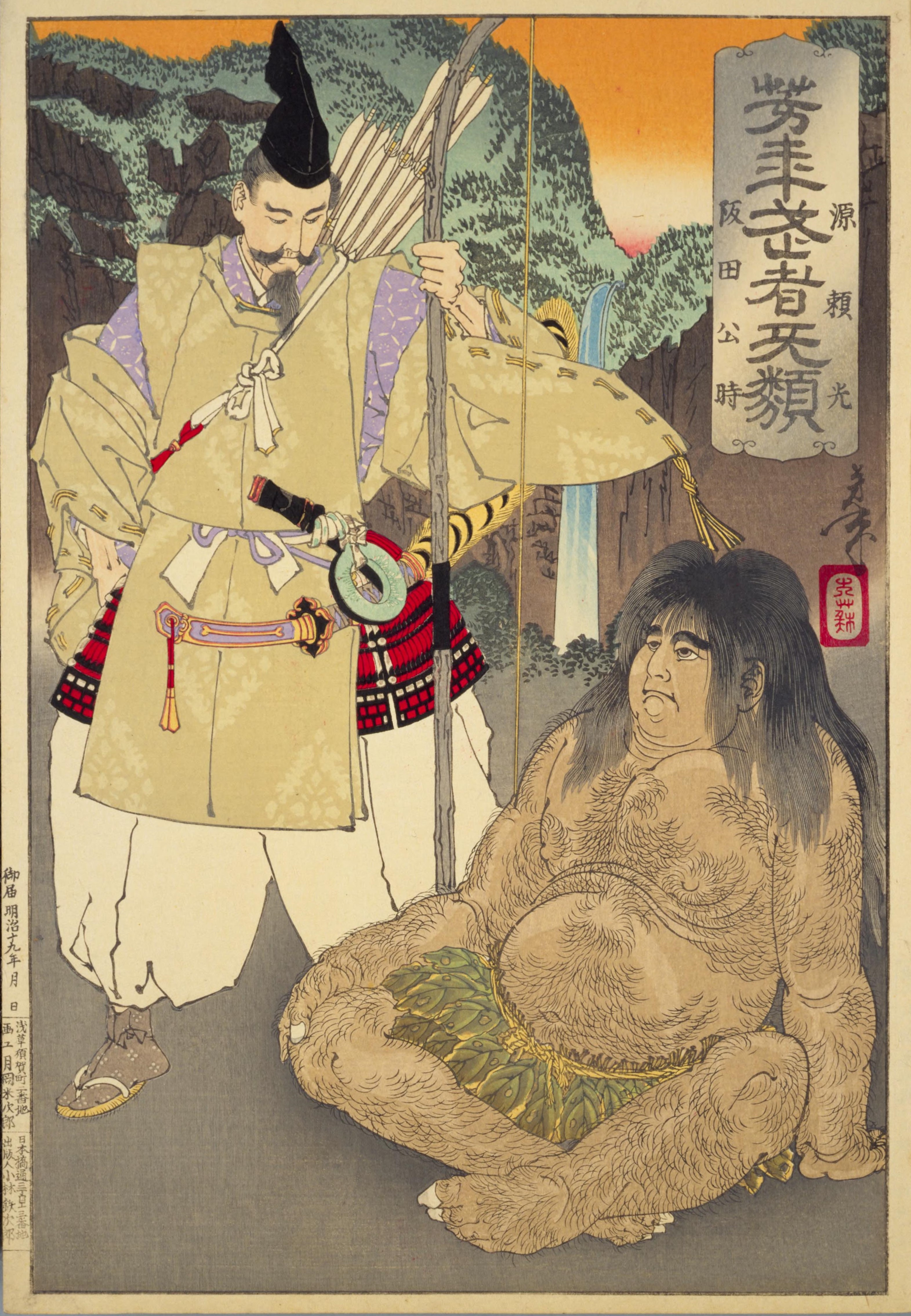
Minamoto no Yorimitsu and Kintarō by Yoshitoshi, 1886, Warriors Trembling with Courage

== In modern Japan ==
Kintarō is an extremely popular figure in Japan, and his image adorns everything from statues to storybooks, anime, manga to action figures. For example, the manga and anime Golden Boy stars a character with the same name. Kintarō as an image is characterized with an ono, a haragake apron, and sometimes a tame bear. In many of Kintarō's pictures, it seems that he is trying to capture a giant black koi. This seems to glorify his strength as he is able to wrestle with such a creature.

Kintarō candy has been around since the Edo period; no matter how the cylinder-shaped candy is cut, Kintarō's face appears inside. Japanese tradition is to decorate the room of a newborn baby boy with Kintarō dolls on Children's Day (May 5) so that the child will grow up to be strong like the Golden Boy. A shrine dedicated to the folk hero lies at the foot of Mount Ashigara in the Hakone area near Tokyo. Nearby is a giant boulder that was supposedly chopped in half by the boy hero himself.

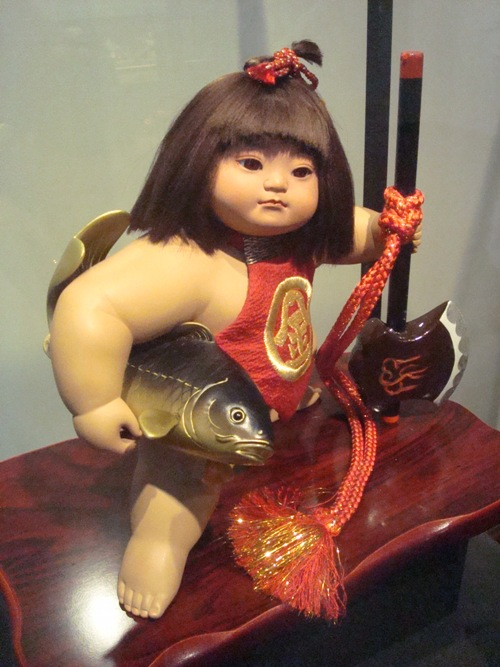
Kintarō holding a carp and an axe (Masakari)

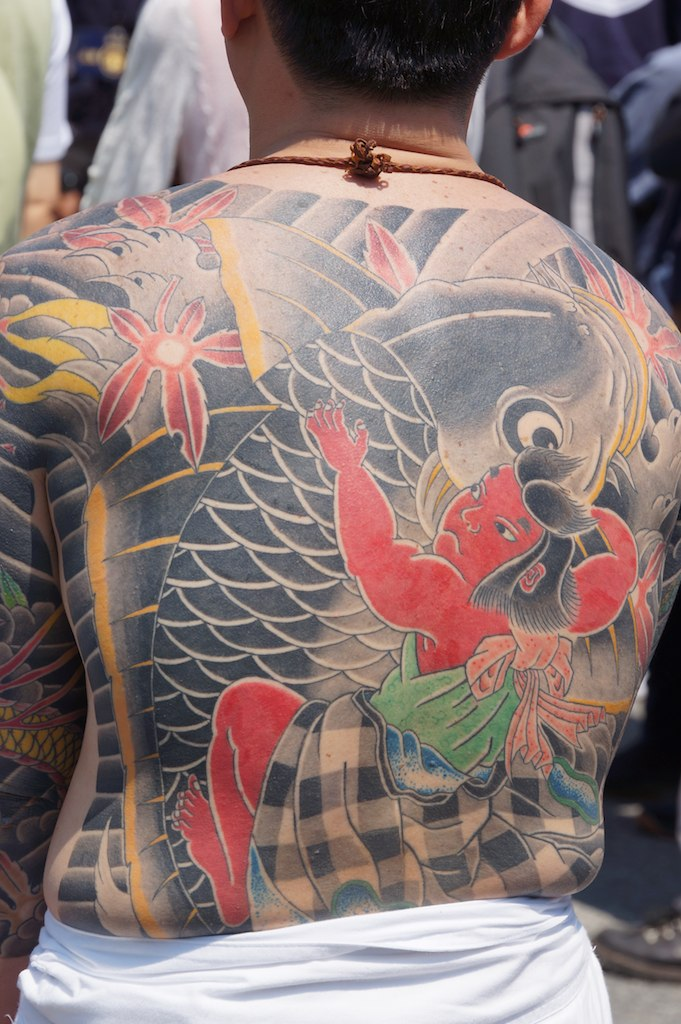
An irezumi tattoo of Kintarō

The name and certain traits of the main character of Gin Tama, Gintoki Sakata, are loosely based on Kintarō. The relation has also been confirmed in Gin Tama's episode 98 and manga volume 10. Gintoki has its name contain the character for "silver" instead of "gold", and he has silver hair. One of his nemeses, the golden-haired Sakata Kintoki, also made an appearance.

- In the anime series Otogi Zoshi, Kintaro is one of the main characters.
- The Imagin Kintaros from the tokusatsu series Kamen Rider Den-O is based on Kintarō, emulating the bear and axe elements.
- In the video game Otogi 2: Immortal Warriors developed by From Software, Kintoki wields a large axe as his main weapon, known as the 'Crimson Axe'.
- Kintarō appears as an alien character who rides a flying bear and wields a small (but large for his size) axe in the animated television series Urusei Yatsura.
- In the anime and manga series The Prince of Tennis, a character by the name of Tōyama Kintarō is the youngest regular member of the Shitenhoji Middle School tennis team. He is named after Kintarō, and shares his namesake's amazing superhuman strength.
- In the series One Piece, the character called Sentoumaru has a design based on Kintaro (he wears the same clothes and wields a giant battle axe). Even his signature attacks is called Ashigara Dokkoi.
- In the Power Instinct video game series, Kintaro appears as a playable character as Kintaro Kokuin. He uses his animal friends, such as a bear and a koi fish, as well as his axe, to attack the opponent, and is capable of transforming into a dog-like superhero named "Poochy".
- In the video game Persona 4, Kintaro becomes a playable persona, under the name Kintoki-Douji. In a visual pun, instead of carrying an axe, it carries a Tomahawk missile.
- In the anime Kai Doh Maru, Kintoki is a girl who passes as a boy and is rescued by Raiko no Minamoto from her evil uncle Shuten Doji. He trains her to be a fighter ( specializing in thrown axe and battle axe ) but their love ends in death.
- In the video game Animal Crossing: New Leaf, the clothing shop "Able Sisters" will sometimes display a wig in the accessories section of the store that the player can purchase, and is styled similarly to Kintarō's own hairstyle.
- In the second season of the anime Garo: The Animation, Kintoki is an ageless boy of the Heian Period who serves under Raikō as his retainer, in their fight against horrors.
- In the anime and manga series Gintama, the protagonist Sakata Gintoki is partially inspired by Kintarō, as stated by the author Hideaki Sorachi.
- In the mobile game Fate/Grand Order, Sakata Kintoki is a Berserker-class Servant. He debuts as an ally in the London chapter. He is shown to have fascination towards golden things, and even has the tendency of saying the English word "Gold" and "Golden". His overall design is modernized; akin to a Yakuza mob boss and he wields an elemental (lightning) axe. He also appears alternatively as a Rider-class Servant, where his appearance is akin to bōsōzoku gang member and rides his bike "Unit Golden Bear". In this class, he fights with spiky fisticuffs; fused with his lightning power.
- In the video game Nioh, Kintoki appears in the last sub-mission of the Kinki Region, Greater Demon Hunting, to assist the player character, William, in defeating a powerful demon. In the sequel, Nioh 2, Sakata Kintoki makes another appearance with Minamoto no Yorimitsu and the other three members of the Shitennō.
- In the video game Yo-kai Watch Blasters, Kintaro is another Jibanyan clone by the name of Kintaronyan. Kintaronyan is sometimes befriended with the item "Kintaronyan Candy" on the stage, "Momotaro Hunter 2".
- In the TMNT 2012 cartoon, Kintaro is an anthropormophic pug who accompanies Usagi Miyamoto. When the Ninja Turtles are transported to their dimension they help Usagi protect him from the demon Jei. He's depicted as a rude and spoiled brat but later warms up to Usagi and the turtles.
- In episode 23 of the anime To Love Ru, Yuuki Mikan, sister of the protagonist Yuuki Rito, appears as Kintaro.
- In the 2001 animated hit classic Spirited Away, the main antagonist Yubaba, which means bathhouse witch, has a son that is based on kintarō. He is a gigantic baby named Boh and his only article of clothing is a huge red bib that is kanji for 'Bō', or boy.
- In the manga Record of Ragnarok, Kintaro, by his later name of Sakata Kintoki, appears as a human fighter battling gods of several pantheons in a tournament to decide the fate of the human species.
- In the video game Spirit Hunter: NG, Kubitarou of Kintoki is loosely based on Kintarō.
- In the Marvel Comics' Death of the Venomverse miniseries, Kintaro is known as Kid Venom, an alternate version of Venom created by artist Taigami.
- In the video game series Mortal Kombat, there is a shokan character named Kintaro named after the Japanese folklore character

== See also ==
- Momotarō
- Bear's Son Tale
