= Manga Entertainment =

Defunct UK and US anime distributor

- Manga Entertainment Ltd. (UK branch) Manga Entertainment, LLC (U.S. branch) Manga Entertainment Australia Pty. Ltd. (Australian branch)
- U.S. logo of Manga Entertainment
- Successor: Madman Entertainment (late 1990s–present, Australian branch) Lionsgate Home Entertainment (2017–present, U.S. branch) Crunchyroll UK and Ireland (2021–present, UK branch)
- Formation: December 4, 1987; 38 years ago (UK branch) 1993; 33 years ago (U.S. branch) 1993; 33 years ago (Australian branch)
- Defunct: Australian branch: late 1990s U.S. branch: 2017; 9 years ago UK branch: April 19, 2021; 5 years ago
- Type: Subsidiary
- Location: London, United Kingdom (UK company) Los Angeles, California, United States (U.S. company)
- Products: Anime
- Services: Film and television distribution
- Parent organization: Island World Group (1991–1998) Starz Distribution (2004–2017)

Manga Entertainment was a producer, licensor, and distributor of anime in the United Kingdom and Ireland, the United States, and Australia. Originally founded in the UK in 1991, the UK branch became Crunchyroll UK and Ireland, also currently known as Crunchyroll Ltd. since 2022, while its U.S. branch was absorbed into Starz Inc. (now owned by Lionsgate Studios) and its Australian branch was also absorbed into Madman Entertainment.

Despite its name, the company's principal business was the distribution of anime rather than manga, although they published some manga (such as Crying Freeman) under the Manga Books imprint.

== History ==
Manga Entertainment's original logo and initial imprint

Manga Entertainment (formerly Island World Communications) was founded in London in 1991 by Chris Blackwell and Andy Frain, with Laurence Guinness in a key role, as a subsidiary of Island Records' Island World Group. IWC took over the company number for Golden Square Music, but had no relationship to IWC or Manga.

Manga Entertainment expanded into North America in 1993 with the purchase of L.A. Hero, forming Manga U.S. while Manga UK entered the Australian market in late 1993, off the back of strong import sales. Manga UK had originally chosen Village Roadshow to be their Australian distributor, but began releasing titles in January 1994 in conjunction with the Australian division of Island's parent company, PolyGram (through PolyGram Video) and local independent distributor Siren Entertainment. Madman Entertainment assumed the Australian operations of Manga Entertainment in the late 1990s and inherited the Australian rights to the entire Manga U.S. & UK catalogue, while retaining Siren Entertainment as a distributor until 2001, when Madman Entertainment established its own distribution company, The AV Channel.

On May 13, 2004, IDT Entertainment, a division of IDT Corporation announced they would purchase Manga U.S., becoming a subsidiary of IDT Entertainment. In 2005, Manga UK and Manga U.S. began to operate independently from each other, but still remain under the same ownership. Liberty Media would then purchase IDT Entertainment in 2006, which would be renamed Starz Media.

In 2011, Manga U.S. ceased licensing new products after the release of Redline and was absorbed into Starz Media. On August 8, 2012, Liberty Media announced that it would spin-off Starz Media into a separate publicly traded company. The spin-off of Starz Inc. was completed on January 15, 2013, which included all subsidiaries.

=== 2015–present ===
On February 26, 2015, the UK branch was acquired from Starz Media, alongside its parent Anchor Bay UK, by managing director Colin Lomax. Anchor Bay UK was renamed to Platform Entertainment and went on to have exclusive rights to the Manga Entertainment branding and catalog in the UK and Ireland.

In June 2016, Lionsgate announced they would acquire Starz Inc. which would eventually be completed in December 2016, placing Manga U.S. under Lionsgate Home Entertainment. In the same month, Kaleidoscope Film Distribution announced they had purchased Platform Entertainment and confirmed that they would split Manga UK off to become separately operated. After Platform Entertainment stopped distributing Manga titles, they went on to having their titles released in the UK by Spirit Entertainment.

In 2017, Lionsgate Home Entertainment relaunched Manga U.S.' website and its Facebook and Twitter pages, and confirmed a relaunch in the near future. Lionsgate currently licenses the Manga Entertainment brand-name from Crunchyroll. In the following year, the CEO Colin Lomax had died, between Christmas 2017 and New Years Day 2018. As of April 2026, Manga U.S.' website was shut down, with some of Manga's titles like Ghost in the Shell being rereleased under the main Lionsgate banner.

== See also ==
- Manga Force: The Ultimate Collection
