= Shitennō (Minamoto clan) =

List of samurai

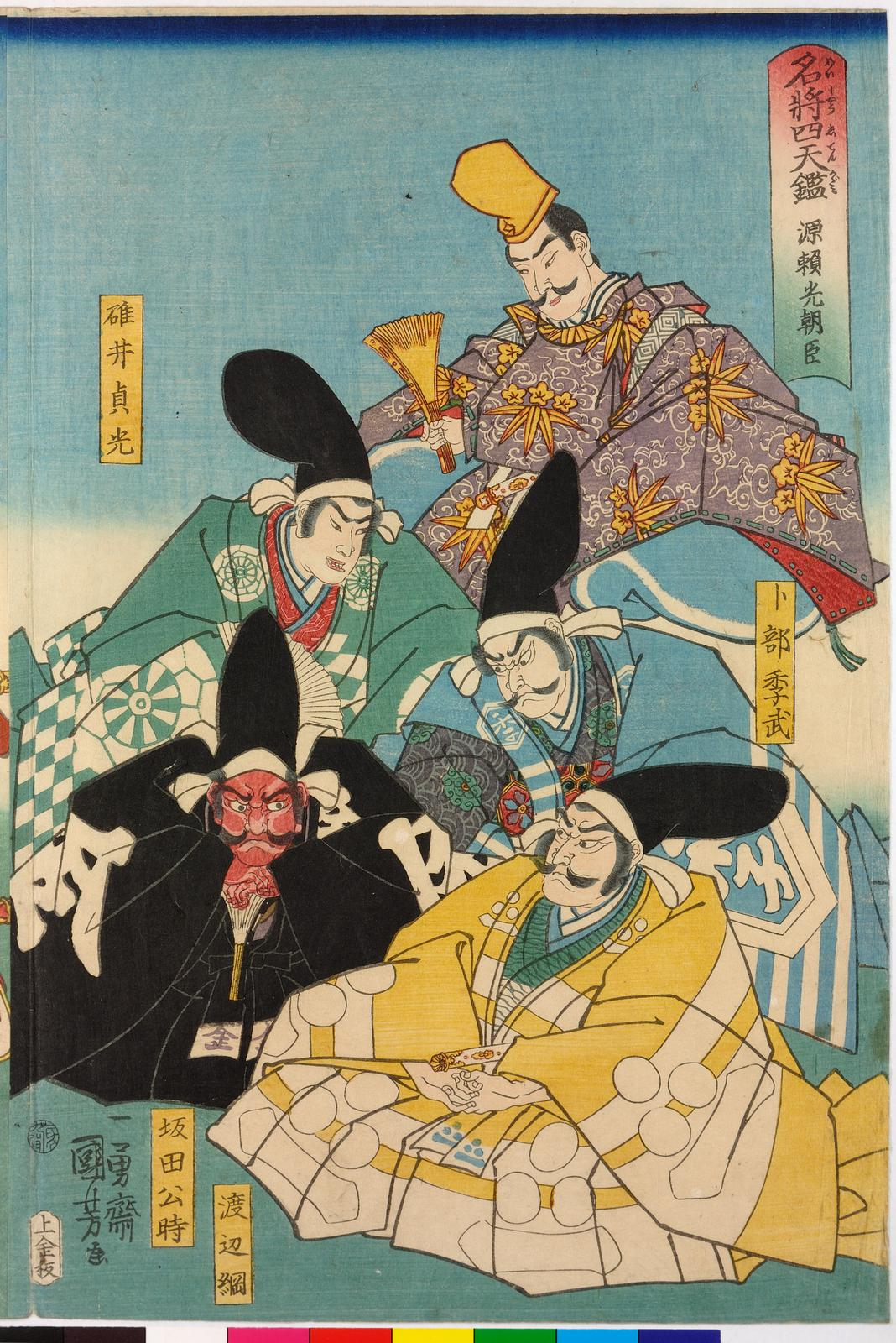
Minamoto no Yorimitsu holding a closed fan; his four retainers are all seated in court robes (clockwise from top: Usui Sadamitsu, Urabe Suetake, Watanabe no Tsuna, and Sakata no Kintoki).

Shitennō (四天王), a Japanese term normally referring to the Buddhist Four Heavenly Kings, is also applied to particularly famous or loyal retainers, in groups of four, to certain of Japan's most famous legendary and historical figures.

The following four are referred to in legend as the Shitennō of Minamoto no Yorimitsu (also known as Raikō) (948–1021):

- Sakata no Kintoki – known as Kaidomaru in his past. Kintoki originated from the House of Suzaku.
- Urabe no Suetake – Originated from the House of Seiryū
- Usui Sadamitsu – Originated from the House of Genbu.
- Watanabe no Tsuna – Originated from the House of Byakko.

Minamoto no Yoshitsune (1159–1189) was accompanied by the following four, his so-called Shitennō, who are featured in the kabuki play Yoshitsune Senbon Zakura and other works:

- Suruga Jirō Kiyoshige (駿河次郎清重)
- Kamei Rokurō Shigekiyô (亀井六郎重清)
- Kataoka Hachirō Tsuneharu (片岡八郎常春)
- Ise Saburō Yoshimori (伊勢三郎義盛)

== See also ==
- The Four Symbols of Chinese astronomy
