= Minamoto no Yorimitsu =

Japanese official (948–1021)

- 源 頼光
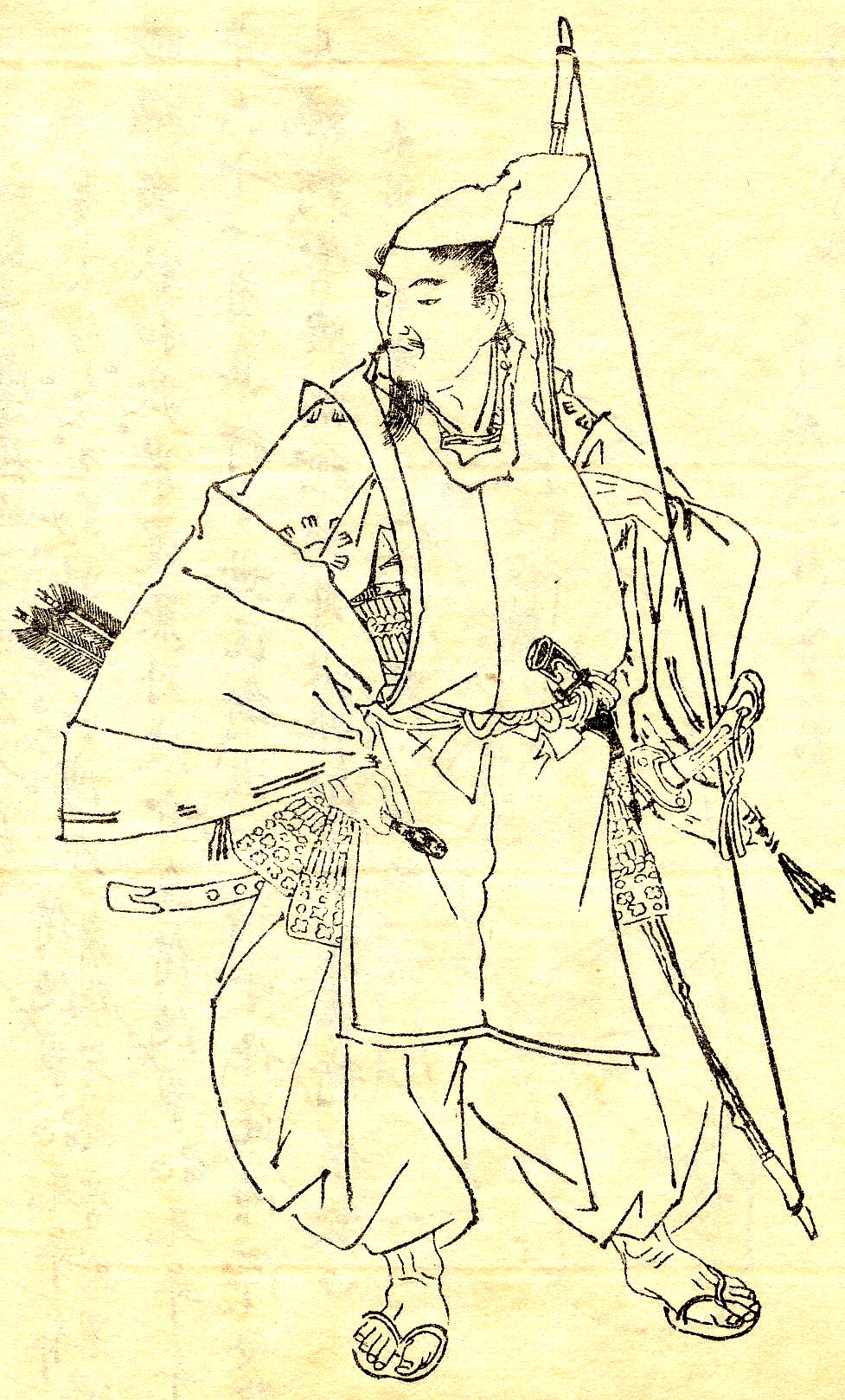
- Minamoto no Yorimitsu, picture was drawn by Kikuchi Yōsai（菊池容斎）

Head of Settsu Genji
- Succeeded by: Unknown

Personal details
- Born: Monjumaru; 948
- Died: 29 August 1021 (aged 72–73)
- Spouse(s): Daughter of Fujiwara no Motohira; Daughter of Taira no Koretaka; Daughter of Yoshishige no Tamemasa
- Children: Minamoto no Yorikuni; Minamoto no Yorimoto; Eiju; Minamoto no Yoriaki; Fujiwara no Michitsuna's wife
- Parents: Minamoto no Mitsunaka (father); Daughter of Minamoto no Suguru (mother)
- Relatives: Minamoto no Tsunemoto (grandfather); Minamoto no Yorichika (brother); Minamoto no Yorinobu (brother)
- Nickname: Minamoto no Raikō

Military service
- Allegiance: Minamoto clan
- Branch/service: Minamoto clan

Minamoto no Yorimitsu (源 頼光; 948 – August 29, 1021), also known as Minamoto no Raikō, was a Japanese samurai of the Heian period, who served the regents of the Fujiwara clan along with his brother Yorinobu, taking the violent measures the Fujiwara were themselves unable to take. He is one of the earliest Minamoto of historical note for his military exploits, and is known for quelling the bandits of Ōeyama.

His loyal service earned him the governorships of Izu Province, Kozuke and a number of others in turn, as well as a number of other high government positions. Yorimitsu served as commander of a regiment of the Imperial Guard, and as a secretary in the Ministry of War. When his father Minamoto no Mitsunaka died, he inherited Settsu Province.

In legend, Yorimitsu is featured as a monster-slaying hero, usually accompanied by his four legendary retainers, known as the Shitennō (The Four Heavenly Kings). They were Watanabe no Tsuna, Sakata no Kintoki, Urabe no Suetake, and Usui Sadamitsu.

== Legends ==
Yorimitsu is featured in a number of legends and tales, including the legend of Kintarō (Golden Boy a.k.a. Sakata no Kintoki), the legend of Shuten Dōji, and the legend of Tsuchigumo. The tachi (long sword) 'Dōjigiri' owned by Tokyo National Museum and selected as a National Treasure and Tenka-Goken ("Five Swords under Heaven"), and 'Onikirimaru' owned by Tada Shrine, have a legend that Yorimitsu beheaded Shuten Dōji. (Note: 'Onikirimaru' has the same name as another name of 'Higekiri', but they are different swords.) Also, three swords of the same name, 'Hizamaru' (Note: also known as 'Kumokiri', 'Hoemaru' and 'Usumidori') owned by Daikaku-ji Temple, Hakone Shrine and an individual, have a legend that Yorimitsu beat off Tsuchigumo.

The Karatsu Kunchi festival in Karatsu City, Saga Prefecture, features a large float inspired by the helmet of Minamoto, being partially devoured by the oni Shuten Douji.

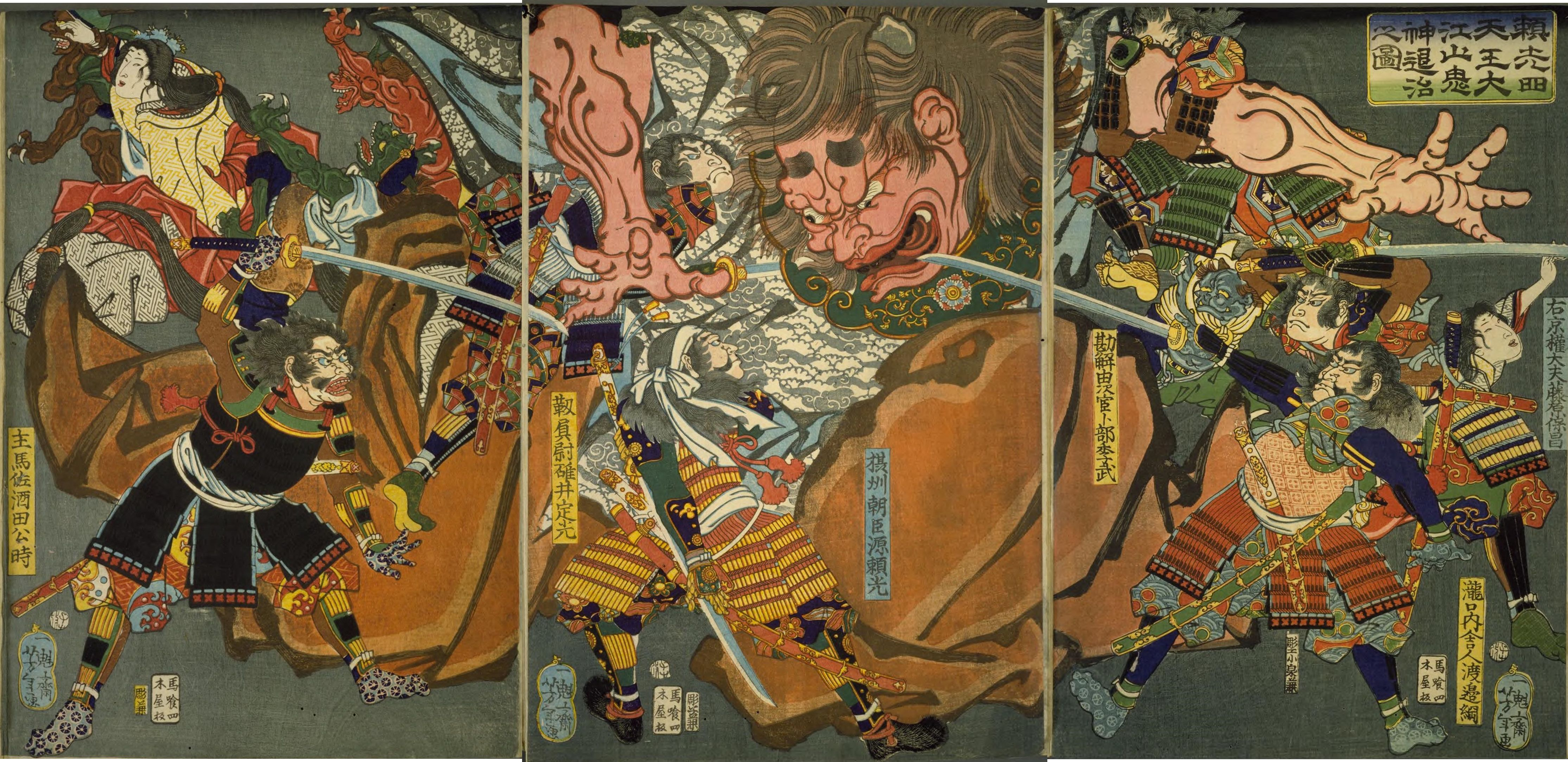
An ukiyo-e by Yoshitoshi depicting Minamoto no Yorimitsu's retainers, Watanabe no Tsuna, Urabe no Suetake, Usui Sadamitsu, and Sakata no Kintoki and aristocrat Fujiwara no Yasumasa fighting Shuten-dōji on Ōeyama.

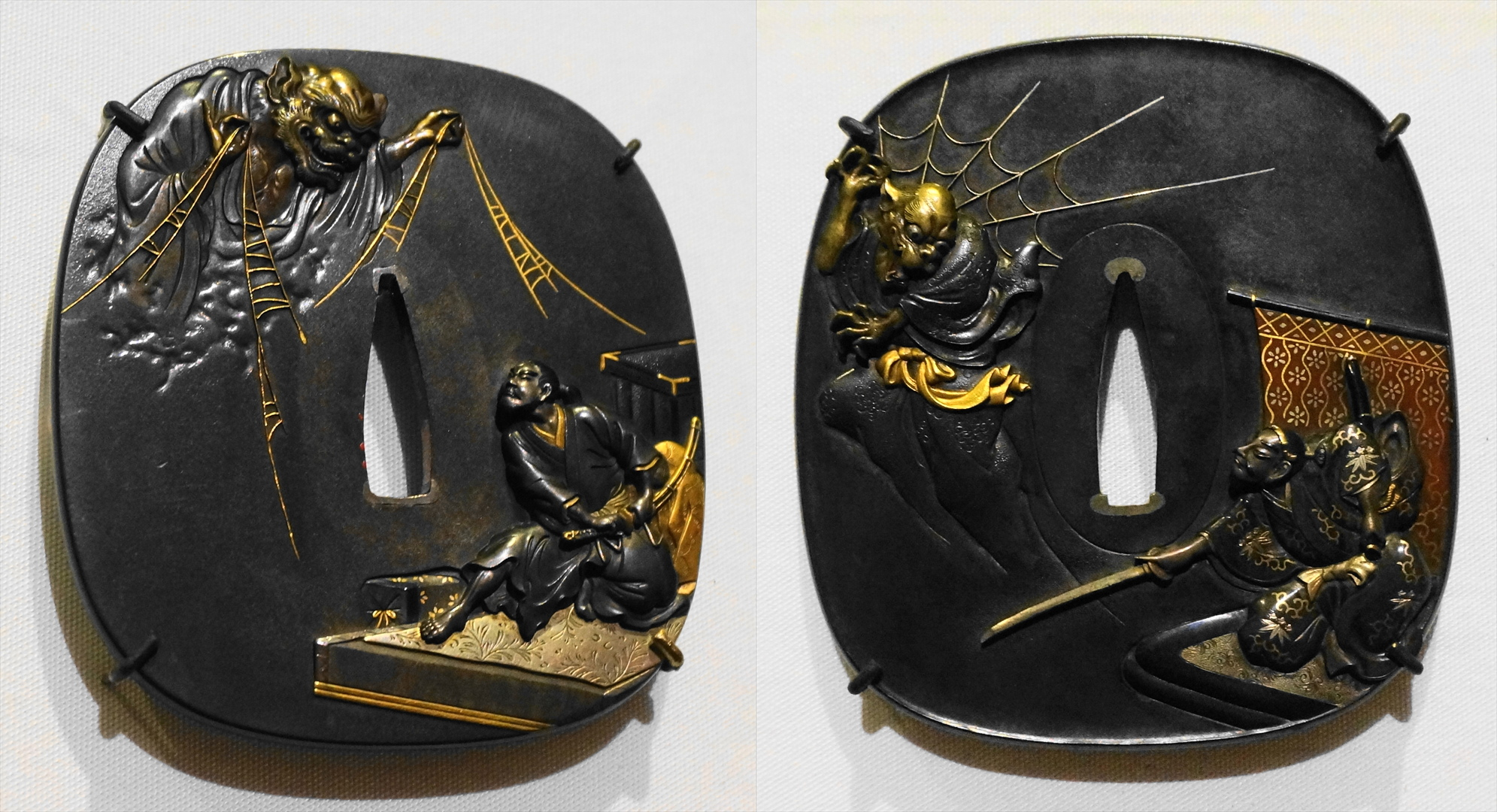
Two tsuba (Sword guard) depicting Yorimitsu trying to cut a tsuchigumo with a tachi named 'Hizamaru'. made by Unnno Yoshimori I (left), Gochiku Sadakatsu (right). Museum of Fine Arts, Boston.

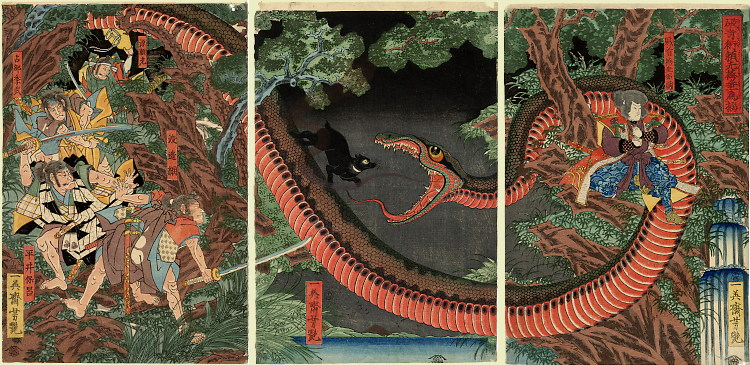
"A Strange Account of the Destruction of the Bandits by the Elite Four" (Yorimitsu, Watanabe no Tsuna, Urabe no Suetake, and Fujiwara no Yasumasa.), Yomihon book by Utagawa Toyokuni and Takizawa Bakin.

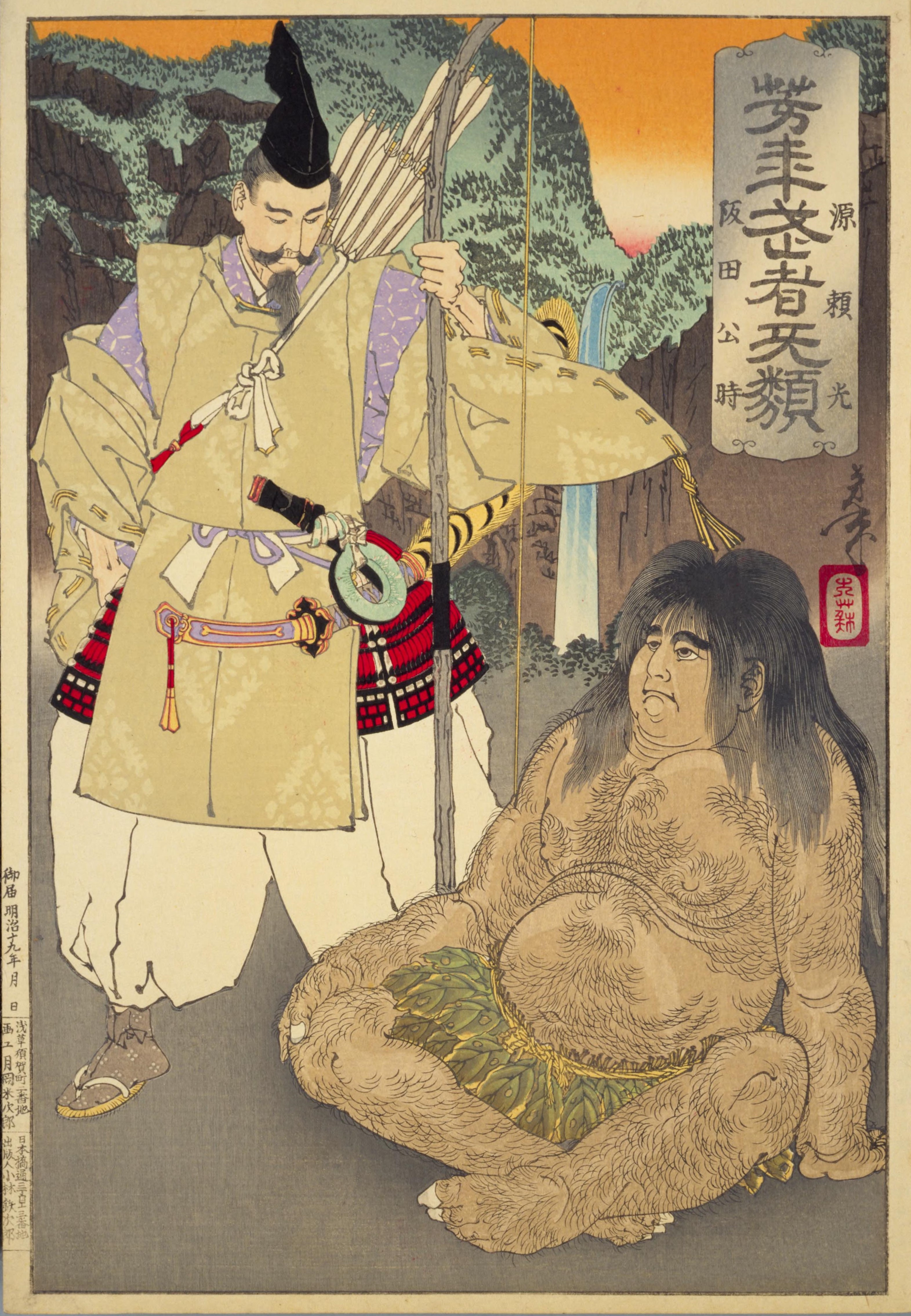
An ukiyo-e by Yoshitoshi depicting Minamoto no Yorimitsu and Kintarō, 1886, Warriors Trembling with Courage.

== Family ==
- Mother: Daughter of Minamoto no Suguru
- Father:Minamoto no Mitsunaka
- Wife:Daughter of Fujiwara no Motohira
  - 1st son : Minamoto no Yorikuni
- Wife:Daughter of Taira no Koretaka
  - 2nd son : Minamoto no Yoriie
- Wife:Daughter of Yoshishige no Tamemasa
  - 3rd son:Minamoto no Yorimoto
  - 4th son: Eiju
  - 5th son:Minamoto no Yoriaki
  - daughter:Fujiwara no Michitsuna's wife

== Poetry ==
Yorimitsu wrote a renga with his wife, which appears in the Kin'yō Wakashū (nos.703-704):
tade karu fune no suguru narikeri
asa madaki kararo no oto no kikoyuru wa
This translates as:
a boat harvesting smartweed is passing by
I thought I heard someone rowing smartly before dawn

== In popular culture ==
- Appears in the video game Nioh 2 as a female yokai hunter. She is voiced by Yūko Kaida.
- Appears as a summonable character in the mobile game in Fate/Grand Order. She is voiced by Haruka Tomatsu.
- Appears as the protagonist in the Otogi game series.
- Appears as the ancestor of the Minamoto clan in the manga and anime series Toilet-bound Hanako-kun.
- Appears as a character in the RPG game Onmyoji.
- Appears as a lead character in the second entry of the Garo: The Animation anime series while going under the name Raikou, voiced by Masei Nakayama.
- The main character in the anime Otogi Zoshi disguises themselves as Raikou in the entire first half of the series.

== See also ==
- Minamoto clan
- Seiwa Genji
- Toki clan
- Sagami (poet)
- Dōjigiri
