= Otogi Zoshi (TV series) =

Japanese anime television series

お伽草子
- Created by: Production I.G; Nippon Television
- Anime television series
- Directed by: Mizuho Nishikubo
- Produced by: Toshio Nakatani; Yoshinori Sugano; Kiyoto Inada; Katsuji Morishita
- Written by: Yoshiki Sakurai
- Music by: Hideki Taniuchi (1–13); Kenji Kawai (14–26)
- Studio: Production I.G
- Licensed by: AUS: Madman Entertainment; NA: AnimeWorks
- Original network: NTV
- Original run: July 6, 2004 – March 29, 2005
- Episodes: 26
- Manga
- Written by: Narumi Seto
- Published by: Mag Garden
- English publisher: AUS: Madman Entertainment; NA: Tokyopop
- Magazine: Comic Blade
- Original run: February 10, 2005 – July 8, 2005
- Volumes: 2
- Anime television film

Special Chapter: Kimon
- Directed by: Mizuho Nishikubo
- Written by: Yoshiki Sakurai
- Music by: Hideki Taniuchi; Kenji Kawai
- Studio: Production I.G
- Original network: NTV
- Released: 22 March 2005
- Runtime: 30 minutes
- Anime television film

Special Chapter: Minato
- Directed by: Mizuho Nishikubo
- Written by: Yoshiki Sakurai
- Music by: Hideki Taniuchi; Kenji Kawai
- Studio: Production I.G
- Original network: Nippon TV
- Released: 29 March 2005
- Runtime: 30 minutes

Otogi Zoshi (お伽草子, Otogizōshi, lit. Fairy-Tale Book) is a Japanese anime television series produced by Production I.G.

A manga adaptation was published in Comic Blade in 2005.

== Plot ==
The story is divided in two story arcs. The "Heian Chapter" takes place in Kyoto during the Heian period and follows Minamoto no Hikaru, the younger sister of Minamoto no Raikō, on a quest to save Japan. The "Tokyo Chapter" follows the reincarnations of Hikaru and her comrades as the ancient evils of days past manifest themselves in present-day Tokyo.

=== Heian Chapter ===
The "Heian Chapter" is set in the middle of the Heian period, where the people of the capital of Kyoto are in deep agony, focusing their last hopes on the retrieval of the five magatama that represent the five elements (Metal, Wood, Water, Fire and Earth). Legend has it that when the magatama are laid together, their circle of Affinity will save the capital from suffering and whoever places the last stone is to become the emperor.

Three of the Magatamas are scattered throughout Japan. The Emperor, relying on the prophecies of Abe no Seimei, delegates the task of recovering the three lost Magatamas to Minamoto no Raikō of the Minamoto clan. However, Raikō is struck by an epidemic and barely able to move. Instead his younger sister, Hikaru, secretly takes his place.

Hikaru is joined by Watanabe no Tsuna, Usui Sadamitsu, Urabe no Suetake and Kintarō and manages to collect all but one magatama: the Magatama of Fire.

Hikaru returns to the capital with news that Shutendouji, who possesses the missing magatama, has plans to attack. The court does not believe her, but Hikaru and her party decide to stop Shutendouji and recover the last magatama. With the five magatama in hand, Seimei's true intent is revealed. The onmyoji plans to create a circle of Enmity and bring about the destruction of the capital in order to save it.

Hikaru confronts Abe no Seimei, only to find out that he is none other than Mansairaku, her love. She tries to shoot him with an arrow but she is constantly held back by her feelings. Hikaru keeps demanding that Mansairaku stop his destructive spell, but he does not listen. She charges towards him with her dagger, but fails to pierce his heart, and he continues with the spell.

Just after the final pillar of light appears and the destruction of the capital begins, Hikaru starts to play her flute, a sound that Mansairaku always loved. Hikaru then tries to remove one of the Magatamas and stops the spell. When she tries, her flute falls on the Magatama of Fire and breaks it, causing the spell to end. As a result, Hikaru's and Mansairaku's souls fly to heaven.

As the capital settles from its near destruction, Sadamitsu and Kintaro, the only surviving heroes of Hikaru's group, lay to rest the souls of Hikaru, Tsuna and Urabe. Kintaro asks Sadamitsu, " Where did they go?" To which Sadamitsu answers, "They went off to this place full of flowers, some place far away."

=== Tokyo Chapter ===
The "Tokyo Chapter" follows the reincarnations of Hikaru and her comrades in present-day Tokyo. Hikaru is a high school student and the landlady of an apartment housing called Minamoto Heights. While her tenants include the freelance writer Tsuna, the fortuneteller Urabe, Sadamitsu and a little boy named Kintaro.

Hikaru's brother, Raiko, has been missing for a year when she sees him for the first time amidst a crowd of people in Tokyo. While the story evolves, Hikaru is confronted with even stranger events, like the appearance of a ghost train on the Yamanote-Line and the recurring encounters with Mansairaku. Eventually, Hikaru finds out the locations where paranormal phenomena are occurring are related and interacting because of their affinity with the five elements. The Japanese capital is, once again, threatened with destruction. Hikaru, Hikaru's party and Mansairaku join forces to restore the circle of Affinity and save Tokyo. Having put right the ancient wrongs, Mansairaku vanishes and Hikaru's brother returns.

== Characters ==
Minamoto no Hikaru / Hikaru (源光 / ヒカル; Voiced by: Fumie Mizusawa (Japanese); Julie Ann Taylor (English))

Watanabe no Tsuna / Tsuna (渡辺綱 / 綱, Watanabe no Tsuna; Voiced by: Kenta Miyake (Japanese); Jamieson Price (English))

Abe no Seimei (安倍晴明, Abe no Seimei; Voiced by: Kan Tokumaru (Japanese); Tom Wyner (English))

Mansairaku (万歳楽; Voiced by: Shin-ichiro Miki (Japanese); Lex Lang (English))

Minamoto no Raikou (源頼光; Voiced by: Shin-ichiro Miki (Japanese); Steve Staley (English))

Urabe no Suetake / Urabe (卜部季武 / 卜部, Urabe no Suetake; Voiced by: Kumi Sakuma (Japanese); Melissa Fahn (English))

Usui no Sadamitsu (碓井貞光, Usui no Sadamitsu; Voiced by: Ōki Sugiyama (Japanese); Kirk Thornton (English))

Kintarō (金太郎, Kintarō; Voiced by: Wasabi Mizuta (Japanese); Mona Marshall (English))

Shutendoji (Voiced by: Yasunori Matsumoto (Japanese); Jeffrey Stackhouse (English))

Ibaraki (Voiced by: Kaho Kōda (Japanese); Dorothy Elias-Fahn (English))

Kuzume (Voiced by: Mayumi Asano; (Japanese); Mari Devon (English))

Hoshikuma (Voiced by: Otoya Kawano (Japanese); Kim Strauss (English))

== Production ==
=== Broadcast ===
Otogi Zoshi aired on Nippon Television from 6 July 2004 to 4 January 2005, totaling 24 episodes.

On 22 March 2005, NTV aired the first part of the "Special Chapter". Also known as "Kimon" (鬼門), the episode takes place one year before the events of the Tokyo Chapter and focuses on Urabe. The second part, Minato (都), aired the following week. The special takes place before the events of the Tokyo Chapter and focuses on Mansairaku, who reflects on his deeds while talking to a stranger about his mission to guard the city.

=== Music ===
The music for the "Heian Chapter" was composed by Hideki Taniuchi, while Kenji Kawai composed the music for the "Tokyo Chapter".

The first opening theme is ("Zen"), performed by Attack Haus, while the first ending theme is ("Hoshi ni Negai wo"), performed by Chieko Kawabe. The second opening theme ("Ashita wa Kyou to Onaji Mirai"), performed by Gomes the Hitman, while the second ending theme is ("Cry Baby"), performed by Chieko Kawabe.
