= Usui Sadamitsu =

Japanese Taira samurai

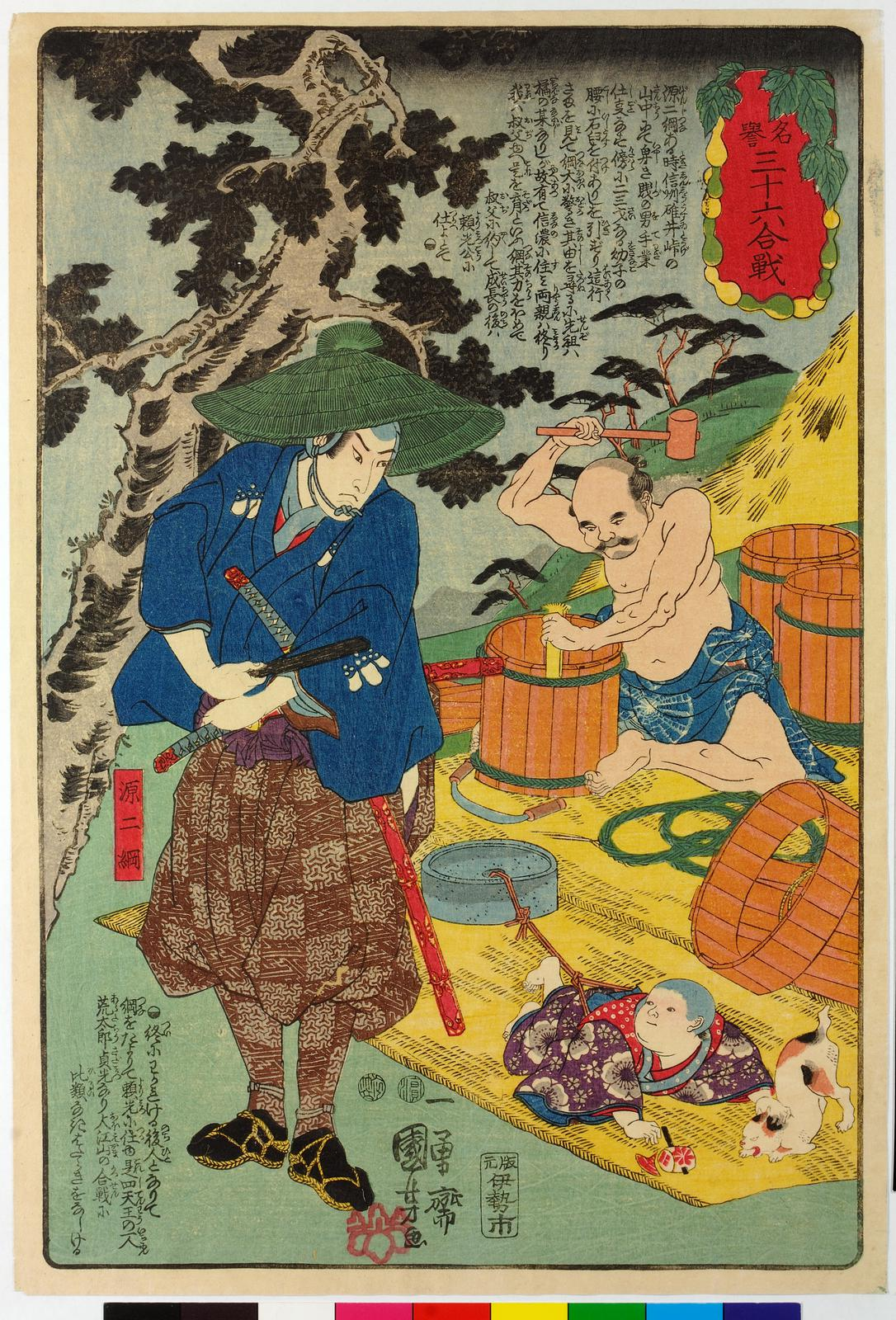
Genji Tsuna in travelling dress watching the strength of the child Usui no Sadamitsu, who is dragging a heavy piece of iron used by his father in the manufacture of barrels.)

Usui Sadamitsu (碓井貞光) was a warrior of the mid-Heian period. His official name was Taira no Sadamitsu (平忠通).

== Stories featuring Sadamitsu ==
According to Otogizōshi stories compiled several centuries later, Sadamitsu was a retainer of the Japanese legendary hero Minamoto no Raikō. Sadamitsu is known as one of The Four Guardian Kings under Raikō. Alternatively, in Konjaku Monogatari he is listed as one of three retainers to Raikō. Following the Tale of the Ground Spider within the tale of Raikō, Sadamitsu personally protected Raikō when he was suffering a mysterious ailment. Sadamitsu is also depicted in artwork and kabuki plays. At times Sadamitsu is depicted as female.

On the way from Echigo to Ueno, Sadamitsu was sleeping outdoors while chanting sutras. He received a prophecy saying, "I am touched by the sincerity of your chanting and will grant you a sacred spring that will cure the illnesses of 40,000 people. I am the divine spirit of this mountain." Sadamitsu then investigated the surrounding area and found a hot spring, which he called "Omusou no Yu" (the hot spring of dreams), and this is how Shima Onsen came to be.

On another occasion, when Sadamitsu returned home, he found a giant venomous snake living in Usui Pass, tormenting the people. With the protection of the Eleven-Headed Kannon Bodhisattva Ekādaśamukha, Sadamitsu swung his scythe and defeated the snake. He then built the Usui-san Joko-in Kongo-ji Temple and enshrined the Kannon Bodhisattva and the snake's skull there.

In the fairy story Kintaro, he was given the role to find Kintaro on Ashigarayama (Mt. Ashigara) by disguising himself as a logger and took him to meet Minamoto no Yorimitsu.

== In popular culture ==
- He appears as one of the central characters in the anime Otogi Zoshi, a retelling of the adventures of Minamoto no Raikō with his Shitennō.
