= Otogi 2: Immortal Warriors =

2003 video game

- Developer: FromSoftware
- Publishers: JP: FromSoftware; NA/EU: Sega
- Producer: Masanori Takeuchi
- Designers: Kunihiro Sadamoto; Dai Takemura; Kazuhiro Hamatani
- Programmer: Takeshi Suzuki
- Artist: Keiichiro Ogawa
- Composer: Yuki Ichiki
- Platform: Xbox
- Release: JP: December 25, 2003; NA: October 19, 2004; EU: February 11, 2005
- Genres: Action role-playing, hack and slash
- Mode: Single-player

Otogi 2: Immortal Warriors, known in Japan as Otogi: Hyakki Toubatsu Emaki (O・TO・GI 〜百鬼討伐絵巻〜), is a 2003 action role-playing game developed by FromSoftware and published by Sega. It is the sequel to Otogi: Myth of Demons. The game is backwards compatible on Xbox One and Xbox Series consoles.

== Plot ==
Players assume the role of Raikoh Minamoto, the undead warrior charged with the task of vanquishing the demonic infestation that plagued Japan's sacred capital. Continuing where the original left off, Otogi 2 puts players in the role of Raikoh, who is summoned once again to destroy the invading demons. This time however, he is not alone, and with the help of some new allies, Raikoh and his loyal followers go out to destroy the demons once and for all and prevent darkness from consuming the world.

== Reception ==
Reception

Aggregate score
Aggregator	Score
Metacritic	79/100

Review scores
Publication	Score
Edge	8/10
Electronic Gaming Monthly	8.67/10
Famitsu	30/40
Game Informer	7/10
GamePro	3/5
GameRevolution	C+
GameSpot	8.3/10
GameSpy	3.5/5
GameZone	8.8/10
IGN	8.4/10
Official Xbox Magazine (US)	8.9/10
The Sydney Morning Herald	3.5/5

Otogi 2 received "generally favorable" reviews according to video game review aggregator Metacritic. In Japan, Famitsu gave it a score of one seven, two eights, and one seven, for a total of 30 out of 40. Otogi 2 was a runner-up for GameSpot's 2004 "Best Voice Acting" award, which went to Grand Theft Auto: San Andreas.

The game sold poorly, however. Responding to a letter questioning why Electronic Gaming Monthly ran such a short review on Otogi 2, Dan Hsu, editor-in-chief of the publication, stated, "As good of a game Otogi 2 is, we still have to acknowledge that relatively few people want to read about it."
