= List of dams in Iwate Prefecture =

The following is a list of dams in Iwate Prefecture, Japan.

== List ==
Name	Location	Opened	Height (metres)	Image
Akazawa Dam				
Appi Bosai Dam				
Arasawa No. 1 Dam		1972	38	
Arasawa No.2 Dam		1989	45.5	
Arasawa No.3 Dam		1960	22	
Fudai Dam			37.3	
Gando Dam		1960	40	
Gosho Dam		1981	52.5	
Hayachine Dam		2000	73.5	
Hinata Dam			56.5	
Hisanai Tameike Dam		1982	27	
Ikatai Dam			40	
Irihata Dam		1990	80	
Isawa Dam		2013		
Ishibane Dam		1953	20.5	
Ishibuchi Dam		1953		
Iwasaki Nojo Tameike Dam		1938	24.2	
Kanagoezawa Dam		2005	43	
Kemuyama Dam			21.8	
Koromogawa No.1 Dam		1963	35.5	
Koromogawa No.2 Dam		1971	34	
Koromogawa No.3 Dam			41	
Koromogawa No.4 Dam			33	
Koromogawa No.5 Dam			20.5	
Kuzumaru Dam		1991	51.7	
Neishi Dam			41	
Ono Dam			26	
Ohsawa Dam		1943	30.8	
Oshida Dam			63.7	
Oshuku Dam			17.5	
Rentaki Dam			37.7	
Ryorigawa Dam		2000	43	
Sannokai Dam		2001	61.5	
Senganishi Dam		1934	31.3	
Senmatsu Dam			26.8	
Setsukinai Dam			38.5	
Shijushida Dam		1968	50	
Sorihikizawa Tameike Dam		1935	23.5	
Sotomasuzawa Dam			22.5	
Sotoyama Dam			33	
Taki Dam			70	
Takou Dam		2006	77	
Tase Dam		1954	81.5	
Tokitosawa Tameike Dam		1988	16	
Tono Dam		1957	26.5	
Tono No.2 Dam		2010	23.1	
Toyosawa Dam		1961	59.1	
Tsunatori Dam		1982	59	
Yabitsu Dam		1981	33.5	
Yanagawa Dam			77.2	
Yuda Dam		1964	89.5	
Yukiyagawa Dam		1977	28.4	
Wakayanagi Dam				

== See also ==
- Media related to Dams in Iwate prefecture at Wikimedia Commons
