= Waga River =

River in Iwate Prefecture, Japan

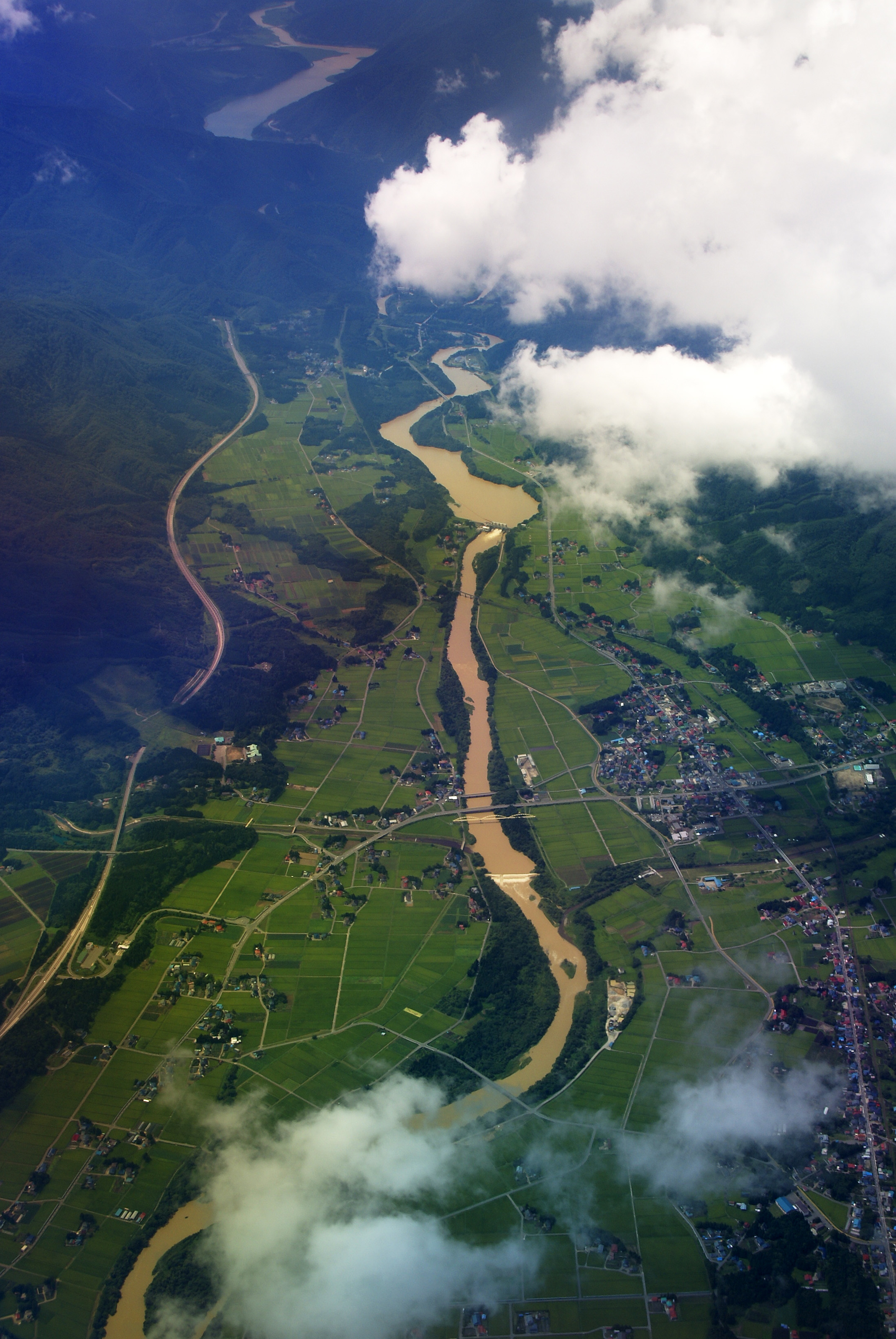
- Aerial view of the Waga River with Ishibane Dam in the center and Yuda Dam and Lake Kinshu visible in the distance

- Location within Japan
- Native name: 和賀川 (Japanese); 和華川 (Japanese)

Location
- Country: Japan

Physical characteristics
- Source
  - location: Mount Waga, Ōu Mountains, Iwate
  - elevation: 1,200 m (3,900 ft)
- Mouth: Kitakami, Iwate
  - location: Kitakami River
  - coordinates: 39°16′15″N 141°07′24″E
  - elevation: 52 m (171 ft)
- Length: 75.3 km (46.8 mi)
- Basin size: 952 km^{2} (368 sq mi)

The Waga River (和賀川, Waga-gawa) is a river in Iwate Prefecture, Japan. From its headwaters near Mt. Waga in the Ōu Mountains it flows from north to south through the entire length of Nishiwaga Town before turning east through Kitakami City. The River enters the Kitakami River on the south side of the city opposite Mt. Otoko.

The headwaters of both the Waga River and its major tributary the Geto River (夏油川, Geto-gawa) are located in geologically active areas that provide hot springs for numerous onsen. Located at the head of the Geto River is Geto Onsen and Geto Ski Area, both popular attractions.

== History ==
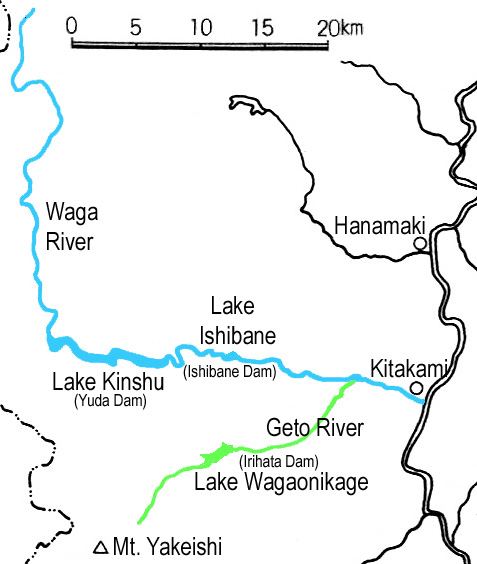
The Waga River and its tributary Geto River in Iwate Prefecture

In prehistoric times the Waga River valley was occupied by the Jōmon people whose artifacts can be found in many places. One of the more famous sites is at Kunenbashi (九年橋, Kunenbashi) where the Waga River meets the Kitakami River. Stone "swords", tablets and tools as well as clay figurines, earrings, potsherds and even a shark's tooth were found from the Final Jōmon Period (1,300 - 300 BC). A number of Pleistocene fossil beds have also been found in the lower terrace of the river.

In 1945 a small prisoner of war camp was established on the south side of the river in the area now known as Lake Kinshu. In the same year a small aircraft factory was built in some caves on the north side of the river near the Ishibane Dam.

Ishibane Dam was completed in just two years in 1954 on the Waga River in western Kitakami. While this construction was underway in 1953 work started upriver on the Yuda Dam in the town of Nishiwaga. It was completed in 1964 creating a much larger reservoir, Lake Kinshu (錦秋湖, Kinshū-ko). On the Geto River construction of the Irihata Dam lasted from 1974 to 1990.

== Ecology ==
The Waga River is one of the few places where the endemic willow species Salix hukaoana is found.

== Gallery ==
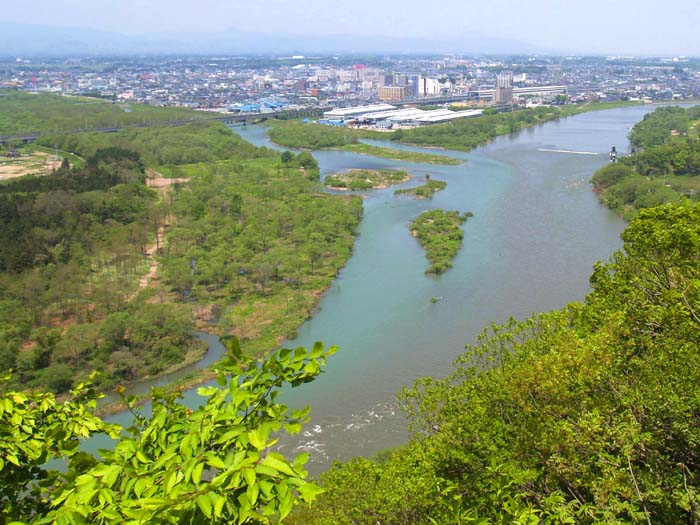
The Waga River (left) empties into the Kitakami River on the south side of Kitakami City. View from Otoko-yama

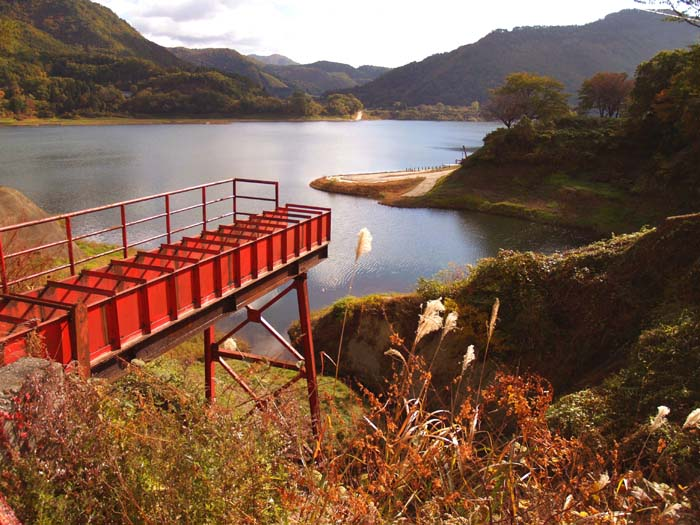
Lake Kinshu as seen from near the JR Hottoyuda train station
