= Ohsawa Dam =

Ohsawa Dam may refer to:

- Ohsawa Dam (Hokkaido)
- Ohsawa Dam (Iwate)
