= Neishi =

Neishi may refer to:

- Mount Neishi in Japan
- Neishi Dam in Japan
- Neishi, a village in Shizi, Pingtung, Taiwan
- Neishi railway station in Taiwan
