= Tono Dam =

Tono Dam may refer to:

- Tono Dam (Ghana)
- Tono Dam (Iwate), Japan
