= Toyosawa Dam =

ToyosawaDam
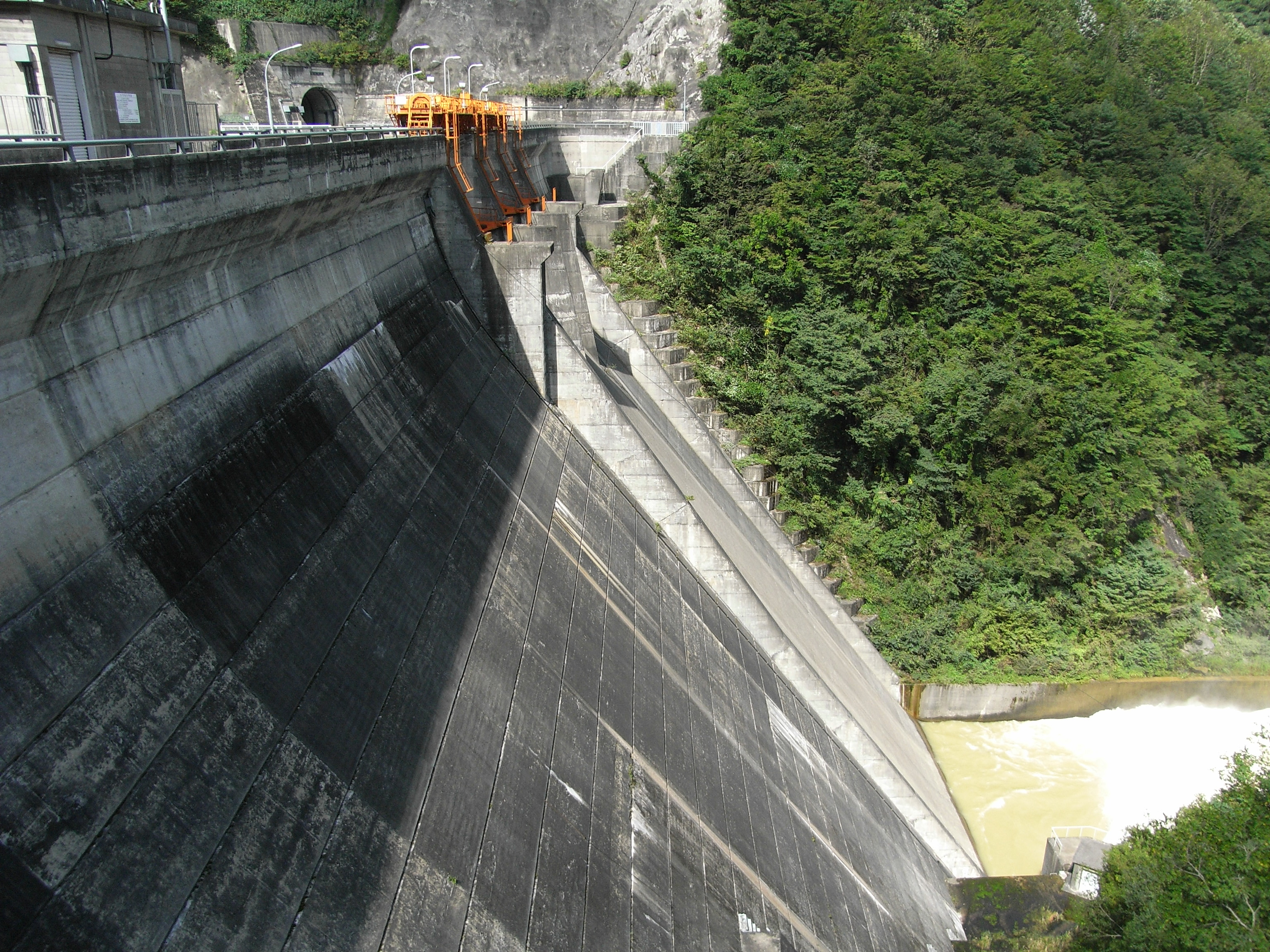

- Location within Japan
- Official name: 豊沢ダム
- Location: Iwate Prefecture, Japan
- Coordinates: 39°28′50″N 140°58′28″E
- Construction began: 1949
- Opening date: 1961
- Operator: Iwate Prefecture

Dam and spillways
- Impounds: Toyosawa River
- Height: 59.1 m (194 ft)
- Length: 150.0 m (492.1 ft)

Reservoir
- Creates: Toyosawa Lake
- Total capacity: 23,356,000 m3
- Catchment area: 60 km2
- Surface area: 136 hectares (340 acres)

The Toyosawa Dam (豊沢ダム, Toyosawa damu) is a dam on the Toyosawa River, a tributary of the Kitakami River system, located in the southern portion of the city of Hanamaki, Iwate Prefecture in the Tōhoku region of northern Japan. It was completed in 1961.

== History ==
The need for storage reservoirs in the Kitakami River valley for irrigation purposes was recognized by the Meiji government at the start of the 20th century, due to repeated crop failures and conflicts between various communities over water rights. The river also suffered from severe environmental problems with acidic runoff from upstream mining operations. Plans for a series of dams was initiated in 1941 by the Ministry of Agriculture and Forestry, but all work was halted during World War II. The plan was revived after the war, and the Toyosawa Dam was the third to be constructed (after the Sannōkai Dam and the Gandō Dam). Construction was begun in 1949, and completed in 1961 by the Kajima Corporation.

== Design ==
The Toyosawa Dam was designed as a solid core concrete gravity dam with a central spillway.
