= Nishiwaga =

Nishiwaga 西和賀町
- Town
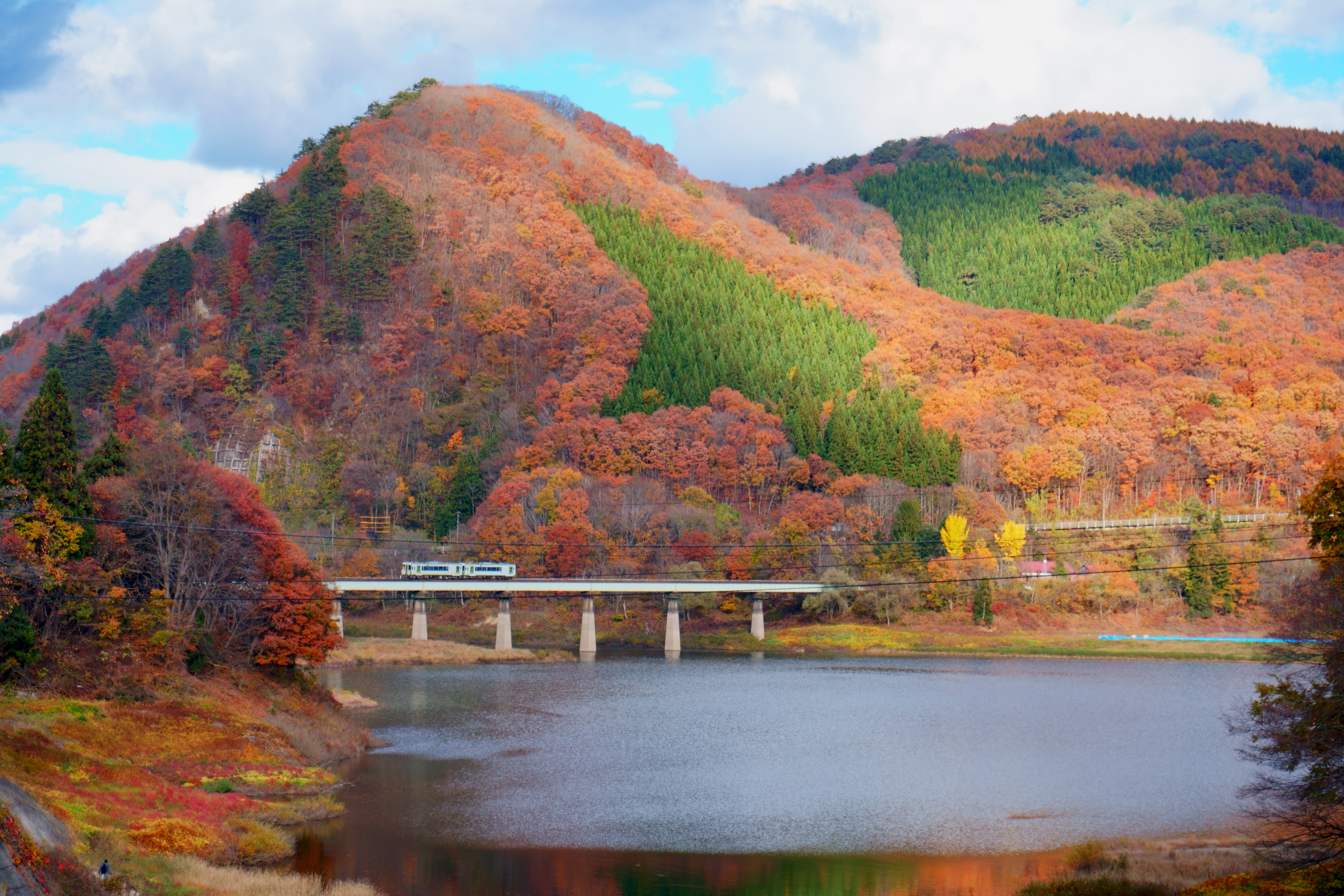
- Kitakami Line

- Flag Seal
- Location of Nishiwaga in Iwate Prefecture
- Coordinates: 39°26′4.5″N 140°45′0.1″E
- Country: Japan
- Region: Tōhoku
- Prefecture: Iwate
- District: Waga

Area
  - Total: 590.74 km^{2} (228.09 sq mi)

Population (March 31, 2020)
  - Total: 5,468
  - Density: 9.256/km^{2} (23.97/sq mi)
- Time zone: UTC+9 (Japan Standard Time)
- City symbols
  - Tree: Buna
  - Flower: Katakuri
  - Bird: Copper pheasant
- Phone number: 0197-82-2111
- Address: Kawajiri 40-jiwari 40-71, Nishiwaga-machi, Waga-gun, Iwate 029-5512
- Website: Official website

Nishiwaga (西和賀町, Nishiwaga-machi) is a town in Iwate Prefecture, Japan. As of 31 March 2020, the town had an estimated population of 5,468 in 2279 households, and a population density of 9 persons per km². The total area of the town is 590.74 square kilometres (228.09 sq mi). The total area was 825.97 square kilometres (318.91 sq mi).

== Geography ==
Nishiwaga is located in the far southwestern corner of Iwate Prefecture, in the river valley of the Waga River, surrounded by the 1000-meter peaks of the Ōu Mountains on three sides. The area is noted for its extremely heavy snowfall in winter. The Yuda Dam is located in Nishiwaga and the Yuda Onsenkyō Prefectural Natural Park is located completely within its borders.

=== Neighboring municipalities ===
Akita Prefecture

- Daisen
- Higashinaruse
- Misato
- Semboku
- Yokote

Iwate Prefecture

- Hanamaki
- Kitakami
- Ōshū
- Shizukuishi

=== Climate ===
Nishiwaga has a humid continental climate (Köppen Dfa) characterized by mild summers and cold winters with heavy snowfall. The average annual temperature in Nishiwaga is 8.9 °C. The average annual rainfall is 1561 mm with September as the wettest month and February as the driest month. The temperatures are highest on average in August, at around 21.3 °C, and lowest in January, at around -4.1 °C.

== Demographics ==
Per Japanese census data, the population of Nishiwaga has declined over the past 60 years and is now less than half of what it was a century ago.

Historical population
Year	Pop.	±%
1920	12,120	—
1930	15,320	+26.4%
1940	16,483	+7.6%
1950	18,682	+13.3%
1960	19,364	+3.7%
1970	12,667	−34.6%
1980	9,989	−21.1%
1990	8,973	−10.2%
2000	7,375	−17.8%
2010	6,601	−10.5%
2020	5,134	−22.2%

== History ==
Waga District was under the control of the Nanbu clan of Morioka Domain during the Edo period. The villages of Yuda and Sawauchi were established with the Meiji period establishment of the modern municipalities system on April 1, 1889. Yuda was elevated to town status on August 1, 1964.

Nishiwaga was founded on November 1, 2005 from the merger of the town of Yuda and the village of Sawauchi. This merger occurred under pressure from the national government of Japan and in the face of steady but significant depopulating trends in rural Japan in general. The new town's name came as the result of a competition open to entries from all residents of the former Yuda Town and Sawauchi Village, in preparation for the merger. The final decision was made by a vote of representatives from both municipalities. The chosen name, literally "West-Waga Town," reflects the status of the new town as comprising the western portion of Waga District.

== Government ==
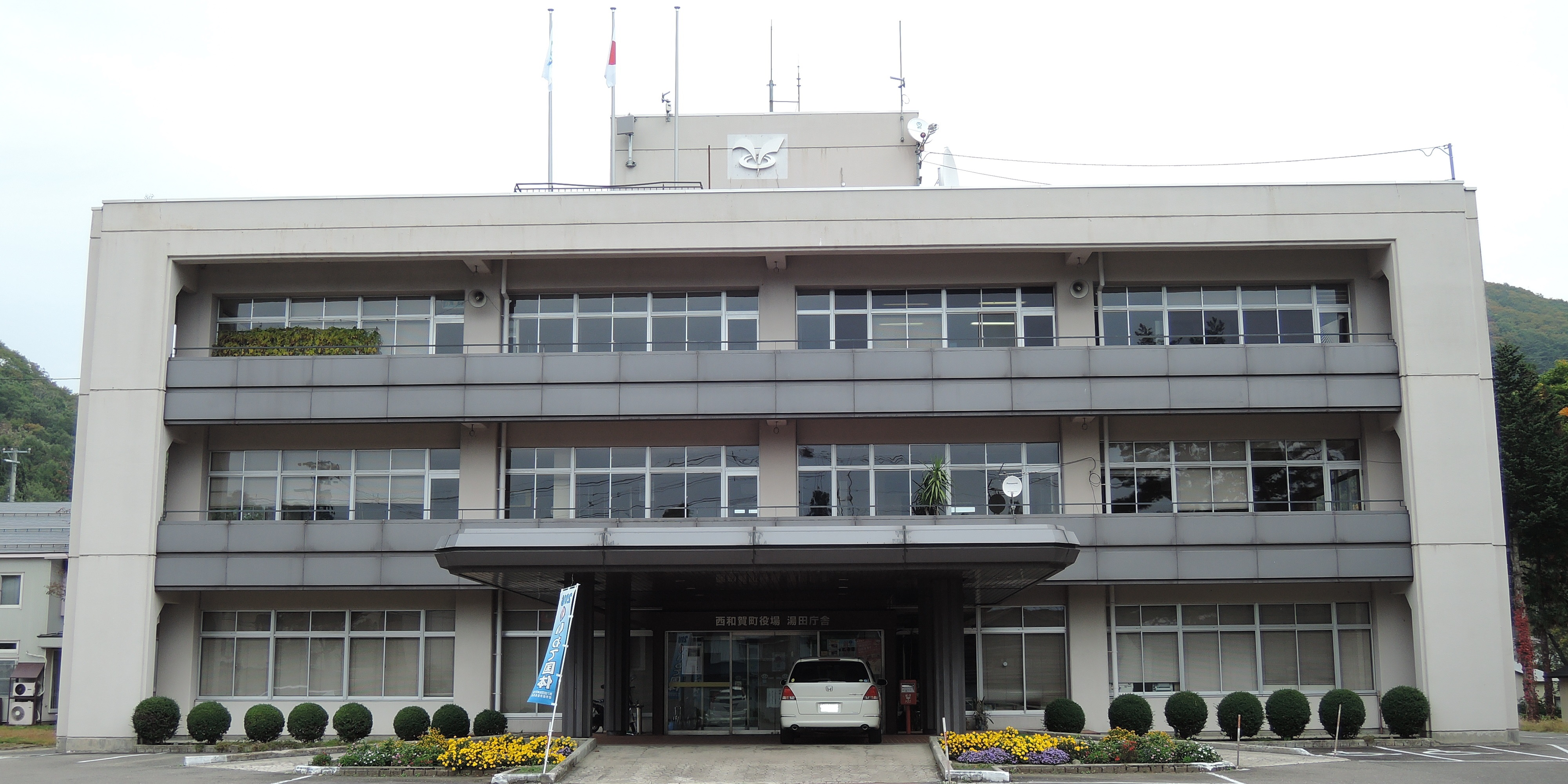
Nishiwaga Town Hall

Nishiwaga has a mayor-council form of government with a directly elected mayor and a unicameral town council of 12 members. Nishiwaga and the city of Nishiwaga Kitakami contribute four seats to the Iwate Prefectural legislature. In terms of national politics, the town is part of Iwate 3rd district of the lower house of the Diet of Japan.

== Economy ==
The local economy is based on agriculture and forestry, and seasonal tourism.

== Education ==
Nishiwaga has two public elementary schools and two public junior high schools operated by the town government, and one public high school operated by the Iwate Prefectural Board of Education.

== Transportation ==
=== Railway ===
East Japan Railway Company (JR East) - Kitakami Line

- Yudakinshūko - Hottoyuda

=== Highway ===
- Akita Expressway – Kitakami IC, Kitakami-Nishi IC
- National Route 107

== Local attractions ==
Nishiwaga has many natural onsen hot springs ("yukko" in the local dialect). There are several natural hot springs baths operated by the municipality, and inexpensive monthly passes are available to residents. There is also a hot spring heated sand bath ("suna-yukko") at one of the sites. Many traditional bed and breakfast inns operate in these areas, usually with their own private hot spring facilities, some of which are open to day visitors for a fee.

The area is also home to rare old-growth beech forests found in few other places in Japan.

The Waga River, a major tributary of the Kitakami River and from which the county and current town derive their names, originates high up in the folds of Waga-dake, a 1,440 metres (4,720 ft) peak along the Ou Range which forms the prefectural boundary between Iwate Prefecture (on the eastern, Nishiwaga side) and Akita Prefecture (to the west).

The mountains of Nishiwaga Town have drawn interest from local hikers and outdoors enthusiasts, as well as hikers and ecotourists from as far away as Tokyo. In the southeastern section of Nishiwaga Town the Waga River is restrained by the Yuda Dam, which creates a variable depth man-made lake called Kinshu Lake.
