= Yuda Onsenkyō Prefectural Natural Park =

Natural park of Iwate prefecture, Japan

- 湯田温泉郷県立自然公園
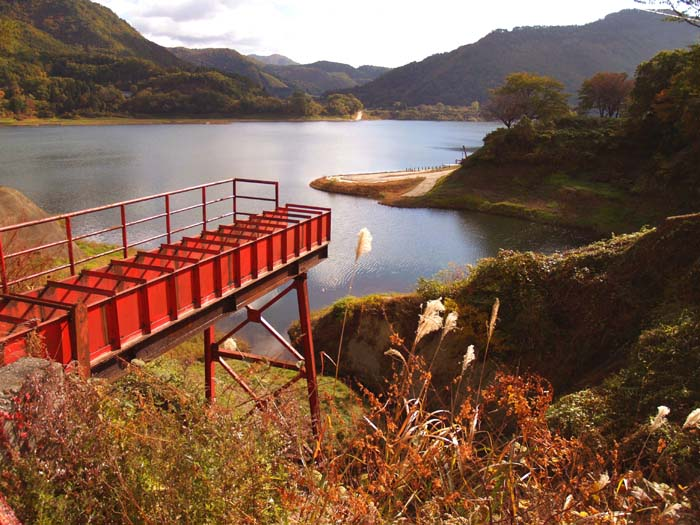
- Lake Kinshu

- Location within Iwate Prefecture Location within Japan
- Location: Iwate Prefecture, Japan
- Nearest city: Nishiwaga
- Coordinates: 39°20′26″N 140°47′23″E
- Area: 15.34 km^{2} (5.92 sq mi)
- Established: 8 May 1961

Yuda Onsenkyō Prefectural Natural Park (湯田温泉郷県立自然公園, Yuda Onsenkyō kenritsu shizen kōen) is a Prefectural Natural Park in Iwate Prefecture, Japan. Established in 1961, the park is wholly within the town of Nishiwaga. It encompasses the area around Lake Kinshu reservoir created by Yuda Dam and nearby hot spring resorts

== See also ==
- National Parks of Japan
