= Tsunatori Dam =

Dam in Iwate Prefecture, Japan

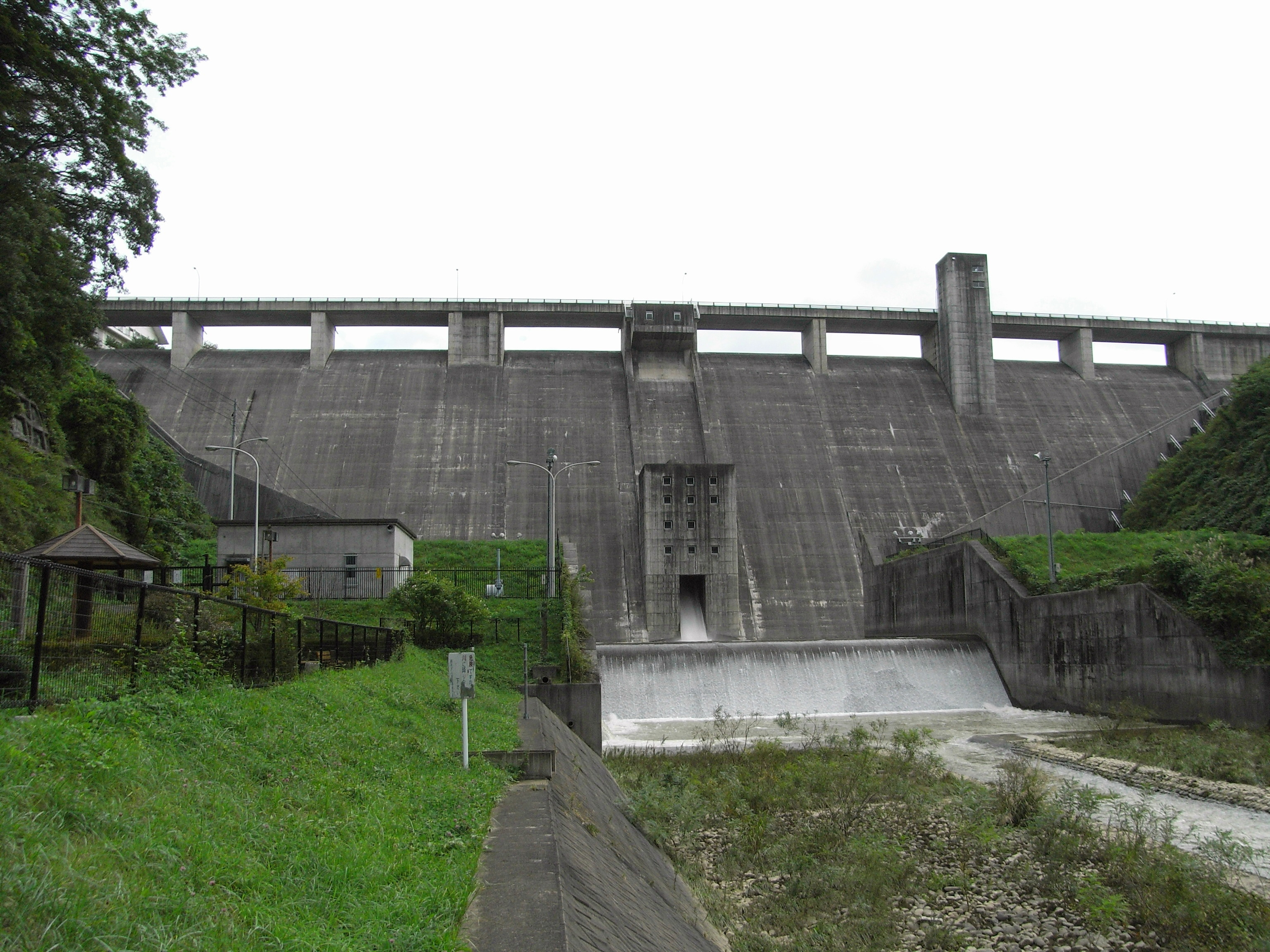

- Location within Japan
- Official name: 綱取ダム
- Location: Iwate Prefecture, Japan
- Coordinates: 39°42′40″N 141°12′17″E
- Construction began: 1972
- Opening date: 1982

Dam and spillways
- Height: 59 m (194 ft)
- Length: 247 m (810 ft)

Reservoir
- Total capacity: 15,000,000 m^{3} (530,000,000 cu ft)
- Catchment area: 83 km^{2} (32 sq mi)
- Surface area: 79 hectares (200 acres)

Tsunatori Dam (Japanese: 綱取ダム) is a gravity dam located in Iwate Prefecture in Japan. The dam is used for flood control and water supply. The dam has a catchment area of 83 km², impounds approximately 79 ha of land when full, and can store 15,000 thousand cubic meters of water. Construction began in 1972 and was completed in 1982.

== See also ==
- List of dams in Japan
