= Koromogawa No.1 Dam =

Dam in Iwate Prefecture, Japan

- Location within Japan
- Official name: 衣川１号ダム
- Location: Iwate Prefecture, Japan
- Coordinates: 39°6′00″N 140°57′58″E
- Opening date: 1963

Dam and spillways
- Height: 35.5 m (116 ft)
- Length: 212 m (696 ft)

Reservoir
- Total capacity: 2970 thousand cubic meters
- Catchment area: 29 sq. km
- Surface area: 27 hectares

Koromogawa No.1 Dam (Japanese: 衣川１号ダム) is an earthfill dam located in Iwate Prefecture in Japan. The dam is used for flood control and irrigation. The catchment area of the dam is 29 km^{2}. The dam impounds about 27 ha of land when full and can store 2970 thousand cubic meters of water. The construction of the dam was completed in 1963.

== See also ==
- List of dams in Japan
