= Oshuku Dam =

Dam in Iwate Prefecture, Japan

- Location within Japan
- Official name: 鴬宿ダム
- Location: Iwate Prefecture, Japan
- Coordinates: 39°36′50″N 140°53′37″E
- Opening date: 1957

Dam and spillways
- Height: 17.5 m (57 ft)
- Length: 67 m (220 ft)

Reservoir
- Total capacity: 1,793,000 m^{3} (63,300,000 cu ft)
- Catchment area: 14.8 km^{2} (5.7 sq mi)
- Surface area: 23 hectares (57 acres)

Oshuku Dam (Japanese: 鴬宿ダム) is a gravity dam located in Iwate Prefecture in Japan. The dam is used for flood control and irrigation. The catchment area of the dam is 14.8 km^{2}. The dam impounds about 23 ha of land when full and can store 1793 thousand cubic meters of water. The construction of the dam was completed in 1957.

== See also ==
- List of dams in Japan
