= Yanagawa Dam (Iwate) =

Dam in Iwate Prefecture, Japan

- Location within Japan
- Official name: 簗川ダム
- Location: Iwate Prefecture, Japan
- Coordinates: 39°40′22″N 141°15′46″E
- Construction began: 1978

Dam and spillways
- Height: 77.2 m (253 ft)
- Length: 242.7 m (796 ft)

Reservoir
- Total capacity: 19,100,000 m^{3} (670,000,000 cu ft)
- Catchment area: 117.2 km^{2} (45.3 sq mi)
- Surface area: 97 hectares (240 acres)

Yanagawa Dam (Japanese: 簗川ダム) is a gravity dam located in Iwate Prefecture in Japan. The dam is used for flood control, water supply and power production. The catchment area of the dam is 117.2 km^{2}. The dam impounds about 97 ha of land when full and can store 19100 thousand cubic meters of water. The construction of the dam was started on 1978.

== See also ==
- List of dams in Japan
