= Hinata Dam =

Dam in Iwate Prefecture, Japan

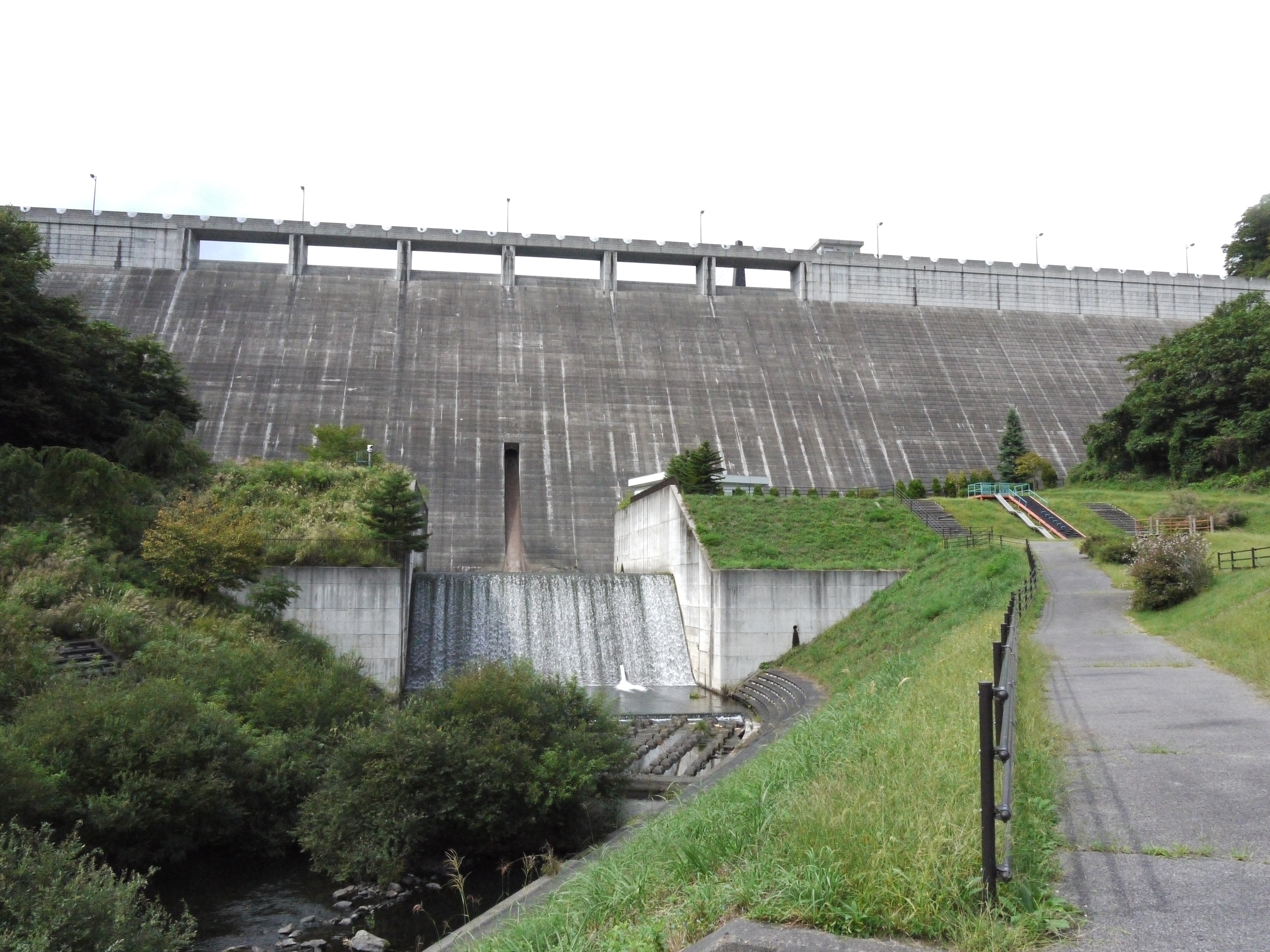

- Location within Japan
- Interactive map of Hinata Dam
- Official name: 日向ダム
- Location: Iwate Prefecture, Japan
- Coordinates: 39°17′34″N 141°47′51″E
- Construction began: 1981
- Opening date: 1997

Dam and spillways
- Height: 56.5 m (185 ft)
- Length: 290 m (950 ft)

Reservoir
- Total capacity: 5700 thousand cubic meters
- Catchment area: 22 sq. km
- Surface area: 29 hectares

Hinata Dam (Japanese: 日向ダム) is a gravity dam located in Iwate Prefecture in Japan. The dam is used for flood control. The catchment area of the dam is 22 km^{2}. The dam impounds about 29 ha of land when full and can store 5700 thousand cubic meters of water. The construction of the dam was started on 1981 and completed in 1997.

== See also ==
- List of dams in Japan
