= Taki Dam (Iwate) =

Dam in Iwate Prefecture, Japan

- Location within Japan
- Official name: 滝ダム
- Location: Iwate Prefecture, Japan
- Coordinates: 40°9′05″N 141°43′24″E
- Construction began: 1969
- Opening date: 1982

Dam and spillways
- Height: 70 m (230 ft)
- Length: 187 m (614 ft)

Reservoir
- Total capacity: 7,600,000 m^{3} (270,000,000 cu ft)
- Catchment area: 152.6 km^{2} (58.9 sq mi)
- Surface area: 34 hectares (84 acres)

Taki Dam (Japanese: 滝ダム) is a gravity dam located in Iwate Prefecture in Japan. The dam is used for flood control and power production. The catchment area of the dam is 152.6 km^{2}. The dam impounds about 34 ha of land when full and can store 7600 thousand cubic meters of water. The construction of the dam was started on 1969 and completed in 1982.

== See also ==
- List of dams in Japan
