= Rentaki Dam =

Dam in Iwate Prefecture, Japan

- Location within Japan
- Official name: レン滝ダム
- Location: Iwate Prefecture, Japan
- Coordinates: 39°34′10″N 140°54′46″E
- Opening date: 1968

Dam and spillways
- Height: 37.7 m (124 ft)
- Length: 170 m (560 ft)

Reservoir
- Total capacity: 1,869,000 m^{3} (66,000,000 cu ft)
- Catchment area: 14.1 km^{2} (5.4 sq mi)
- Surface area: 23 hectares (57 acres)

Rentaki Dam (Japanese: レン滝ダム) is a gravity dam located in Iwate Prefecture in Japan. The dam is used for flood control. The catchment area of the dam is 14.1 km^{2}. The dam impounds about 23 ha of land when full and can store 1869 thousand cubic meters of water. The construction of the dam was completed in 1968.

== See also ==
- List of dams in Japan
