= Ishibuchi Dam =

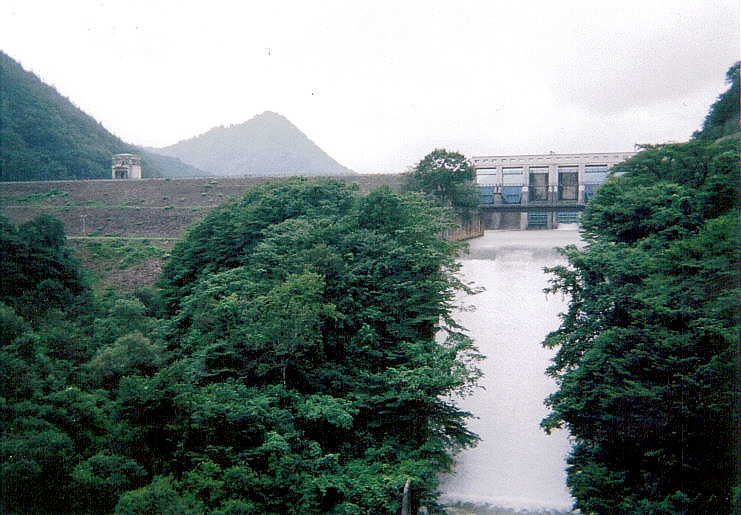

- Location within Iwate Prefecture Location within Japan
- Location: Ōshū, Iwate, Japan
- Coordinates: 39°06′48″N 140°54′13″E
- Construction began: 1945
- Opening date: 1953
- Owner: Ministry of Land, Infrastructure, Transport and Tourism

Dam and spillways
- Type of dam: Embankment, rock-fill
- Impounds: Isawa River
- Height: 53 m (174 ft)
- Length: 345 m (1,132 ft)
- Dam volume: 443,000 m^{3} (579,000 cu yd)

Reservoir
- Total capacity: 16,150,000 m^{3} (13,090 acre⋅ft)
- Catchment area: 154 km^{2} (59 mi^{2})
- Surface area: 108 ha (270 acres)

Power Station
- Installed capacity: 20,800 KW

Ishibuchi Dam (石淵ダム) was an embankment dam on the Isawa River in the city of Ōshū, Iwate, Japan, constructed between 1945 and 1953. It was submerged by the reservoir of the taller and larger Isawa Dam downstream in 2013.
