= Salix hukaoana =

Scientific classification
- Kingdom: Plantae
- Clade: Tracheophytes
- Clade: Angiosperms
- Clade: Eudicots
- Clade: Rosids
- Order: Malpighiales
- Family: Salicaceae
- Genus: Salix
- Species: S. hukaoana

Binomial name
- Salix hukaoana Kimura

Species of tree

Salix hukaoana (ユビソヤナギ, Yubiso-yanagi) is a species of willow endemic to the Kantō and Tōhoku regions of Honshū, Japan.

== Taxonomy ==
The species was first described by Japanese botanist Arika Kimura in 1973. The specific epithet honours Shigemitsu Fukao, who discovered the tree the previous year growing along the Yubiso River, a tributary of the upper Tone River, in Gunma Prefecture.

== Description ==
Salix hukaoana is a deciduous tree that grows to a height of some 15 metres (49 ft).

== Conservation status ==
Salix hukaoana is classed as Vulnerable on the Ministry of the Environment Red List.
