= Kanagoezawa Dam =

Dam in Iwate Prefecture, Japan

- Location within Japan
- Interactive map of Kanagoezawa Dam
- Official name: 金越沢ダム
- Location: Iwate Prefecture, Japan
- Coordinates: 38°50′35″N 141°23′36″E
- Construction began: 1979
- Opening date: 2004

Dam and spillways
- Height: 43 m (141 ft)
- Length: 338 m (1,109 ft)

Reservoir
- Total capacity: 1160 thousand cubic meters
- Catchment area: 3.7 sq. km
- Surface area: 14 hectares

Kanagoezawa Dam (Japanese: 金越沢ダム) is a rockfill dam located in Iwate Prefecture in Japan. The dam is used for irrigation. The catchment area of the dam is 3.7 km^{2}. The dam impounds about 14 ha of land when full and can store 1160 thousand cubic meters of water. The construction of the dam was started on 1979 and completed in 2004.

== See also ==
- List of dams in Japan
