= Tono No.2 Dam =

Dam in Iwate Prefecture, Japan

- Location within Japan
- Official name: 遠野第二ダム
- Location: Iwate Prefecture, Japan
- Coordinates: 39°19′07″N 141°31′47″E
- Construction began: 1990
- Opening date: 2010

Dam and spillways
- Height: 23.1 m (76 ft)
- Length: 87.5 m (287 ft)

Reservoir
- Total capacity: 248,000 m^{3} (8,800,000 cu ft)
- Catchment area: 33.5 km^{2} (12.9 sq mi)
- Surface area: 8 hectares (20 acres)

Tono No.2 Dam (Japanese: 遠野第二ダム) is a gravity dam located in Iwate Prefecture in Japan. The dam is used for flood control. The catchment area of the dam is 33.5 km^{2}. The dam impounds about 8 ha of land when full and can store 248 thousand cubic meters of water. The construction of the dam was started on 1990 and completed in 2010.

== See also ==
- List of dams in Japan
