= Koromogawa No.2 Dam =

Dam in Iwate Prefecture, Japan

- Location within Japan
- Official name: 衣川２号ダム
- Location: Iwate Prefecture, Japan
- Coordinates: 39°0′14″N 141°0′46″E
- Opening date: 1971

Dam and spillways
- Height: 34 m (112 ft)
- Length: 251 m (823 ft)

Reservoir
- Total capacity: 2360 thousand cubic meters
- Catchment area: 39 sq. km
- Surface area: 25 hectares

Koromogawa No.2 Dam (Japanese: 衣川２号ダム) is a gravity concrete & fill dam (compound) dam located in Iwate Prefecture in Japan. The dam is used for flood control. The catchment area of the dam is 39 km^{2}. The dam impounds about 25 ha of land when full and can store 2360 thousand cubic meters of water. The construction of the dam was completed in 1971.

== See also ==
- List of dams in Japan
