= Yukiyagawa Dam =

Dam in Iwate Prefecture, Japan

- Location within Japan
- Official name: 雪谷川ダム
- Location: Iwate Prefecture, Japan
- Coordinates: 40°17′28″N 141°30′59″E
- Construction began: 1967
- Opening date: 1977

Dam and spillways
- Height: 28.4 m (93 ft)
- Length: 107.3 m (352 ft)

Reservoir
- Total capacity: 2,662,000 m^{3} (94,000,000 cu ft)
- Catchment area: 70.9 km^{2} (27.4 sq mi)
- Surface area: 41 hectares (100 acres)

Yukiyagawa Dam (Japanese: 雪谷川ダム) is a gravity dam located in Iwate Prefecture in Japan. The dam is used for flood control and irrigation. The catchment area of the dam is 70.9 km^{2}. The dam impounds about 41 ha of land when full and can store 2662 thousand cubic meters of water. The construction of the dam was started on 1967 and completed in 1977.

== See also ==
- List of dams in Japan
