= Tokitosawa Tameike Dam =

Dam in Iwate Prefecture, Japan

Tokitosawa Tameike
- Location within Japan
- Official name: 時戸沢溜池
- Location: Iwate Prefecture, Japan
- Coordinates: 39°20′24″N 140°57′52″E
- Opening date: 1988

Dam and spillways
- Height: 16 m (52 ft)
- Length: 105 m (344 ft)

Reservoir
- Total capacity: 54,000 m^{3} (1,900,000 cu ft)
- Surface area: 2 hectares (4.9 acres)

Tokitosawa Tameike (Japanese: 時戸沢溜池) is an earthfill dam located in Iwate Prefecture in Japan. The dam is used for irrigation. The dam impounds about 2 ha of land when full and can store 54 thousand cubic meters of water. The construction of the dam was completed in 1988.

== See also ==
- List of dams in Japan
