= Tako Dam =

Dam in Iwate Prefecture, Japan

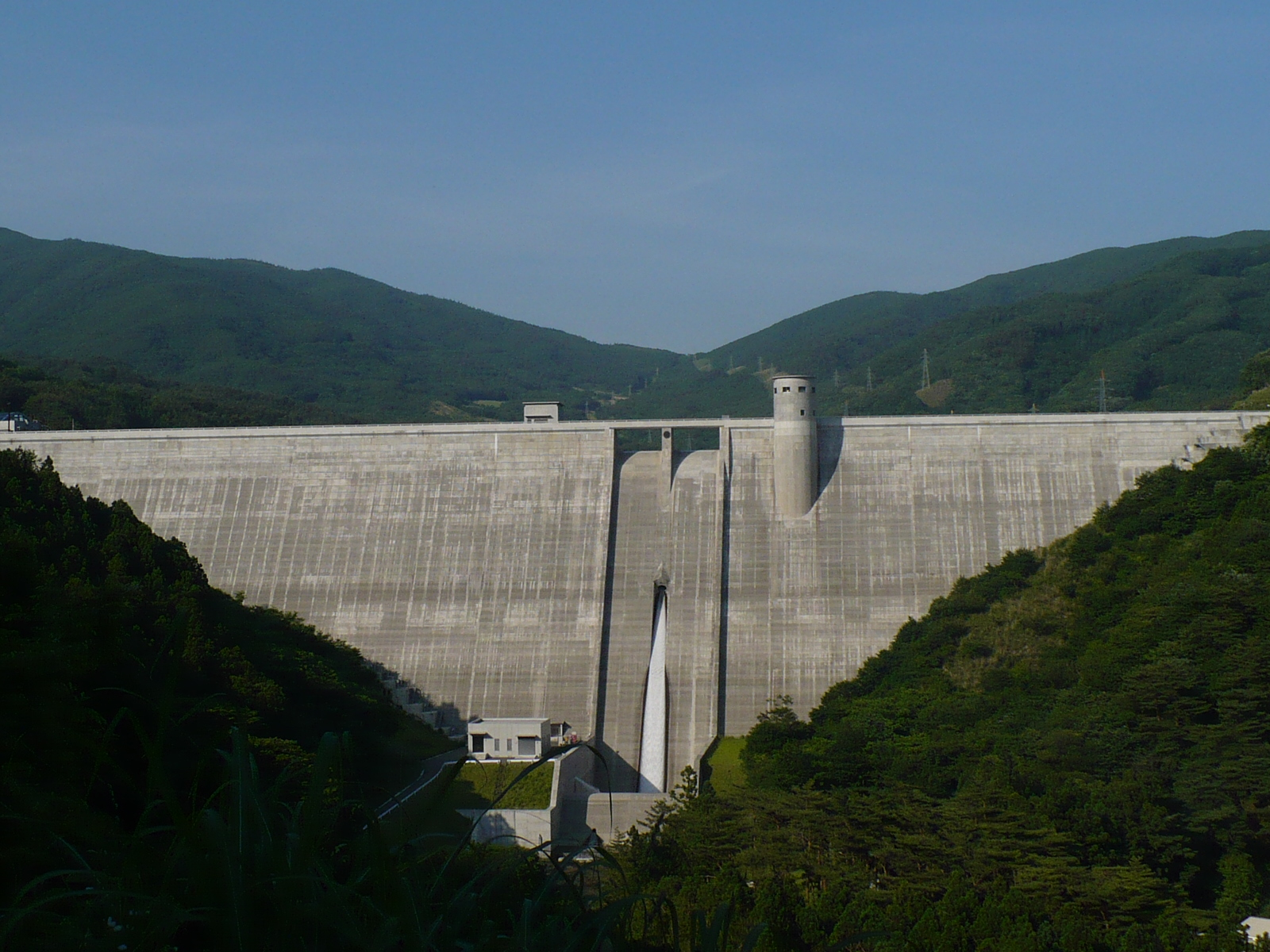

- Location within Japan
- Official name: 鷹生ダム
- Location: Iwate Prefecture, Japan
- Coordinates: 39°9′20″N 141°42′07″E
- Construction began: 1985
- Opening date: 2006

Dam and spillways
- Height: 77 m (253 ft)
- Length: 322 m (1,056 ft)

Reservoir
- Total capacity: 9,680,000 m^{3} (342,000,000 cu ft)
- Catchment area: 17 km^{2} (6.6 sq mi)
- Surface area: 39 hectares (96 acres)

Tako Dam (Japanese: 鷹生ダム) is a gravity dam located in Iwate Prefecture in Japan. The dam is used for flood control and water supply. The catchment area of the dam is 17 km^{2}. The dam impounds about 39 ha of land when full and can store 9680 thousand cubic meters of water. The construction of the dam was started on 1985 and completed in 2006.

== See also ==
- List of dams in Japan
