= Fudai Dam =

Dam in Iwate Prefecture, Japan

- Location within Japan
- Interactive map of Fudai Dam
- Official name: 普代ダム
- Location: Iwate Prefecture, Japan
- Coordinates: 39°59′49″N 141°54′09″E
- Construction began: 1982
- Opening date: 1997

Dam and spillways
- Height: 37.3 m (122 ft)
- Length: 97 m (318 ft)

Reservoir
- Total capacity: 1130 thousand cubic meters
- Catchment area: 6.6 sq. km
- Surface area: 13 hectares

Fudai Dam (Japanese: 普代ダム) is a gravity dam located in Iwate Prefecture in Japan. The dam is used for irrigation. The catchment area of the dam is 6.6 km^{2}. The dam impounds about 13 ha of land when full and can store 1130 thousand cubic meters of water. The construction of the dam was started on 1982 and completed in 1997.

== See also ==
- List of dams in Japan
