= Sotoyama Dam =

Dam in Iwate Prefecture, Japan

- Location within Japan
- Official name: 外山ダム
- Location: Iwate Prefecture, Japan
- Coordinates: 39°46′32″N 141°17′01″E
- Construction began: 1941
- Opening date: 1943

Dam and spillways
- Height: 33 m (108 ft)
- Length: 121 m (397 ft)

Reservoir
- Total capacity: 3,751,000 m^{3} (132,500,000 cu ft)
- Catchment area: 32.7 km^{2} (12.6 sq mi)
- Surface area: 49 hectares (120 acres)

Sotoyama Dam (Japanese: 外山ダム) is a gravity dam located in Iwate Prefecture in Japan. The dam is used for power production. The catchment area of the dam is 32.7 km^{2}. The dam impounds about 49 ha of land when full and can store 3751 thousand cubic meters of water. The construction of the dam was started on 1941 and completed in 1943.

== See also ==
- List of dams in Japan
