= Isawa Dam =

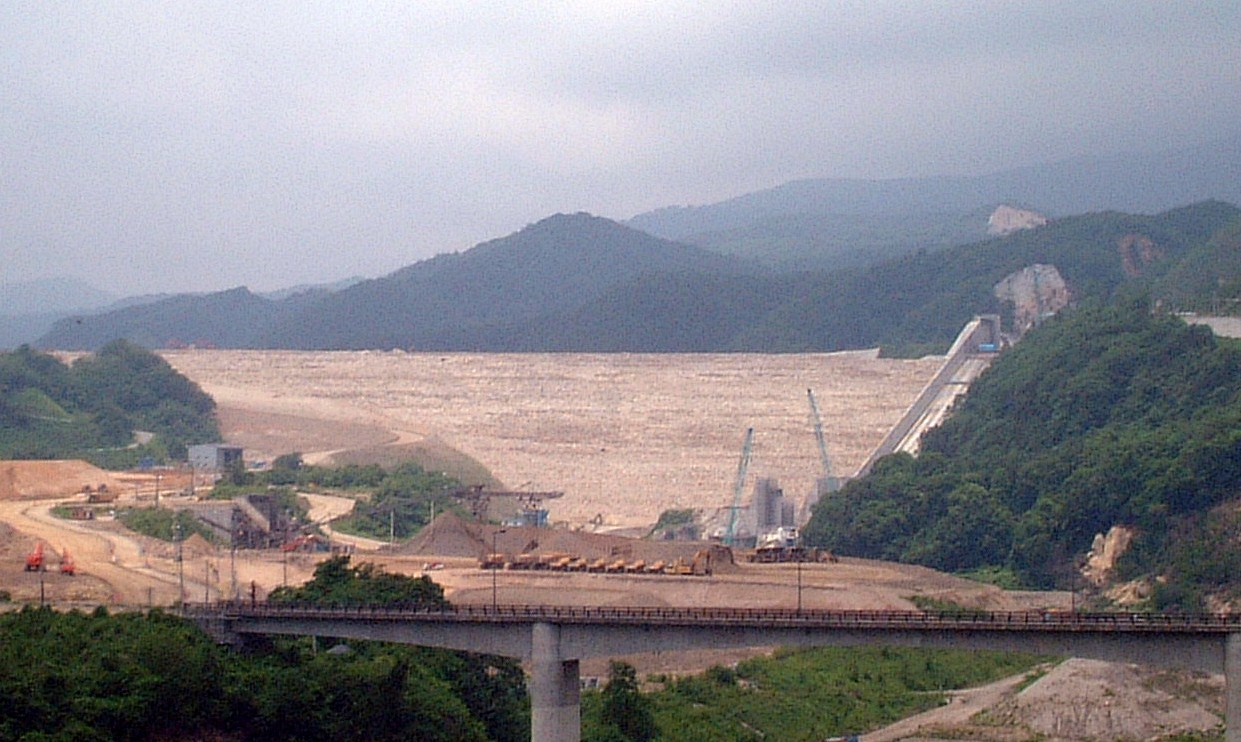

- Location within Japan
- Location: Iwate Prefecture, Japan
- Coordinates: 39°06′48.0″N 140°54′13.0″E
- Purpose: Flood control, power, irrigation
- Construction began: 1983
- Opening date: 2013

Dam and spillways
- Type of dam: Embankment, rock-fill
- Impounds: Isawa River
- Height: 132 m (433 ft)
- Length: 723 m (2,372 ft)
- Dam volume: 13,500,000 m^{3} (17,700,000 cu yd)

Reservoir
- Total capacity: 143,000,000 m^{3} (116,000 acre⋅ft)
- Active capacity: 132,000,000 m^{3} (107,000 acre⋅ft)
- Catchment area: 185 km^{2} (71 mi^{2})
- Surface area: 440 ha (1,100 acres)

Power Station
- Commission date: 2014
- Hydraulic head: 100.7–105.2 m (330–345 ft) (effective)
- Turbines: 1 × 10.7 MW, 1 × 3.5 MW, 1 × 1.5 MW Francis-type
- Installed capacity: 15.7 MW

Isawa Dam (胆沢ダム) is an embankment dam on the Isawa River in Iwate Prefecture, Japan. It was constructed between 1983 and 2013. Its reservoir, which submerged the smaller Ishibuchi Dam upstream, was full in May 2013. The dam's 15.7 MW power station was expected to be operational in July 2014.
