= Iwasaki Nojo Tameike Dam =

Dam in Iwate Prefecture, Japan

- Location within Japan
- Interactive map of Iwasaki Nojo Tameike Dam
- Official name: 岩崎農場溜池
- Location: Iwate Prefecture, Japan
- Coordinates: 39°15′40″N 140°59′14″E
- Opening date: 1938

Dam and spillways
- Height: 24.2 m (79 ft)
- Length: 81.6 m (268 ft)

Reservoir
- Total capacity: 820 thousand cubic meters
- Surface area: 14 hectares

Iwasaki Nojo Tameike Dam (Japanese: 岩崎農場溜池) is an earthfill dam located in Iwate Prefecture in Japan. The dam is used for irrigation. The dam impounds about 14 ha of land when full and can store 820 thousand cubic meters of water. The construction of the dam was completed in 1938.

== See also ==
- List of dams in Japan
