= Gandō Dam =

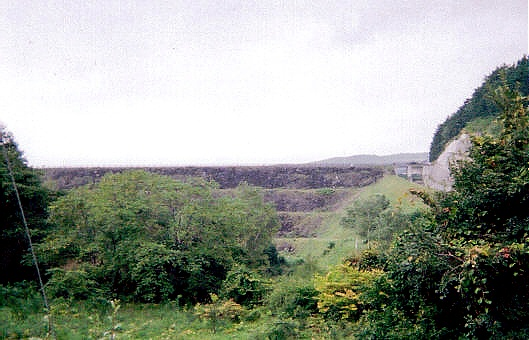

- Location within Japan
- Official name: 岩洞ダム
- Location: Morioka, Iwate, Japan
- Coordinates: 39°49′37″N 141°22′24″E
- Opening date: 1960
- Owner: Iwate Prefecture

Dam and spillways
- Type of dam: Rock-fill dam
- Impounds: Tandogawa River
- Height: 40 m (130 ft)
- Length: 351 m (1,152 ft)
- Dam volume: 850,000 m^{3}

Reservoir
- Creates: Gandō Lake
- Total capacity: 65,600,000 m^{3}
- Catchment area: 211.1 km^{2}
- Surface area: 577 ha

Power Station
- Operator: Iwate Prefecture
- Annual generation: 49,300 KW

Gandō Dam (岩洞ダム, Gandō damu) is a dam on the Tandogawa River, a branch of the Kitakami River in Morioka, Iwate Prefecture, Japan, completed in 1960.

== History ==
The need for storage reservoirs in the Kitakami River valley for irrigation purposes was recognized by the Meiji government at the start of the 20th century, due to repeated crop failures and conflicts between various communities over water rights. The river also suffered from severe environmental problems with acidic runoff from upstream mining operations. Plans for a series of dams was initiated in 1941 by the Ministry of Agriculture and Forestry, but all work was halted during World War II. The plan was revived after the war, and the Gandō Dam was the second to be completed after the Sannōkai Dam.

== Design ==
The Gandō Dam was constructed to provide irrigation water, and also to supply the 41,000 KW Gandō No.1 Hydroelectric Plant and 8,300 KW Gandō No.2 Power Plants. The design of the dam is that of a sloped wall rockfill dam. The dam was completed in 1960 by the Taisei Corporation.

The Gandō Reservoir created by the dam has been stocked with carp and Japanese smelt and is a popular vacation location due to its ease of access via Japan National Route 455.

== Others ==
- In 1971, a working group at Waseda University suggested that the capital should be relocated to the area around Gandō Dam and received a prize from the government.
