= Ohshida Dam =

Dam in Iwate Prefecture, Japan

- Location within Japan
- Official name: 大志田ダム
- Location: Iwate Prefecture, Japan
- Coordinates: 40°5′21″N 141°17′43″E
- Construction began: 1984
- Opening date: 2004

Dam and spillways
- Height: 63.7 m (209 ft)
- Length: 165 m (541 ft)

Reservoir
- Total capacity: 11,300,000 m^{3} (400,000,000 cu ft)
- Catchment area: 75.7 km^{2} (29.2 sq mi)
- Surface area: 91 hectares (220 acres)

Ohshida Dam (Japanese: 大志田ダム) is a gravity dam located in Iwate Prefecture in Japan. The dam is used for irrigation. The catchment area of the dam is 75.7 km^{2}. The dam impounds about 91 ha of land when full and can store 11300 thousand cubic meters of water. The construction of the dam was started on 1984 and completed in 2004.

== See also ==
- List of dams in Japan
