= Setsukinai Dam =

Dam in Iwate Prefecture, Japan

- Location within Japan
- Official name: 瀬月内ダム
- Location: Iwate Prefecture, Japan
- Coordinates: 40°6′50″N 141°29′36″E
- Construction began: 1973
- Opening date: 1987

Dam and spillways
- Height: 38.5 m (126 ft)
- Length: 144.5 m (474 ft)

Reservoir
- Total capacity: 1,250,000 m^{3} (44,000,000 cu ft)
- Catchment area: 11.8 km^{2} (4.6 sq mi)
- Surface area: 13 hectares (32 acres)

Setsukinai Dam (Japanese: 瀬月内ダム) is a rockfill dam located in Iwate Prefecture in Japan. The dam is used for irrigation. The catchment area of the dam is 11.8 km^{2}. The dam impounds about 13 ha of land when full and can store 1250 thousand cubic meters of water. The construction of the dam was started on 1973 and completed in 1987.

== See also ==
- List of dams in Japan
