= Kuzumaru Dam =

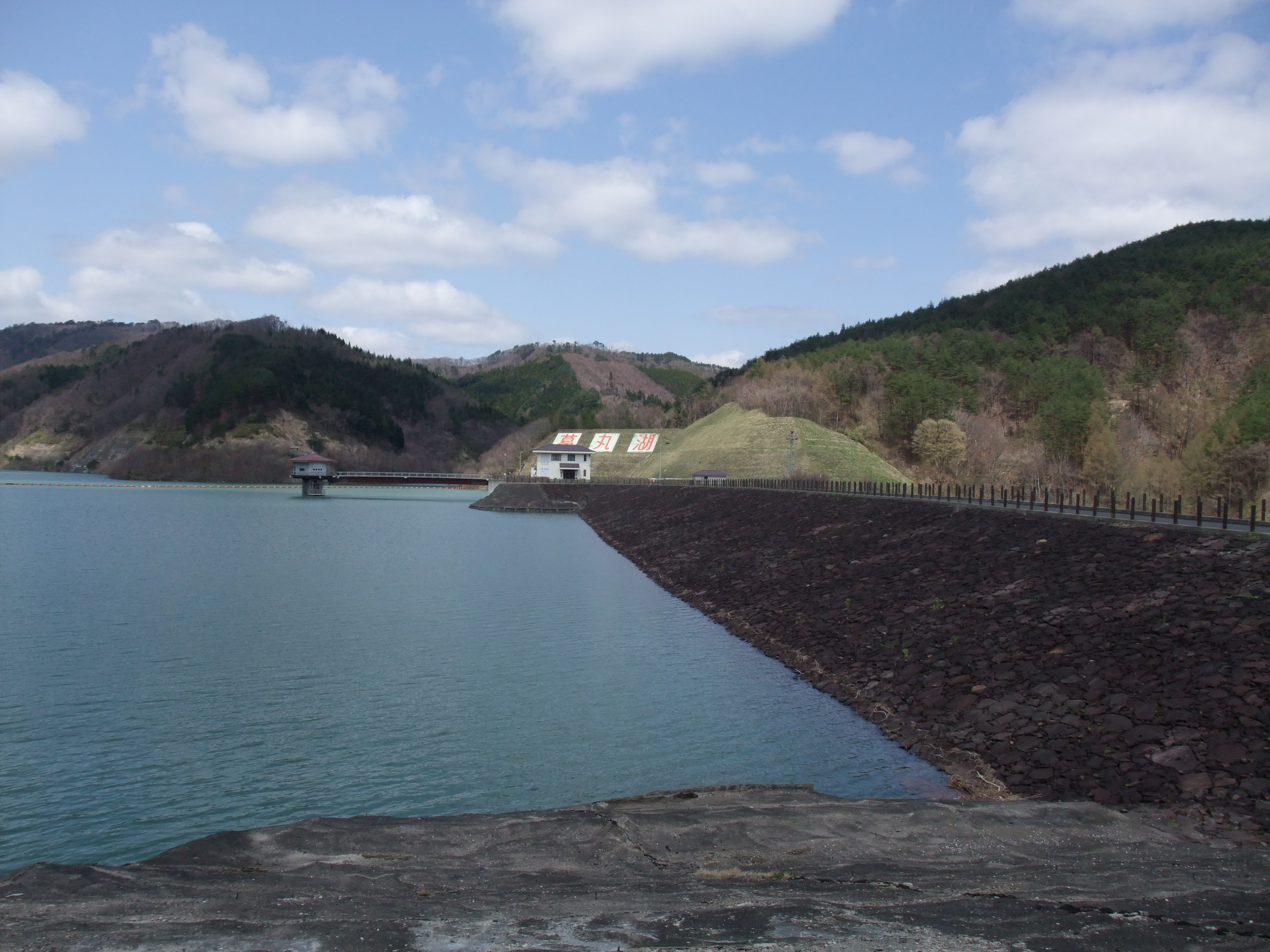

- Location within Japan
- Location: Hanamaki, Iwate, Japan
- Coordinates: 39°30′45″N 141°3′10″E
- Construction began: 1978
- Opening date: 1991

Dam and spillways
- Impounds: Kuzumaru River
- Height: 51.7 m (170 ft)
- Length: 220 m (720 ft)
- Dam volume: 670,000 m^{3}

Reservoir
- Total capacity: 5,000,000 m^{3}
- Catchment area: 22.5 km^{2}
- Surface area: 39 hectares (96 acres)

Kuzumaru Dam (葛丸ダム, Kuzumaru damu) is a dam in Hanamaki, Iwate Prefecture, Japan, completed in 1991.
