= Senganishi Dam =

Dam in Iwate Prefecture, Japan

- Location within Japan
- Official name: 千貫石ダム（再）
- Location: Iwate Prefecture, Japan
- Coordinates: 39°13′29″N 141°0′31″E
- Opening date: 1934

Dam and spillways
- Height: 31.3 m (103 ft)
- Length: 247.5 m (812 ft)

Reservoir
- Total capacity: 5,168,000 m^{3} (182,500,000 cu ft)
- Surface area: 47 hectares (120 acres)

Senganishi Dam (Japanese: 千貫石ダム（再）) is an earthfill dam located in Iwate Prefecture in Japan. The dam is used for irrigation. The dam impounds about 47 ha of land when full and can store 5168 thousand cubic meters of water. The construction of the dam was completed in 1934.

== See also ==
- List of dams in Japan
