= Sorihikizawa Tameike Dam =

Dam in Iwate Prefecture, Japan

Sorihikizawa Tameike
- Location within Japan
- Official name: 橇引沢溜池
- Location: Iwate Prefecture, Japan
- Coordinates: 39°12′51″N 141°0′36″E
- Opening date: 1935

Dam and spillways
- Height: 23.5 m (77 ft)
- Length: 142 m (466 ft)

Reservoir
- Total capacity: 1,686,000 m^{3} (59,500,000 cu ft)
- Surface area: 29 hectares (72 acres)

Sorihikizawa Tameike (Japanese: 橇引沢溜池) is an earthfill dam located in Iwate Prefecture in Japan. The dam is used for irrigation. The dam impounds about 29 ha of land when full and can store 1686 thousand cubic meters of water. The construction of the dam was completed in 1935.

== See also ==
- List of dams in Japan
