= Hisanai Tameike Dam =

Dam in Iwate Prefecture, Japan

- Location within Japan
- Interactive map of Hisanai Tameike Dam
- Official name: 佐比内溜池
- Location: Iwate Prefecture, Japan
- Coordinates: 39°18′06″N 141°39′38″E
- Construction began: 1980
- Opening date: 1982

Dam and spillways
- Height: 27 m (89 ft)
- Length: 92 m (302 ft)

Reservoir
- Total capacity: 650 thousand cubic meters
- Catchment area: 7.6 sq. km

Hisanai Tameike Dam (Japanese: 佐比内溜池) is an earthfill dam located in Iwate Prefecture in Japan. The dam is used for irrigation. The catchment area of the dam is 7.6 km^{2}. The dam can store 650 thousand cubic meters of water. The construction of the dam was started on 1980 and completed in 1982.

== See also ==
- List of dams in Japan
