= Yuda Dam =

Dam in Iwate Prefecture, Japan

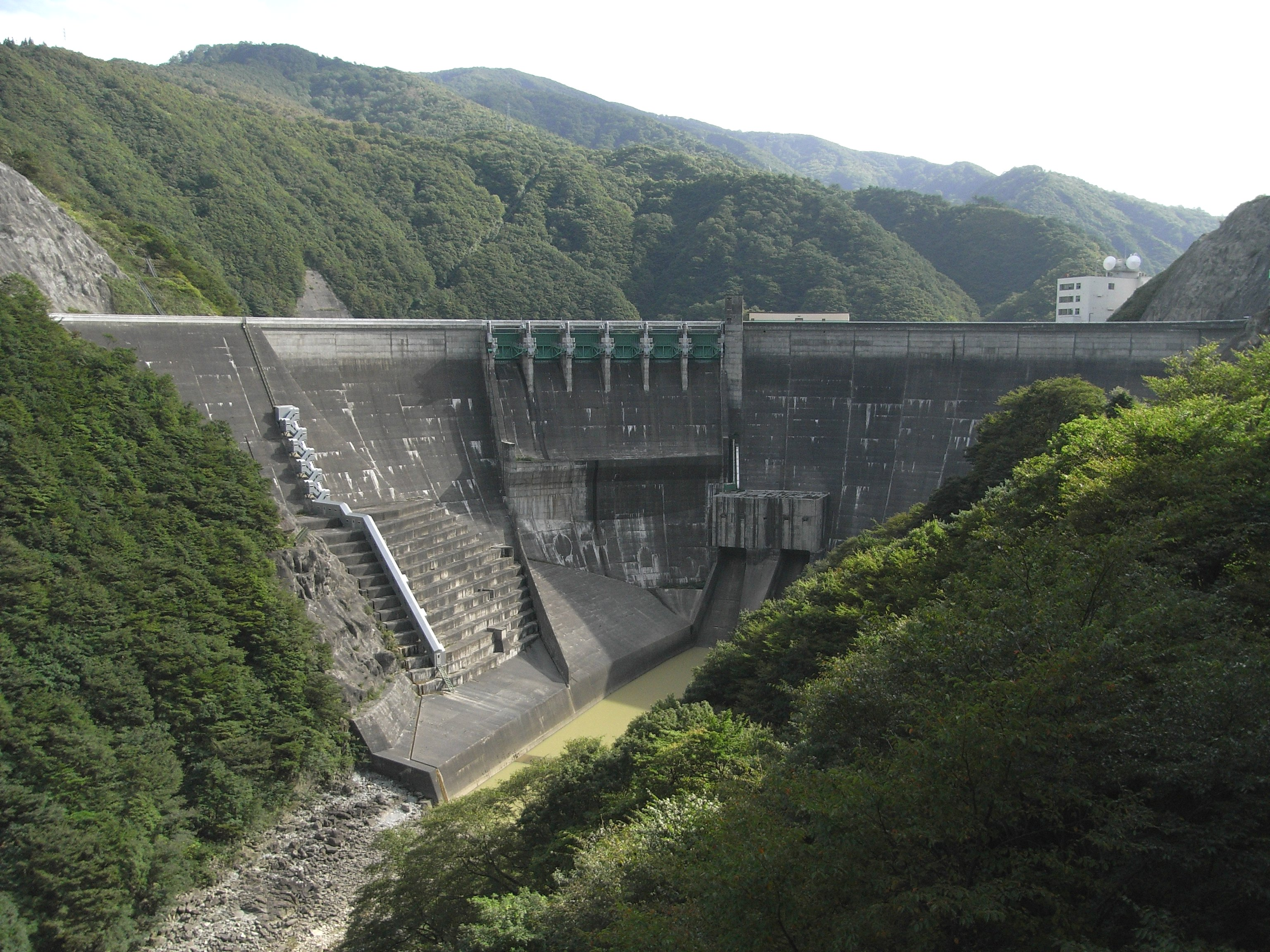
- Yuda Dam

- Location within Japan
- Official name: 湯田ダム
- Location: Nishiwaga, Iwate, Japan
- Coordinates: 39°18′06″N 140°53′06″E
- Construction began: 1953
- Opening date: 1964
- Owner: Ministry of Land, Infrastructure and Transport

Dam and spillways
- Type of dam: Arch-gravity dam
- Impounds: Waga River
- Height: 89.5 m (294 ft)
- Length: 265.0 m (869.4 ft)

Reservoir
- Creates: Lake Kinshu
- Total capacity: 114,160,000 m^{3}
- Catchment area: 583 km^{2}
- Surface area: 630 ha

Power Station
- Annual generation: 53,100 KW

Yuda Dam (湯田ダム) is a multipurpose dam located in the town of Nishiwaga, Iwate, in the Tohoku region of northern Japan. Completed in 1964, it is managed by the Tohoku Regional Development Bureau of the Ministry of Land, Infrastructure and Transport. Located on the Waga River, a branch of the Kitakami River, it is the third largest of the dams built as part of the Kitakami Area Comprehensive Development Plan (KVA). The dam creates Lake Kinshu, a popular sightseeing spot.

== History ==
The lower reaches of the Kitakami River are subject to flooding, especially near its dual mouths at the city of Ichinoseki, Iwate, and plans to increase the river width were impractical due to urbanisation of the area. The Home Ministry, together with Tokyo Imperial University drafted a flood control plan in 1926, which was upgraded in 1938 when implementation began. The plan called for the construction of five large dams on the main stream of the Kitakami River and its major branches. However, only Tase Dam was completed before work on the project ceased due to World War II. Work resumed immediately after the end of the war; however, typhoons in 1947 and 1948 created severe damage nationwide and led to a restructuring of Japan's flood control priorities and need for increased hydroelectric power generation. In 1949, the number of planned dams was increased to ten, and the location of Yuda Dam was changed from the initial plan to the local point about 13 kilometers downstream in the Waga River. Under the 1950 National Land Planning Act promulgated by the Yoshida administration, work on the Yuda Dam came under the aegis of the Kitakami Area Comprehensive Development Plan (KVA), which was modelled after the American Tennessee Valley Authority (TVA). Construction on the dam started in 1953.

Opposition to the dam was very strong by local residents, as the dam would submerge the center of the village of Yuda along with much of the villages Kawajiri, Oishi and Ararazawa. The number of people affected was 3200 residents in 622 households. In addition to the loss of homes and agricultural land, the dam also submerged a 13 kilometer section of Japan National Route 107, 15.3 kilometers of the Kitakami Line railway (along with three train stations), 13 mines, two power plants, and one pre-existing dam. For this reason, compensation negotiations were with villagers, Japan National Railway, mining rights owners, forest owners, water rights holders were complex, and drew nationwide attention as the negotiations continued. A settlement was reached in May 1957 and relocation was completed by 1963.

The dam was planned as a concrete gravity dam with a height of 89.5 meters. The bedrock was found to be granite and the design was changed to a concrete arch design to reduce the amount on concrete used (and thereby the construction costs); however, the bedrock was later found to have deposit zones and faults, and the design was changed again to a gravity arch design. Per the Japan Dam Association, there are only 12 examples of this design in Japan. Construction was extremely difficult, and in 1960, a new fault zone was discovered and in 1961 construction was further delayed by a collapse of the right bank rock. In 1965 the dam was completed.

== Lake Kinshu ==
The reservoir formed by the dam is Lake Kinshu, which forms the center of Yuda Onsenkyō Prefectural Natural Park. The area is noted for its birdlife and its autumn foliage.
