= Senmatsu Dam =

Dam in Iwate Prefecture, Japan

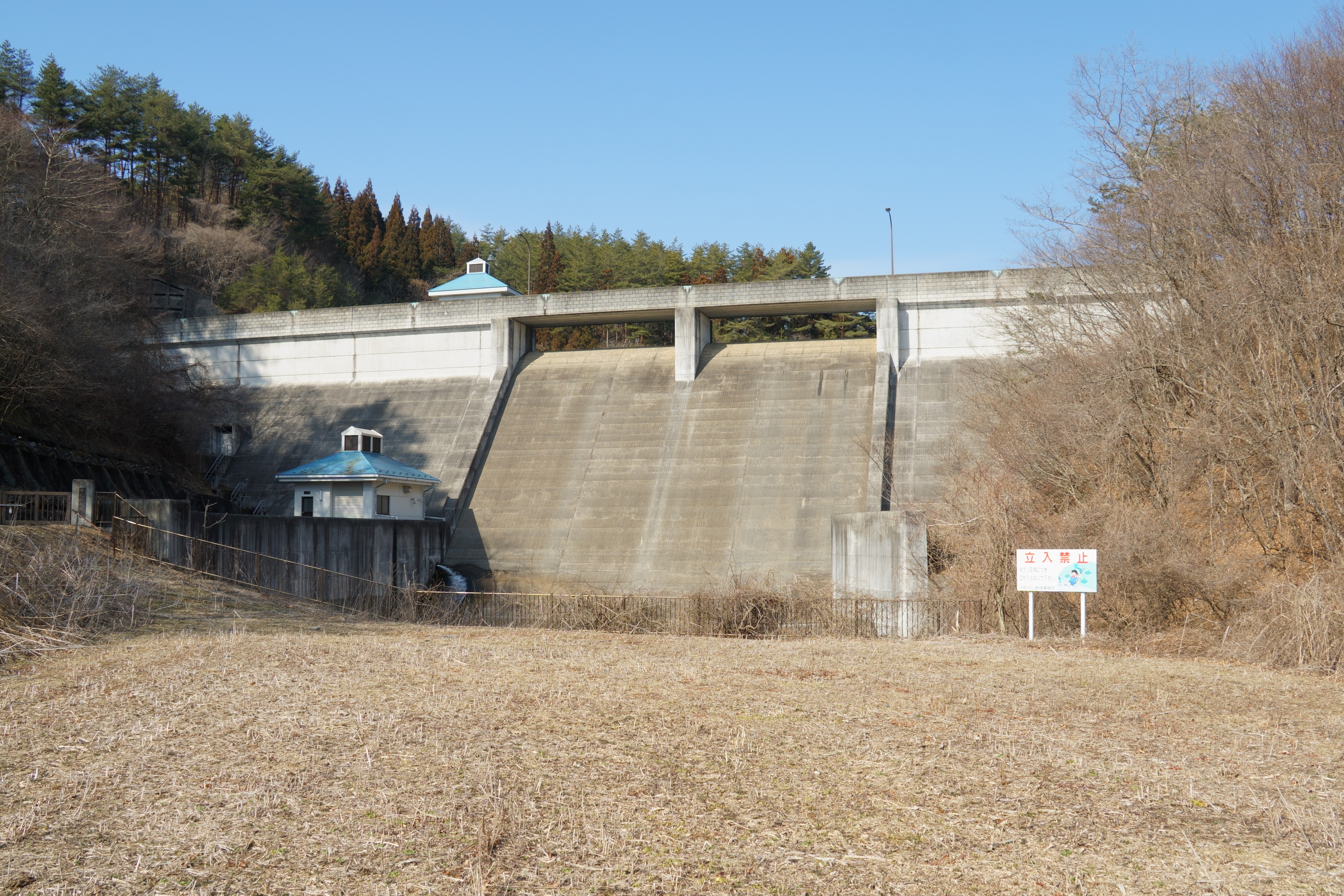

- Location within Japan
- Official name: 千松ダム
- Location: Iwate Prefecture, Japan
- Coordinates: 38°48′03″N 141°24′47″E
- Construction began: 1983
- Opening date: 1998

Dam and spillways
- Height: 26.8 m (88 ft)
- Length: 111 m (364 ft)

Reservoir
- Total capacity: 260,000 m^{3} (9,200,000 cu ft)
- Catchment area: 1.3 km^{2} (0.50 sq mi)
- Surface area: 4 hectares (9.9 acres)

Senmatsu Dam (Japanese: 千松ダム) is a gravity dam located in Iwate Prefecture in Japan. The dam is used for irrigation. The catchment area of the dam is 1.3 km^{2}. The dam impounds about 4 ha of land when full and can store 260 thousand cubic meters of water. The construction of the dam was started on 1983 and completed in 1998.

== See also ==
- List of dams in Japan
