= Koromogawa No.5 Dam =

Dam in Iwate Prefecture, Japan

- Location within Japan
- Official name: 衣川５号ダム
- Location: Iwate Prefecture, Japan
- Coordinates: 39°0′35″N 141°3′50″E
- Opening date: 1954

Dam and spillways
- Height: 20.5 m (67 ft)
- Length: 73.5 m (241 ft)

Reservoir
- Total capacity: 283 thousand cubic meters
- Catchment area: 2.6 sq. km
- Surface area: 4 hectares

Koromogawa No.5 Dam (Japanese: 衣川５号ダム) is an earthfill dam located in Iwate Prefecture in Japan. The dam is used for flood control and irrigation. The catchment area of the dam is 2.6 km^{2}. The dam impounds about 4 ha of land when full and can store 283 thousand cubic meters of water. The construction of the dam was completed in 1954.

== See also ==
- List of dams in Japan
