= Ikkatai Dam =

Dam in Iwate Prefecture, Japan

- Location within Japan
- Interactive map of Ikkatai Dam
- Official name: 一方井ダム
- Location: Iwate Prefecture, Japan
- Coordinates: 40°0′51″N 141°7′59″E
- Construction began: 1972
- Opening date: 1990

Dam and spillways
- Height: 40 m (130 ft)
- Length: 390 m (1,280 ft)

Reservoir
- Total capacity: 2240 thousand cubic meters
- Catchment area: 5.6 sq. km
- Surface area: 28 hectares

Ikkatai Dam (Japanese: 一方井ダム) is a rockfill dam located in Iwate Prefecture in Japan. The dam is used for irrigation. The catchment area of the dam is 5.6 km^{2}. The dam impounds about 28 ha of land when full and can store 2240 thousand cubic meters of water. The construction of the dam was started on 1972 and completed in 1990.

== See also ==
- List of dams in Japan
