= Arasawa No.2 Dam =

Dam in Iwate Prefecture, Japan

- Location within Japan
- Interactive map of Arasawa No.2 Dam
- Official name: 荒沢２号ダム
- Location: Iwate Prefecture, Japan
- Coordinates: 40°2′05″N 140°56′41″E
- Construction began: 1973
- Opening date: 1989

Dam and spillways
- Height: 45.5 m (149 ft)
- Length: 246.6 m (809 ft)

Reservoir
- Total capacity: 899 thousand cubic meters
- Catchment area: 12 sq. km
- Surface area: 12 hectares

Arasawa No.2 Dam (Japanese: 荒沢２号ダム) is a rockfill dam located in Iwate Prefecture in Japan. The dam is used for flood control. The catchment area of the dam is 12 km^{2}. The dam impounds about 12 ha of land when full and can store 899 thousand cubic meters of water. The construction of the dam was started on 1973 and completed in 1989.

== See also ==
- List of dams in Japan
