= Sotomasuzawa Dam =

Dam in Iwate Prefecture, Japan

- Location within Japan
- Official name: 外桝沢ダム
- Location: Iwate Prefecture, Japan
- Coordinates: 39°36′49″N 140°58′13″E
- Opening date: 1961

Dam and spillways
- Height: 22.5 m (74 ft)
- Length: 169 m (554 ft)

Reservoir
- Total capacity: 994,000 m^{3} (35,100,000 cu ft)
- Catchment area: 7.5 km^{2} (2.9 sq mi)
- Surface area: 13 hectares (32 acres)

Sotomasuzawa Dam (Japanese: 外桝沢ダム) is a gravity dam located in Iwate Prefecture in Japan. The dam is used for flood control. The catchment area of the dam is 7.5 km^{2}. The dam impounds about 13 ha of land when full and can store 994 thousand cubic meters of water. The construction of the dam was completed in 1961.

== See also ==
- List of dams in Japan
