= Koromogawa No.4 Dam =

Dam in Iwate Prefecture, Japan

- Location within Japan
- Official name: 衣川４号ダム
- Location: Iwate Prefecture, Japan
- Coordinates: 39°3′43″N 141°0′12″E
- Construction began: 1982
- Opening date: 1995

Dam and spillways
- Height: 33 m (108 ft)
- Length: 135 m (443 ft)

Reservoir
- Total capacity: 570 thousand cubic meters
- Catchment area: 3.9 sq. km
- Surface area: 7 hectares

Koromogawa No.4 Dam (Japanese: 衣川４号ダム) is a rockfill dam located in Iwate Prefecture in Japan. The dam is used for flood control. The catchment area of the dam is 3.9 km^{2}. The dam impounds about 7 ha of land when full and can store 570 thousand cubic meters of water. The construction of the dam was started on 1982 and completed in 1995.

== See also ==
- List of dams in Japan
