= Yabitsu Dam =

Dam in Iwate Prefecture, Japan

- Location within Japan
- Official name: 矢櫃ダム
- Location: Iwate Prefecture, Japan
- Coordinates: 39°36′54″N 141°0′37″E
- Construction began: 1970
- Opening date: 1981

Dam and spillways
- Height: 33.5 m (110 ft)
- Length: 140 m (460 ft)

Reservoir
- Total capacity: 927,000 m^{3} (32,700,000 cu ft)
- Catchment area: 15.1 km^{2} (5.8 sq mi)
- Surface area: 11 hectares (27 acres)

Yabitsu Dam (Japanese: 矢櫃ダム) is a rockfill dam located in Iwate Prefecture in Japan. The dam is used for flood control. The catchment area of the dam is 15.1 km^{2}. The dam impounds about 11 ha of land when full and can store 927 thousand cubic meters of water. The construction of the dam was started on 1970 and completed in 1981.

== See also ==
- List of dams in Japan
