= Arasawa No.3 Dam =

Dam in Iwate Prefecture, Japan

- Location within Japan
- Interactive map of Arasawa No.3 Dam
- Official name: 荒沢３号ダム
- Location: Iwate Prefecture, Japan
- Coordinates: 40°2′39″N 140°57′31″E
- Opening date: 1960

Dam and spillways
- Height: 22 m (72 ft)
- Length: 155 m (509 ft)

Reservoir
- Total capacity: 1194 thousand cubic meters
- Catchment area: 12 sq. km
- Surface area: 19 hectares

Arasawa No.3 Dam (Japanese: 荒沢３号ダム) is an earthfill dam located in Iwate Prefecture in Japan. The dam is used for flood control. The catchment area of the dam is 12 km^{2}. The dam impounds about 19 ha of land when full and can store 1194 thousand cubic meters of water. The construction of the dam was completed in 1960.

== See also ==
- List of dams in Japan
