= Hayachine Dam =

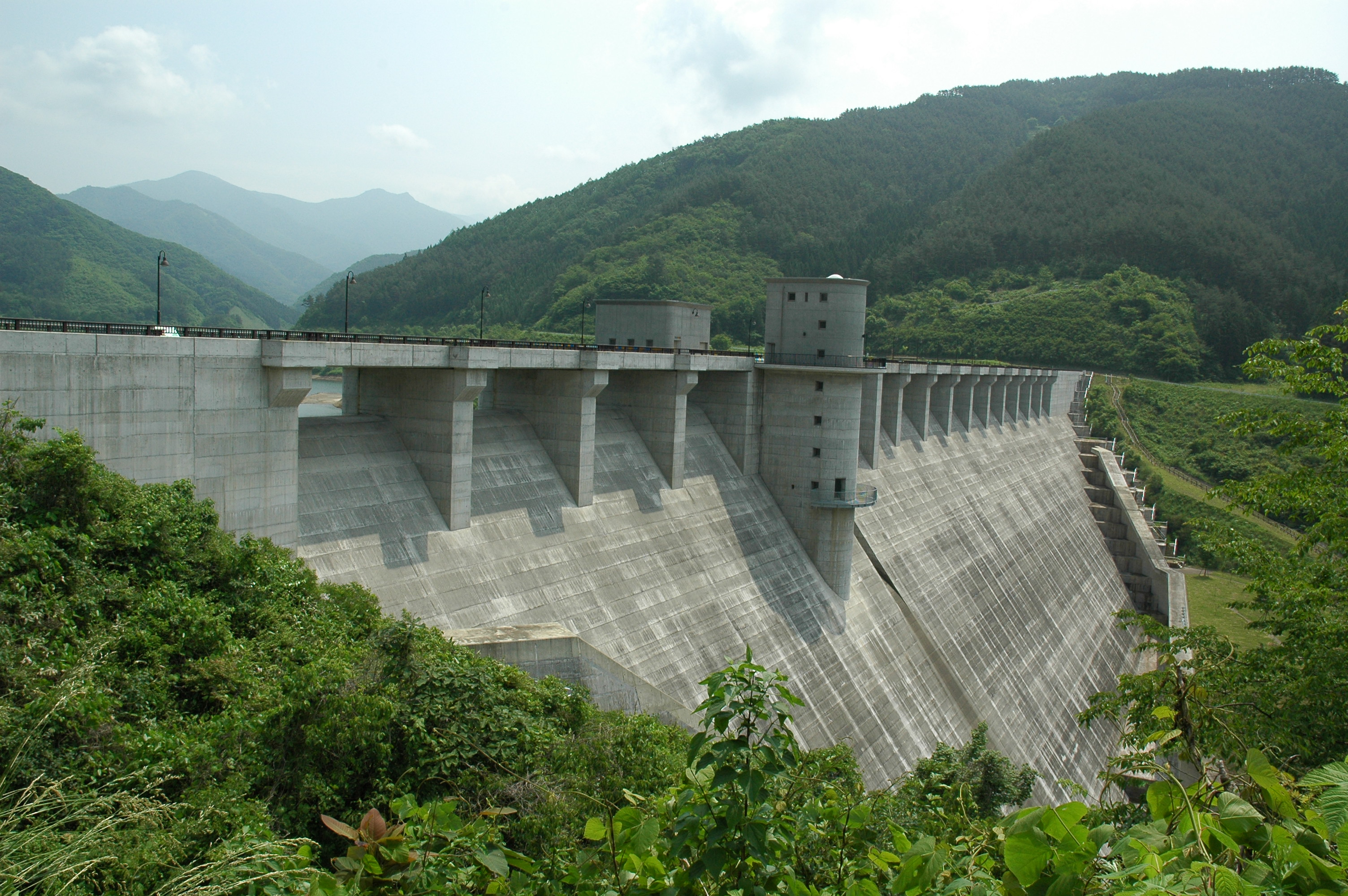

- Location within Japan
- Official name: 早池峰ダム
- Location: Hanamaki, Iwate, Japan
- Coordinates: 39°31′53″N 141°20′22″E
- Construction began: 1982
- Opening date: 2000
- Operator: Iwate Prefecture

Dam and spillways
- Type of dam: Concrete gravity dam
- Impounds: Hienuki River
- Height: 73.5 m (241 ft)
- Length: 390.0 m (1,279.5 ft)

Reservoir
- Creates: Hayachine Lake
- Total capacity: 15,750,000 m3
- Catchment area: 71.5 km2

Power Station
- Operator: Iwate Prefecture
- Annual generation: 3000 KW

The Hayachine Dam (早池峰ダム, Hayachine damu) is a multi-purpose dam on the Hienuki River, a branch of the Kitakami River, located in the city of Hanamaki, Iwate Prefecture in the Tōhoku region of northern Japan. It managed by Hanamaki Civil Engineering Center, Minami Kunisaki Promotion Department, and is a gravity-type concrete dam with a bank height of 73.5 meters.

== History ==
Hayachine Dam is one a series of five multipurpose dams built directly on the Kitakami River and its major tributaries, starting with the Tase Dam in 1941. The dam was intended to provide industrial and drinking water for the growing city of Hanamaki, as well as irrigation water, flood control and hydroelectric power. The dam was completed by the Kajima Corporation in 2000.

== Design ==
The Hayachine Dam is a concrete gravity arch dam. The associated hydroelectric power plant has an installed capacity of 3000 KW.
