= Ohsawa Dam (Hokkaido) =

Dam in Hokkaido Prefecture, Japan

- Location within Japan
- Location: Hokkaido Prefecture, Japan
- Coordinates: 43°48′14″N 142°38′27″E
- Construction began: 1974
- Opening date: 2002

Dam and spillways
- Height: 28.9 m (95 ft)
- Length: 318 m (1,043 ft)

Reservoir
- Total capacity: 900,000 m^{3} (32,000,000 cu ft)
- Catchment area: 14.8 km^{2} (5.7 sq mi)
- Surface area: 11 hectares (27 acres)

Ohsawa Dam (Japanese: 大沢ダム) is a rockfill dam located in Tōma, Hokkaido Prefecture in Japan. The dam is used for flood control. The catchment area of the dam is 14.8 km^{2}. The dam impounds about 11 ha of land when full and can store 900 thousand cubic meters of water. The construction of the dam was started on 1974 and completed in 2002.
