= Mount Neishi =

Mountain in the country of Japan

- 根石岳
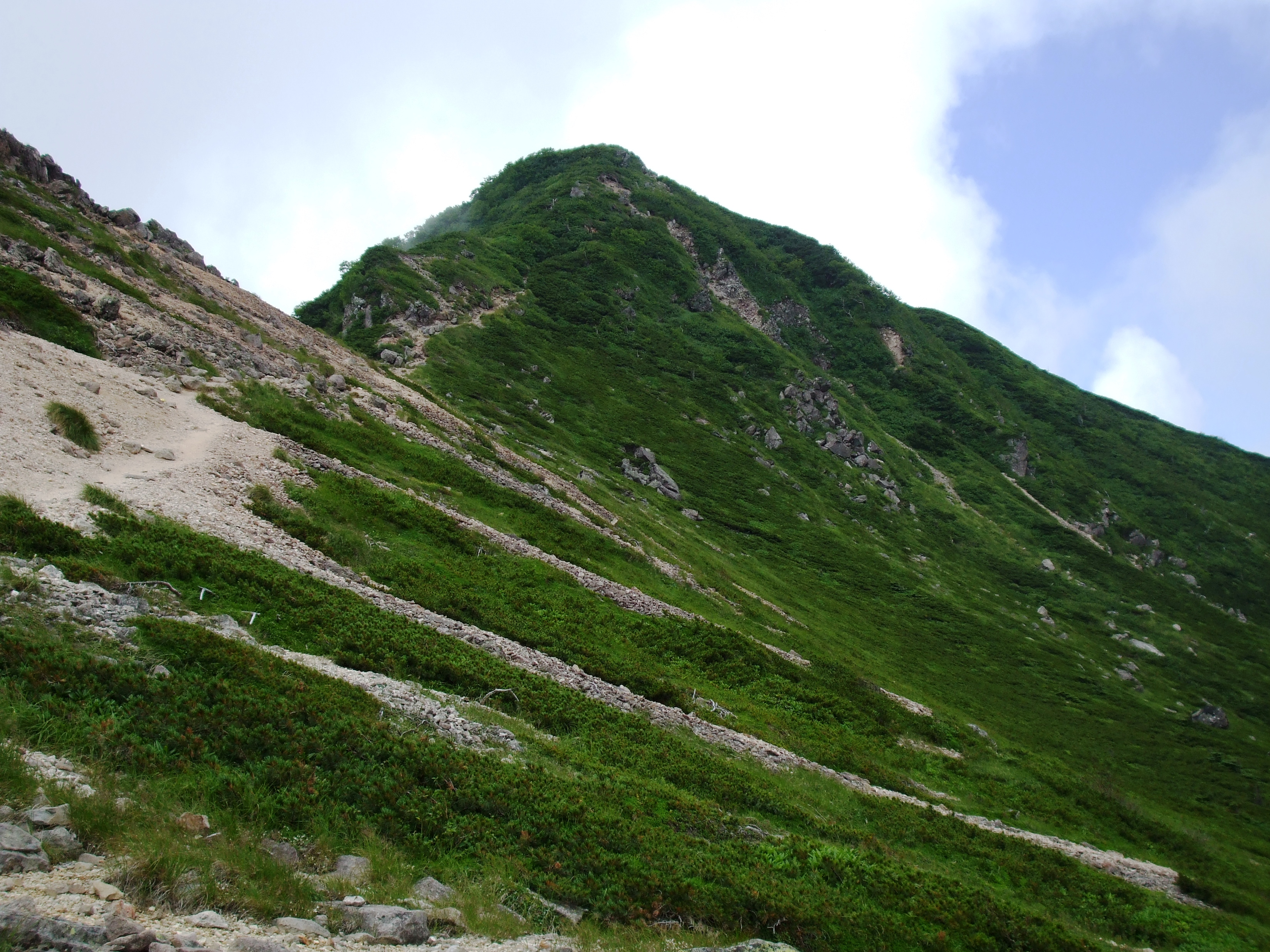
- Mount Neishi from Mount Higashi-Tengu

Highest point
- Elevation: 2,603 m (8,540 ft)
- Listing: List of mountains and hills of Japan by height
- Coordinates: 36°00′56″N 138°21′37″E

Naming
- Language of name: Japanese
- Pronunciation: [neiɕidake]

Geography
- Location: On the border of Chino and Koumi of Nagano in Japan
- Parent range: Northern Yatsugatake Volcanic Group

Geology
- Mountain type: Stratovolcano

Mount Neishi (根石岳, Neishi-dake) is a 2,603m mountain on the border of Chino and Koumi of Nagano in Japan. This mountain belongs to Northern Yatsugatake Volcanic Group.

== Description ==
Mount Neishi is a stratovolcano. This mountain is a part of the Yatsugatake-Chūshin Kōgen Quasi-National Park. Mount Higashi Tengu (東天狗岳), 2,603 m (8,540 ft), lies to the north, along the main traverse route of the Yatsugatake Mountain Range, and Mount Nishi Tengu, 2,646 m (8,681 ft), is to the northwest. There is trail from Shibunoyu (渋の湯) to Nakayama Pass (中山峠, Nakayama tōge), through Mount Higashi Tengu, to Mount Neishi. Additionally, there is a trail heading east to Honzawa Onsen (本沢温泉), on the pass between Mount Higashi Tengu and Mount Neishi.

Mount Mikaburi (箕冠山), 2,590 m (8,497 ft), Natsusawa Pass (夏沢峠, Natsu sawa tōge), 2,423 m (7,949 ft), and Mount Iō, 27,603 m (90,561 ft) are located to the south. A lodge, Neishi Sanso (根石山荘, Neishi Sansō), is located on the south side, 15 minutes from the peak.. The lodge is open April to November. The main traverse route of the Yatsugatake Mountain Range passes through the summit of Mount Neishi.

== Access ==
- * Shibunoyu Bus Stop (渋の湯バス亭, Shibunoyu basu tei) or Tatsunokanmae Bus Stop (辰野館前バス亭, Tatsunokanmae basu tei) of Alpico Kōtsū from Chino Station

== Gallery ==
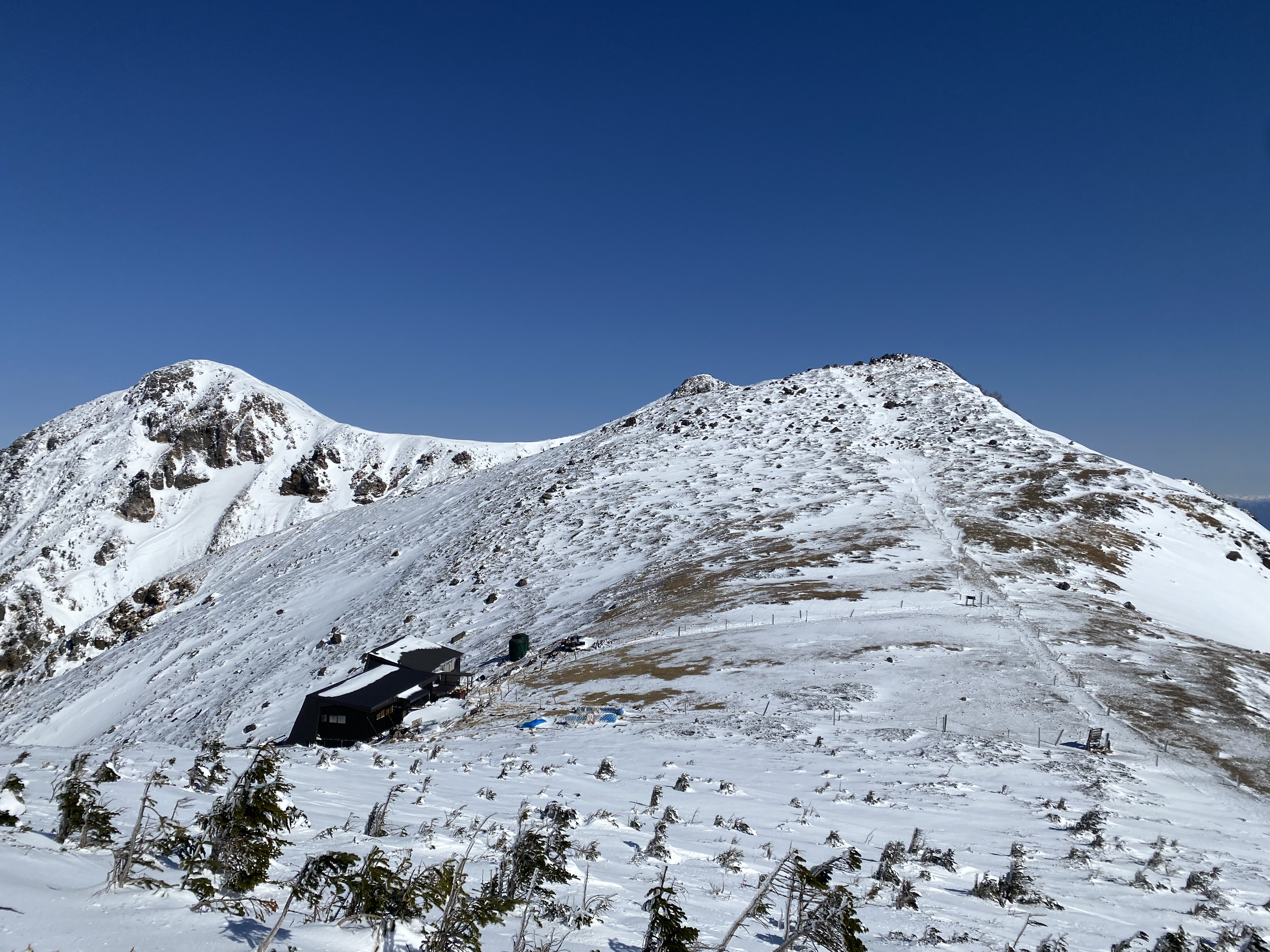
Mt Neishi (with Mt. Tengu behind) from Mt Mikaburi, March 2024

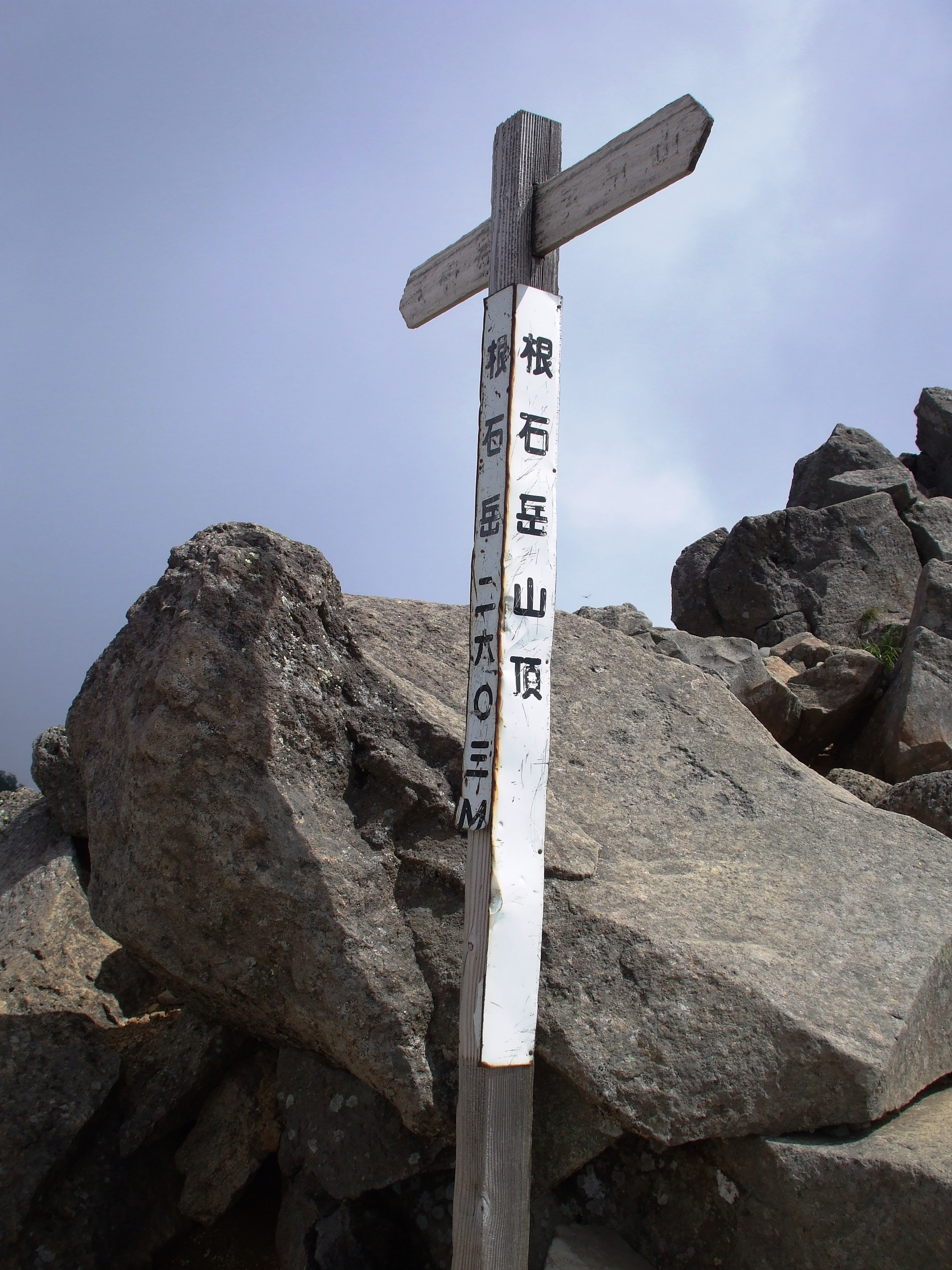
The top of Mount Neishi

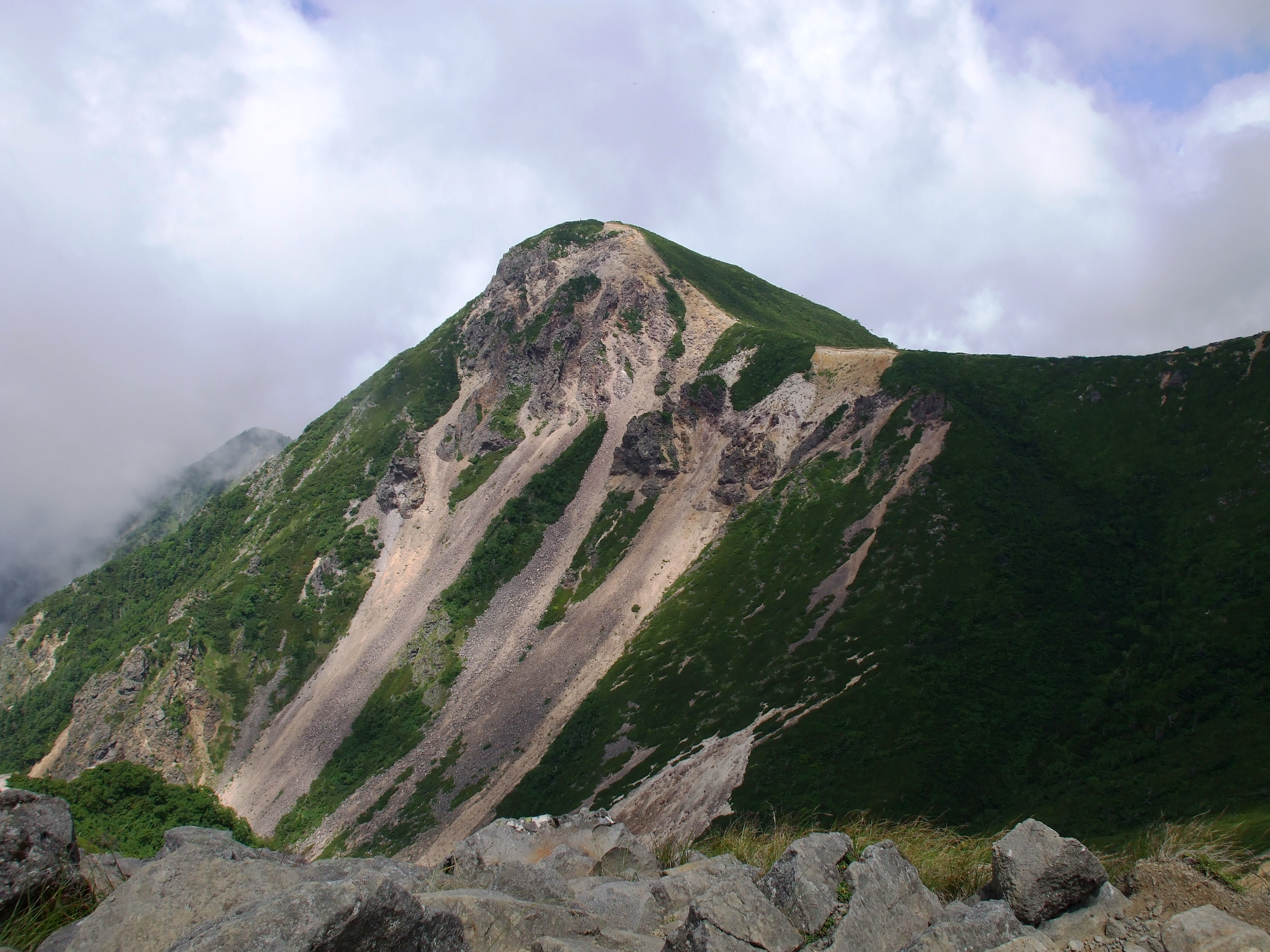
Mount Nishi-Tengu from Mount Neishi

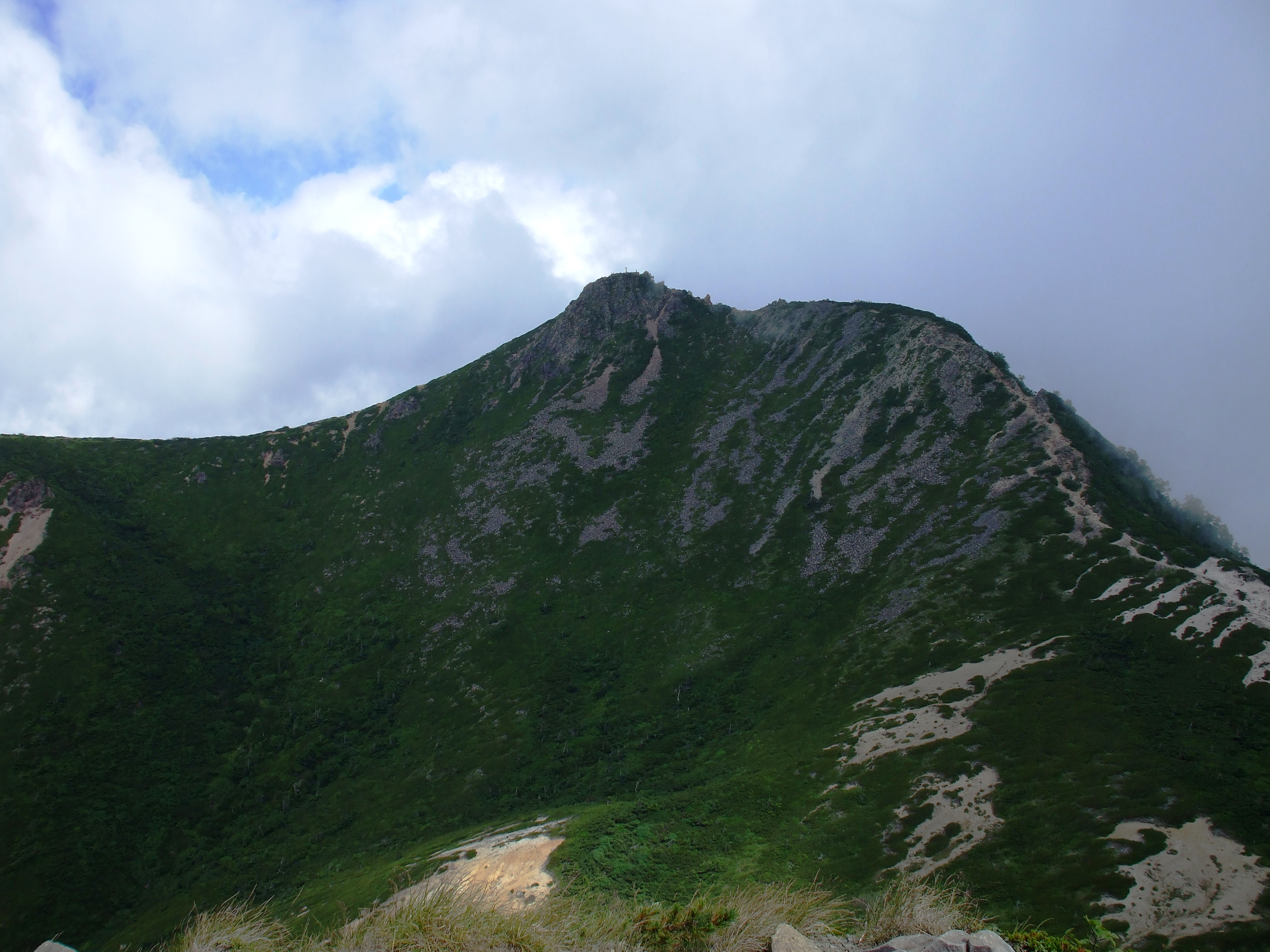
Mount Higashi-Tengu from Mount Neishi

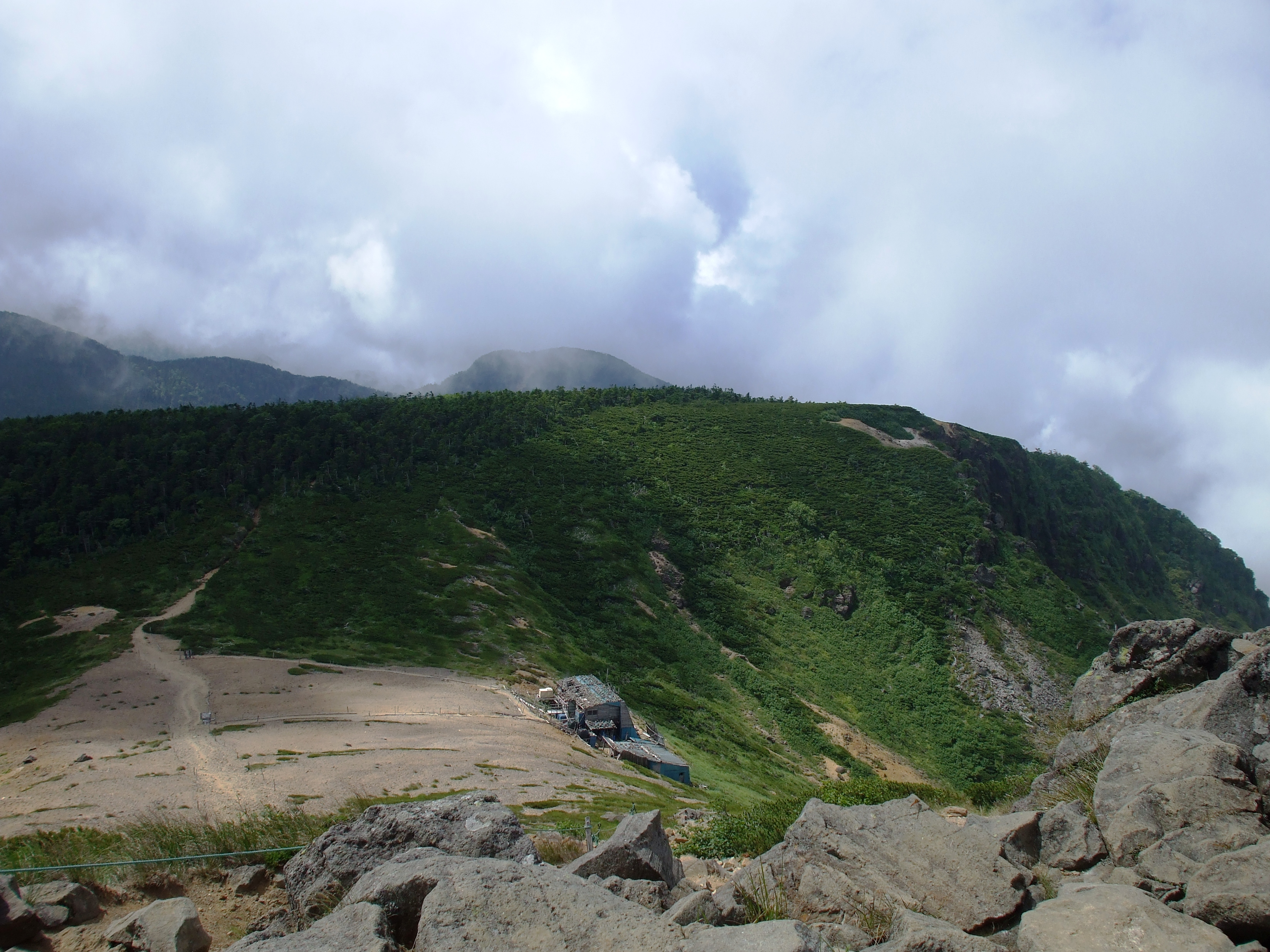
Neishi Hut from Mount Neishi
