= Kemuyama Dam =

Dam in Iwate Prefecture, Japan

- Location within Japan
- Official name: 煙山ダム
- Location: Iwate Prefecture, Japan
- Coordinates: 39°37′00″N 141°5′53″E
- Opening date: 1967

Dam and spillways
- Height: 21.8 m (72 ft)
- Length: 528.5 m (1,734 ft)

Reservoir
- Total capacity: 1410 thousand cubic meters
- Catchment area: 10.8 sq. km
- Surface area: 28 hectares

Kemuyama Dam (Japanese: 煙山ダム) is an earthfill dam located in Iwate Prefecture in Japan. The dam is used for flood control and irrigation. The catchment area of the dam is 10.8 km^{2}. The dam impounds about 28 ha of land when full and can store 1410 thousand cubic meters of water. The construction of the dam was completed in 1967.

== See also ==
- List of dams in Japan
