= Koromogawa No. 3 Dam =

Dam in Iwate Prefecture, Japan

- Location within Japan
- Official name: 衣川３号ダム
- Location: Iwate Prefecture, Japan, Pacific Ocean.
- Coordinates: 39°1′24″N 141°1′59″E
- Construction began: 1972
- Opening date: 1987

Dam and spillways
- Height: 41 m (135 ft)
- Length: 180 m (590 ft)

Reservoir
- Total capacity: 1790 thousand cubic meters
- Catchment area: 15.4 sq. km
- Surface area: 17 hectares

Koromogawa No. 3 Dam (Japanese: 衣川３号ダム) is a rockfill dam located in Iwate Prefecture in Japan. The dam is used for flood control. The catchment area of the dam is 15.4 km^{2}. The dam impounds about 17 ha of land when full and can store 1790 thousand cubic meters of water. The construction of the dam was started on 1972 and completed in 1987.

== See also ==
- List of dams in Japan
