= Arasawa No. 1 Dam =

Dam in Iwate Prefecture, Japan

- Location within Japan
- Interactive map of Arasawa No. 1 Dam
- Official name: 荒沢１号ダム
- Location: Iwate Prefecture, Japan
- Coordinates: 40°0′53″N 140°56′03″E
- Opening date: 1972

Dam and spillways
- Height: 38 m (125 ft)
- Length: 157.7 m (517 ft)

Reservoir
- Total capacity: 2139 thousand cubic meters
- Catchment area: 19 sq. km
- Surface area: 16 hectares

Arasawa No. 1 Dam (Japanese: 荒沢１号ダム) is a rockfill dam located in Iwate Prefecture in Japan. The dam is used for flood control. The catchment area of the dam is 19 km^{2}. The dam impounds about 16 ha of land when full and can store 2139 thousand cubic meters of water. The construction of the dam was completed in 1972.

== See also ==
- List of dams in Japan
