= Ohno Dam (Iwate) =

Dam in Iwate Prefecture, Japan

- Location within Japan
- Official name: 大野ダム
- Location: Iwate Prefecture, Japan
- Coordinates: 40°14′53″N 141°38′56″E
- Construction began: 1982
- Opening date: 2004

Dam and spillways
- Height: 26 m (85 ft)
- Length: 108.3 m (355 ft)

Reservoir
- Total capacity: 700,000 m^{3} (25,000,000 cu ft)
- Catchment area: 3.3 km^{2} (1.3 sq mi)
- Surface area: 17 hectares (42 acres)

Ohno Dam (Japanese: 大野ダム) is a gravity dam located in Iwate Prefecture in Japan. The dam is used for irrigation. The catchment area of the dam is 3.3 km^{2}. The dam impounds about 17 ha of land when full and can store 700 thousand cubic meters of water. The construction of the dam was started on 1982 and completed in 2004.

== See also ==
- List of dams in Japan
