= Ryorigawa Dam =

Dam in Iwate Prefecture, Japan

- Location within Japan
- Official name: 綾里川ダム
- Location: Iwate Prefecture, Japan
- Coordinates: 39°3′44″N 141°46′42″E
- Construction began: 1986
- Opening date: 2000

Dam and spillways
- Height: 43 m (141 ft)
- Length: 154 m (505 ft)

Reservoir
- Total capacity: 486,000 m^{3} (17,200,000 cu ft)
- Catchment area: 1.6 km^{2} (0.62 sq mi)
- Surface area: 3 hectares (7.4 acres)

Ryorigawa Dam (Japanese: 綾里川ダム) is a gravity dam located in Iwate Prefecture in Japan. The dam is used for flood control and water supply. The catchment area of the dam is 1.6 km^{2}. The dam impounds about 3 ha of land when full and can store 486 thousand cubic meters of water. The construction of the dam was started on 1986 and completed in 2000.

== See also ==
- List of dams in Japan
