= Ishibane Dam =

Coordinates: 39°18′18″N 140°57′15″E

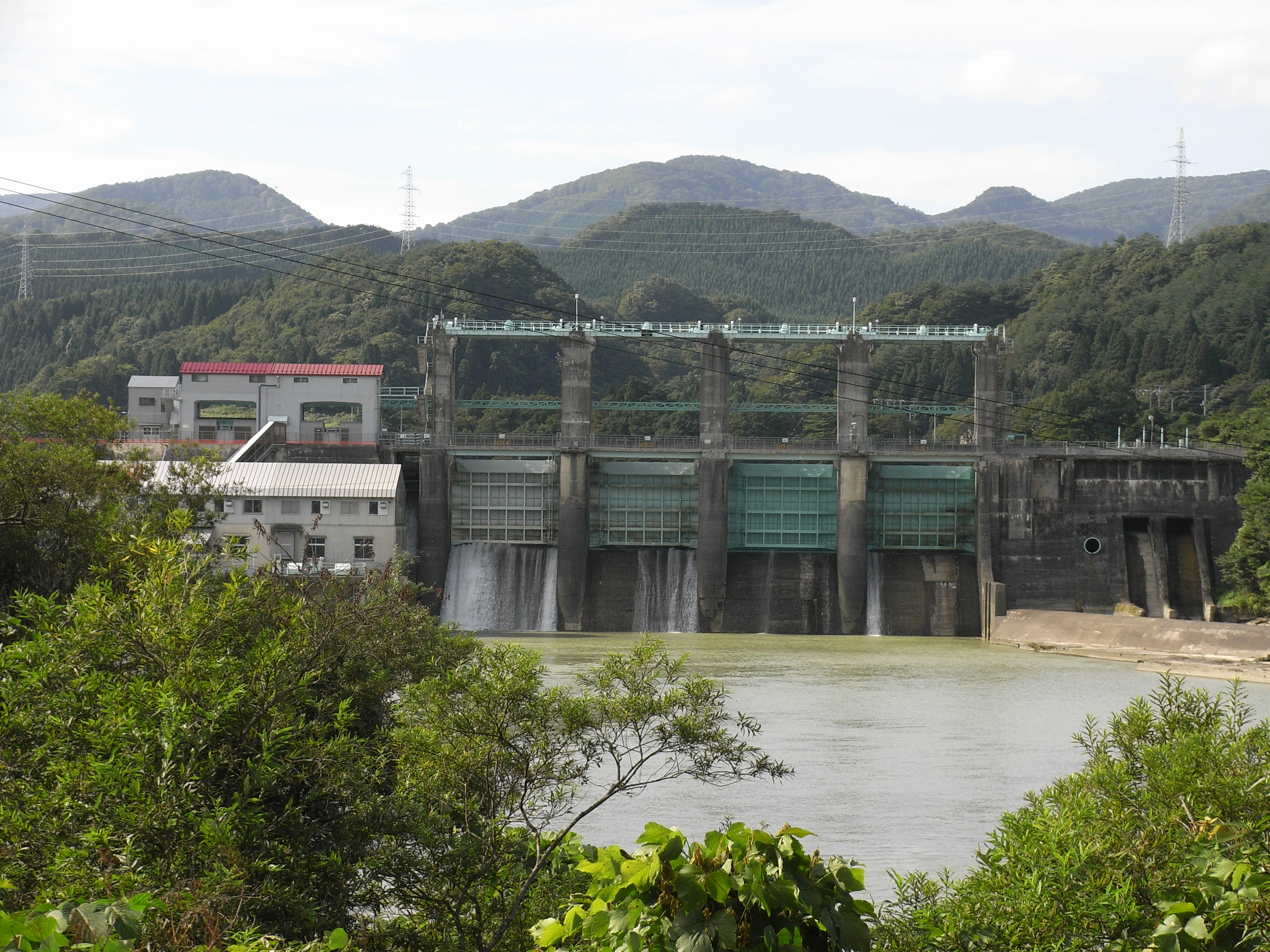
- Interactive map of Ishibane Dam
- Location: Kitakami, Iwate, Japan
- Construction began: 1952
- Opening date: 1953

Dam and spillways
- Height: 20.5 m (67 ft)
- Length: 283 m (928 ft)
- Dam volume: 38,000 m^{3}

Reservoir
- Total capacity: 4,050,000 m^{3}
- Catchment area: 725 km^{2}
- Surface area: 51 ha

Ishibane Dam (石羽根ダム, Ishibane damu) is a dam in Kitakami, Iwate Prefecture, Japan, completed in 1953.
