= Neishi Dam =

Dam in Iwate Prefecture, Japan

- Location within Japan
- Official name: 根石ダム
- Location: Iwate Prefecture, Japan
- Coordinates: 40°11′05″N 140°57′55″E
- Construction began: 1985
- Opening date: 2000

Dam and spillways
- Height: 41 m (135 ft)
- Length: 187.6 m (615 ft)

Reservoir
- Total capacity: 1425 thousand cubic meters
- Catchment area: 15.7 sq. km
- Surface area: 15 hectares

Neishi Dam (Japanese: 根石ダム) is a rockfill dam located in Iwate Prefecture in Japan. The dam is used for flood control. The catchment area of the dam is 15.7 km^{2}. The dam impounds about 15 ha of land when full and can store 1425 thousand cubic meters of water. The construction of the dam was started on 1985 and completed in 2000.

== See also ==
- List of dams in Japan
