= Irihata Dam =

Coordinates: 39°14′21″N 140°56′58″E

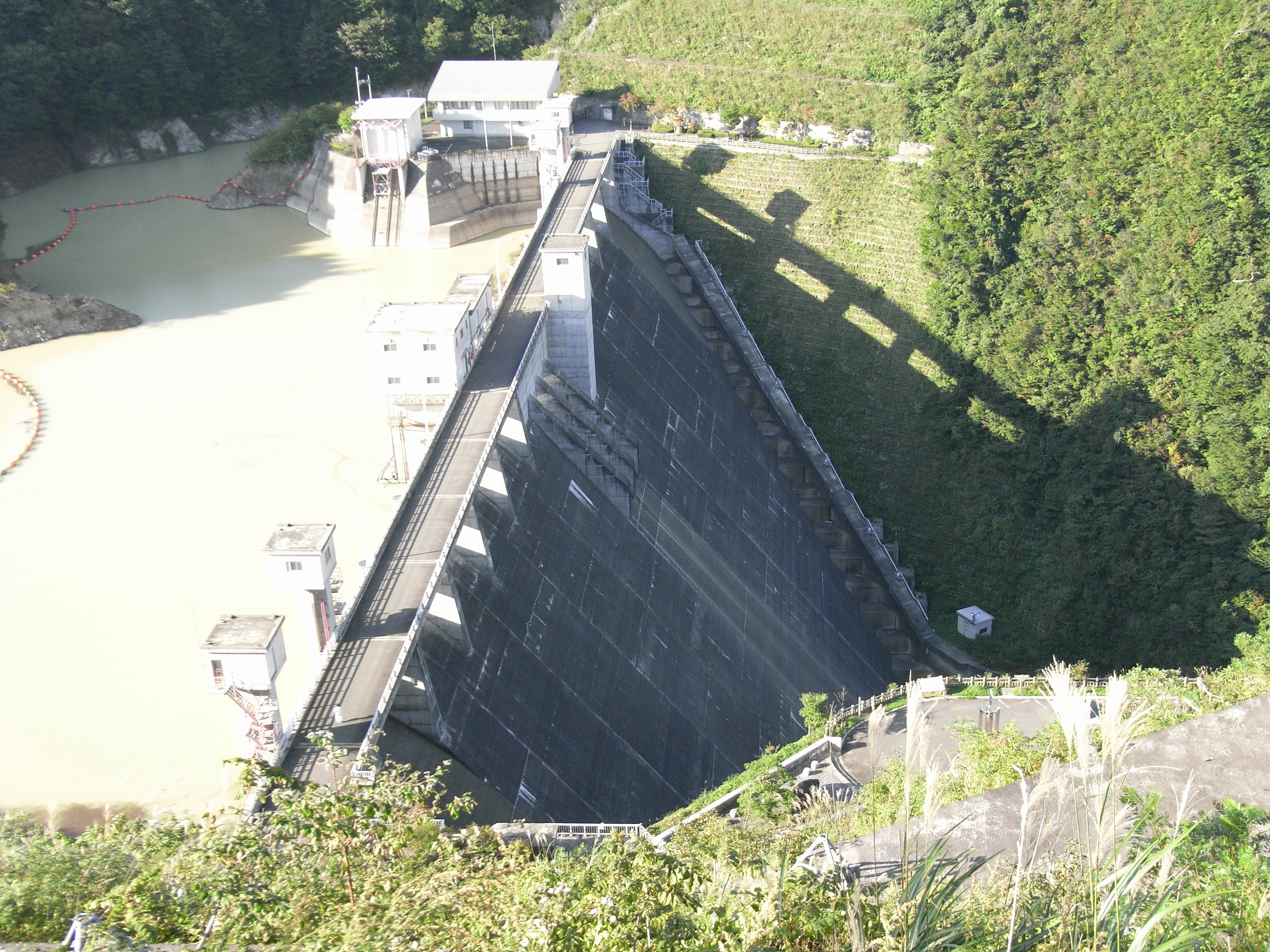
- Interactive map of Irihata Dam
- Location: Kitakami, Iwate, Japan
- Construction began: 1974
- Opening date: 1990

Dam and spillways
- Height: 80 m (260 ft)
- Length: 233 m (764 ft)
- Dam volume: 293,000 m^{3}

Reservoir
- Total capacity: 15,400,000 m^{3}
- Catchment area: 38 km^{2}
- Surface area: 63 ha

Irihata Dam (入畑ダム, Irihata damu) is a dam in Kitakami, Iwate Prefecture, Japan, completed in 1990.
