= Ohsawa Dam (Iwate) =

Dam in Iwate Prefecture, Japan

- Location within Japan
- Official name: 大沢ダム
- Location: Iwate Prefecture, Japan
- Coordinates: 39°35′13″N 141°44′38″E
- Construction began: 1939
- Opening date: 1943

Dam and spillways
- Height: 30.8 m (101 ft)
- Length: 67 m (220 ft)

Reservoir
- Total capacity: 170,000 m^{3} (6,000,000 cu ft)
- Catchment area: 17.3 km^{2} (6.7 sq mi)
- Surface area: 2 hectares (4.9 acres)

Ohsawa Dam (Japanese: 大沢ダム) is a gravity dam located in Iwate Prefecture in Japan. The dam is used for power production. The catchment area of the dam is 17.3 km^{2}. The dam impounds about 2 ha of land when full and can store 170 thousand cubic meters of water. The construction of the dam was started on 1939 and completed in 1943.

== See also ==
- List of dams in Japan
