= Tono Dam (Iwate) =

Dam in Iwate Prefecture, Japan

- Location within Japan
- Official name: 遠野ダム
- Location: Iwate Prefecture, Japan
- Coordinates: 39°18′22″N 141°32′08″E
- Opening date: 1957

Dam and spillways
- Height: 26.5 m (87 ft)
- Length: 181.5 m (595 ft)

Reservoir
- Total capacity: 1,030,000 m^{3} (36,000,000 cu ft)
- Catchment area: 29.6 km^{2} (11.4 sq mi)
- Surface area: 12 hectares (30 acres)

Tono Dam (Japanese: 遠野ダム) is a gravity dam located in Iwate Prefecture in Japan. The dam is used for flood control. The catchment area of the dam is 29.6 km^{2}. The dam impounds about 12 ha of land when full and can store 1030 thousand cubic meters of water. The construction of the dam was completed in 1957.

== See also ==
- List of dams in Japan
