= Sannōkai Dam =

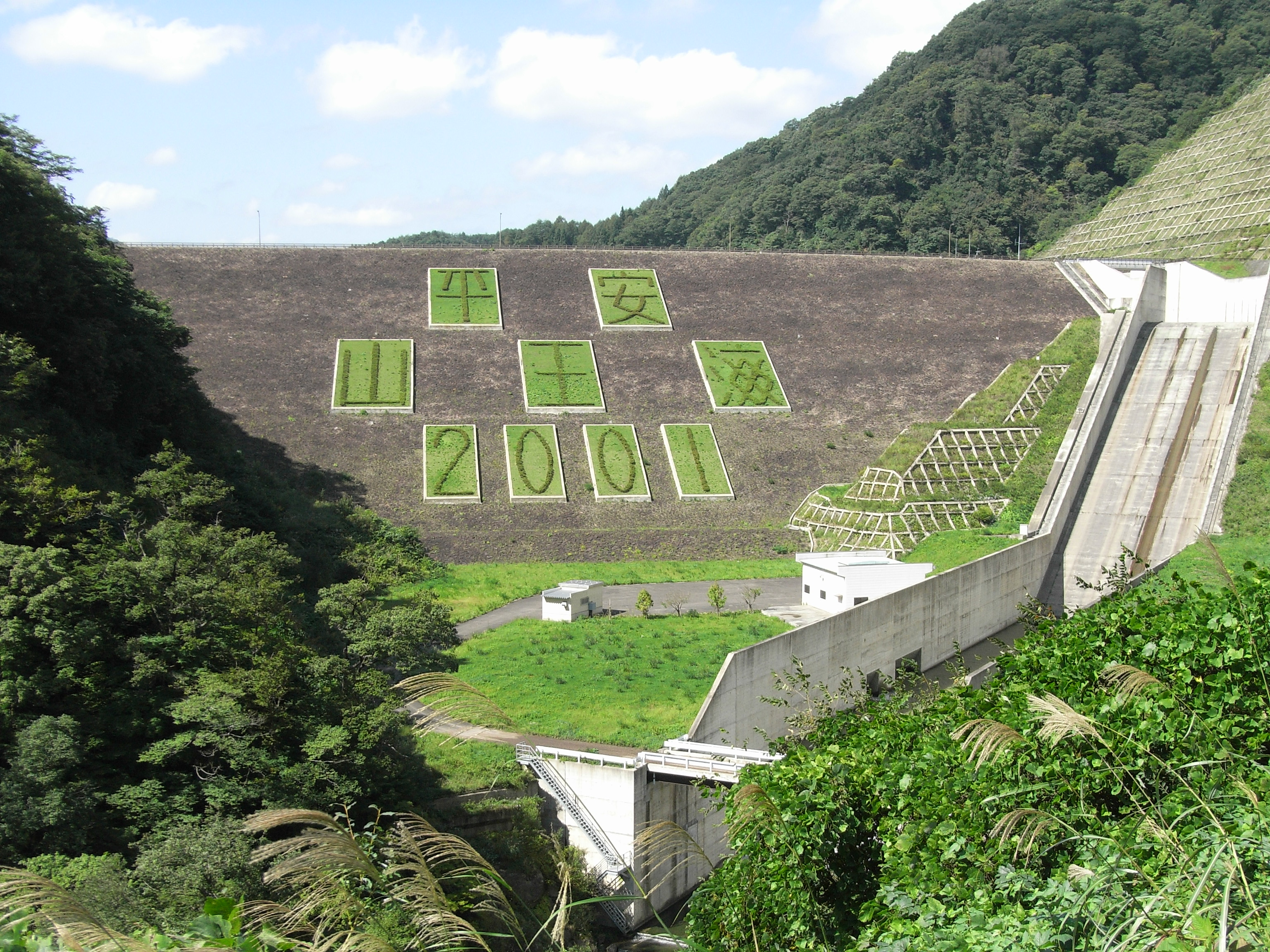

- Location within Japan
- Official name: 山王海ダム
- Location: Shiwa, Iwate, Japan
- Coordinates: 39°32′51″N 141°03′53″E
- Construction began: 1973
- Opening date: 2001
- Operator: Iwate Prefecture

Dam and spillways
- Impounds: Takina River
- Height: 61.5 m (202 ft)
- Length: 235.0 m (771.0 ft)

Reservoir
- Creates: Heian Lake
- Total capacity: 37,600,000 m3
- Catchment area: 37.7 km2
- Surface area: 250.0 hectares (618 acres)

The Sannōkai Dam (山王海ダム, Sannōkai damu) is a dam on the Toyosawa River, a tributary of the Kitakami River system, located in the town of Shiwa, Iwate Prefecture in the Tōhoku region of the island of Honshū, Japan. It completed in 1952.

== History ==
The need for storage reservoirs in the Kitakami River valley for irrigation purposes was recognized by the Meiji government at the start of the 20th century, due to repeated crop failures and conflicts between various communities over water rights, dating even from the early Edo period. The river also suffered from severe environmental problems with acidic runoff from upstream mining operations. Plans for a series of dams was initiated in 1941 by the Ministry of Agriculture and Forestry, but all work was halted during World War II. The plan was revived after the war, and the Sannōkai Dam was the first to be constructed.

== Design ==
The Sannōkai Dam was started in 1947 and was completed in 1952 as a 37.4-foot high earthen embankment dam. However, due to aging and concerns over safety, it was completely rebuilt starting in 1977 as a rock-fill dam, with its height raised to 61.5 meters. The new dam was completed in 2001.
