= Gando =

Gando may refer to:

== Places ==
- Gando, Benin, a village in Donga Department
- Gando, Burkina Faso, Boulgou Province
- Gando I, Boulgou Province, Burkina Faso
- Gando II, Boulgou Province, Burkina Faso
- Gando Constituency, a parliamentary constituency on the island of Pemba, Tanzania
- Gando, Zanzibar, a village in Tanzania
- Gandō Dam, Iwate Prefecture, Japan
- Gran Canaria Airport, Gran Canaria, Spain, formerly known as Gando Airport
- Gando Air Base, a base of the Spanish Air and Space Force located in the Gran Canaria island, Spain, and next to the Gran Canaria Airport
- Gwandu or Gando, Nigeria
- Gando (TV series) an Iranian television series
- Jiandao, or Gando (간도, in Korean)

== Other uses ==
- Gandō, a traditional Japanese gyroscopic lantern
- Gandō Dam, a dam on the Tandogawa River in Iwate Prefecture, Japan
- Mugger crocodile, a short-muzzled crocodile of southern Asia, known locally by the name gando
- Orlando Gando (born 1992), São Toméan footballer

== See also ==
- Kando (disambiguation)
