= Traditional lighting equipment of Japan =

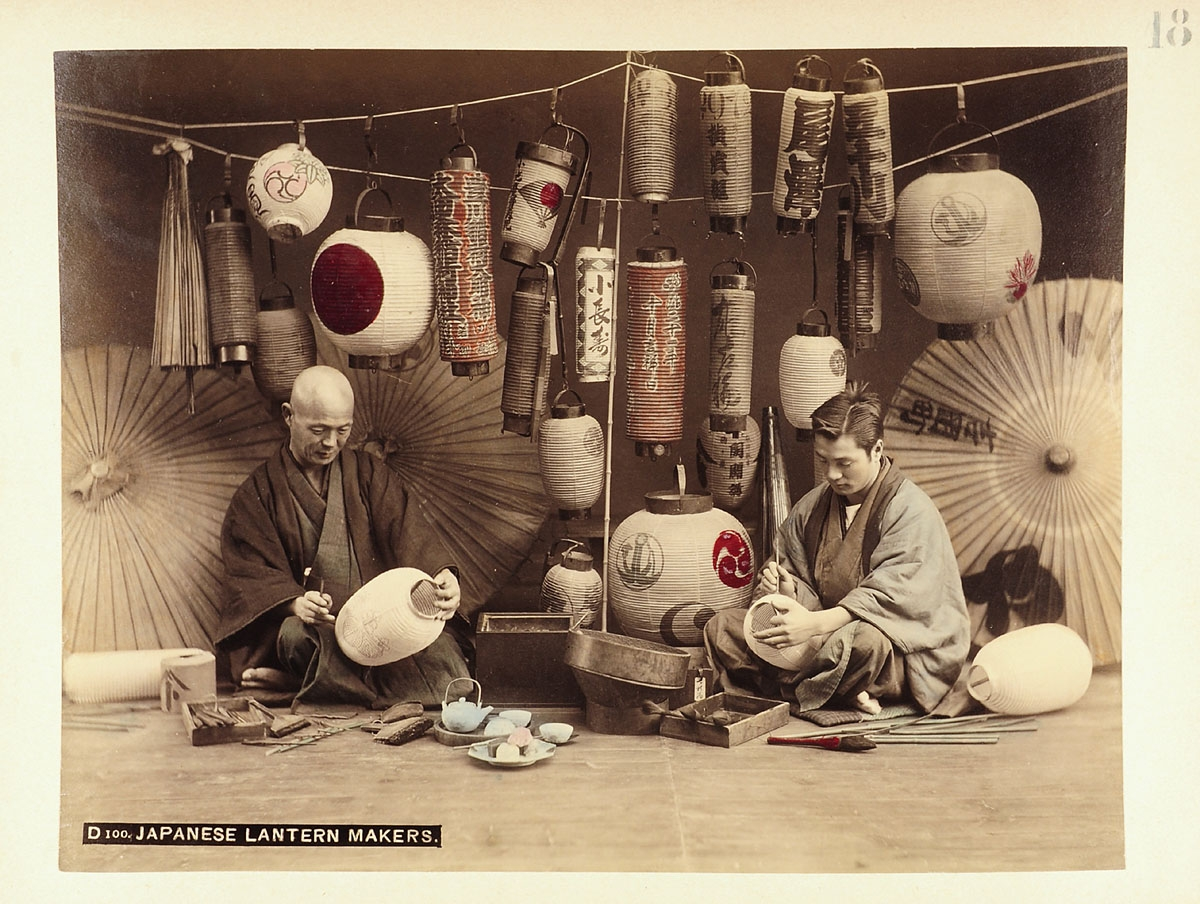
Japanese Lantern Makers, photo by T. Enami

The traditional lighting equipment of Japan includes the andon (行灯), the bonbori (雪洞), the chōchin (提灯), and the tōrō (灯篭).

== Andon ==
The andon is a lamp consisting of paper stretched over a frame of bamboo, wood or metal. The paper protected the flame from the wind. Burning oil in a stone, metal, or ceramic holder, with a wick of cotton or pith, provided the light. They were usually open on the top and bottom, with one side that could be lifted to provide access. Rapeseed oil was popular. Candles were also used, but their higher price made them less popular. A lower-priced alternative was sardine oil.

The andon became popular in the Edo period (1603–1867). Early on, the andon was handheld; it could also be placed on a stand or hung on a wall. The okiandon was most common indoors. Many had a vertical box shape with an inner stand for the light. Some had a drawer on the bottom to facilitate refilling and lighting. A handle on top made it portable. A variety was the Enshū andon. One explanation attributes it to Kobori Enshu, who lived in the late Azuchi-Momoyama period and early Edo period. Tubular in shape, it had an opening instead of a drawer. Another variety was the Ariake andon, a bedside lamp. The kakeandon under the eaves of a shop, often bearing the name of the merchant, was a common sight in the towns.

The expression hiru andon, or "daytime lamp," meant someone or something that seemed to serve no purpose. In dramatizations of the story of the forty-seven ronin, Oishi Yoshio is often given this description.

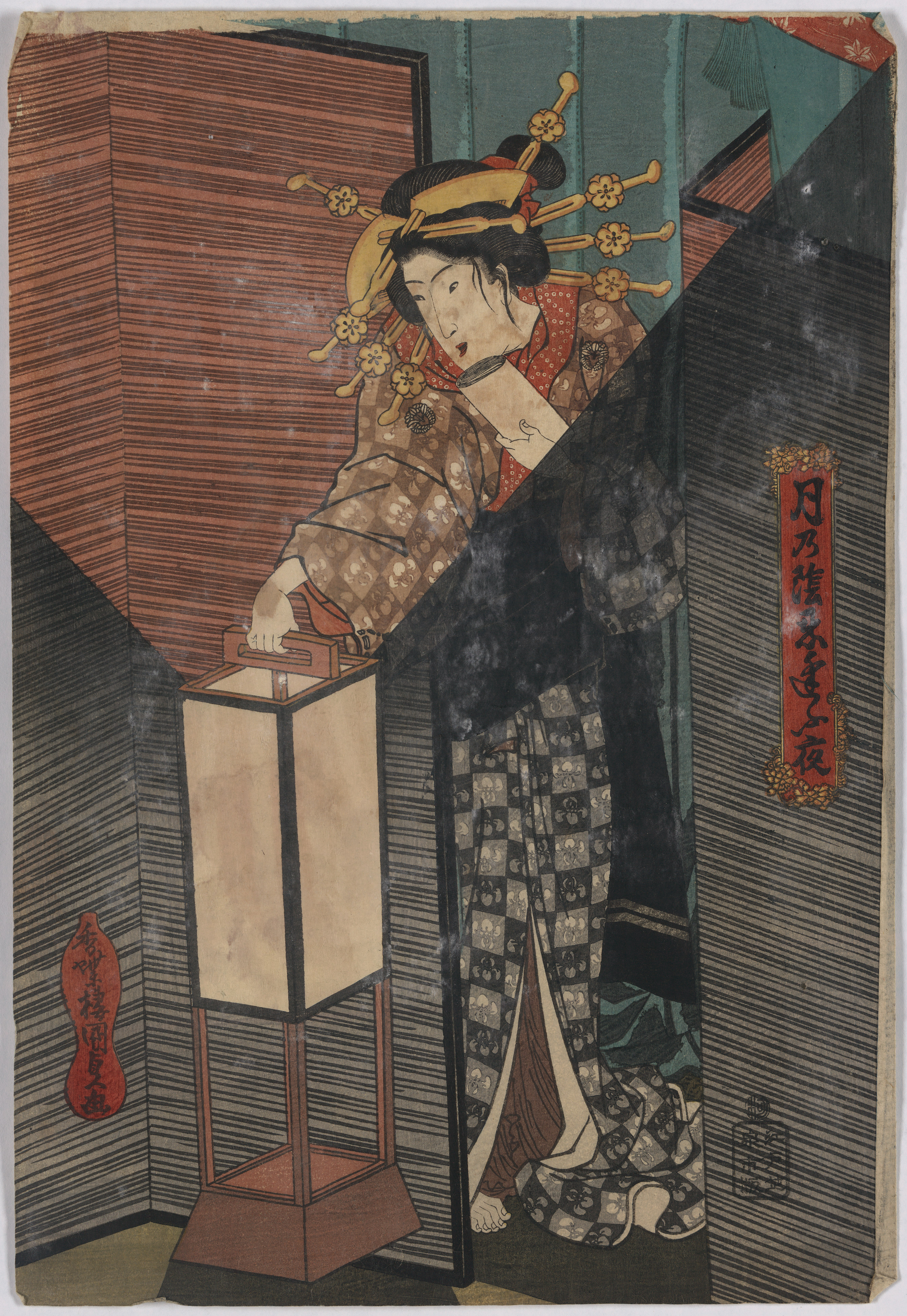
Ukiyo-e print showing an andon being carried indoors

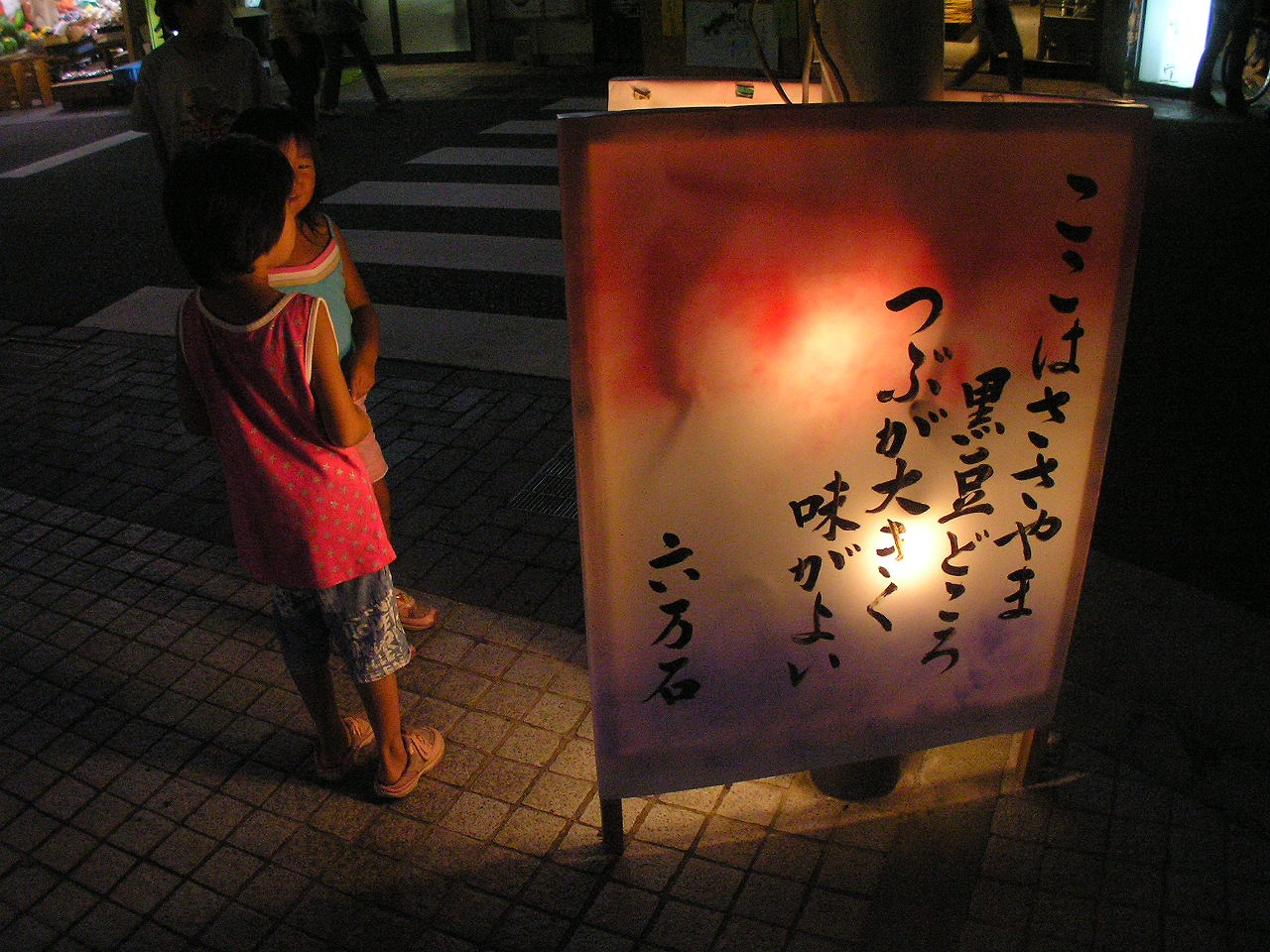
An andon standing outdoors with one side open

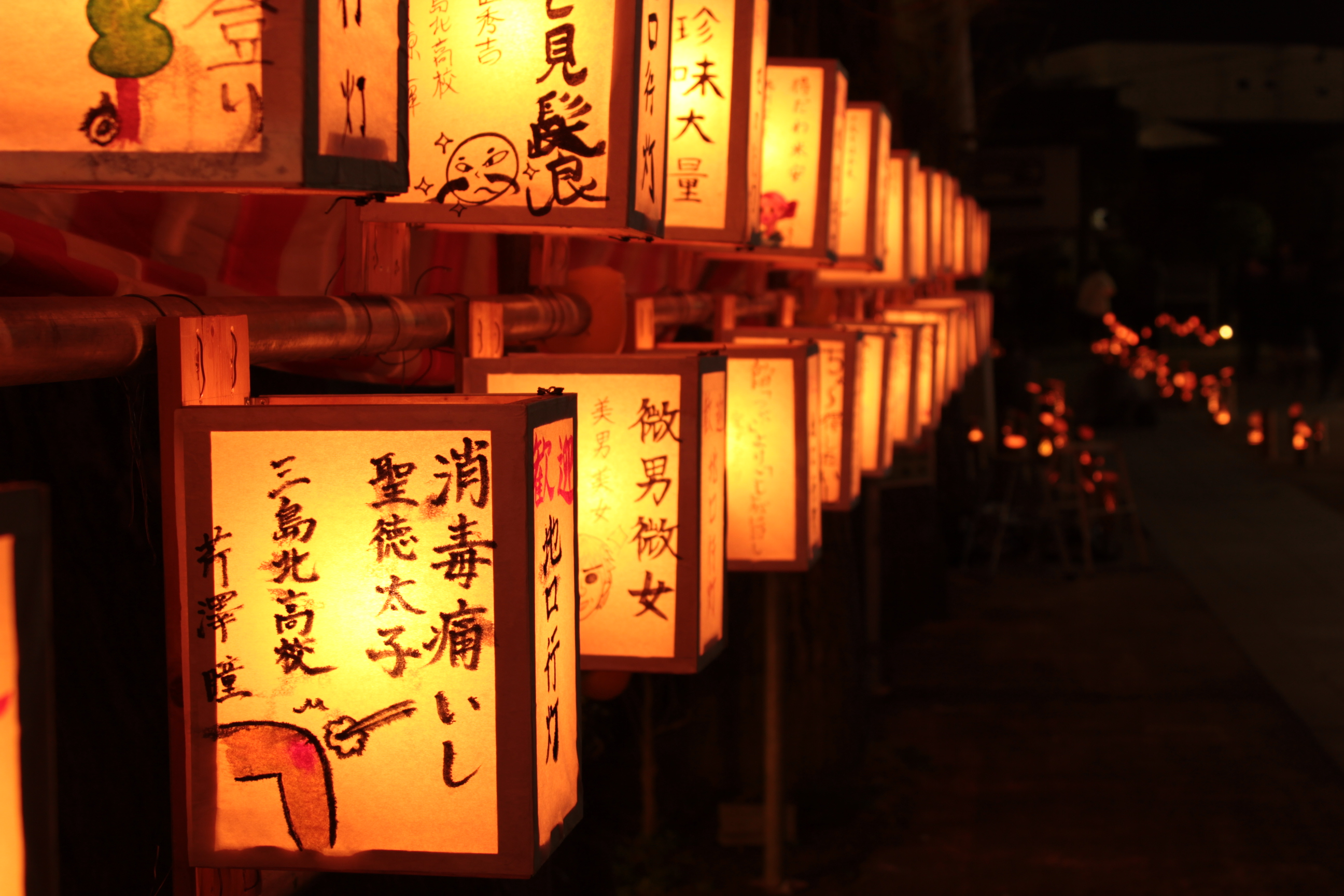
Andons hung in Mishima, Shizuoka

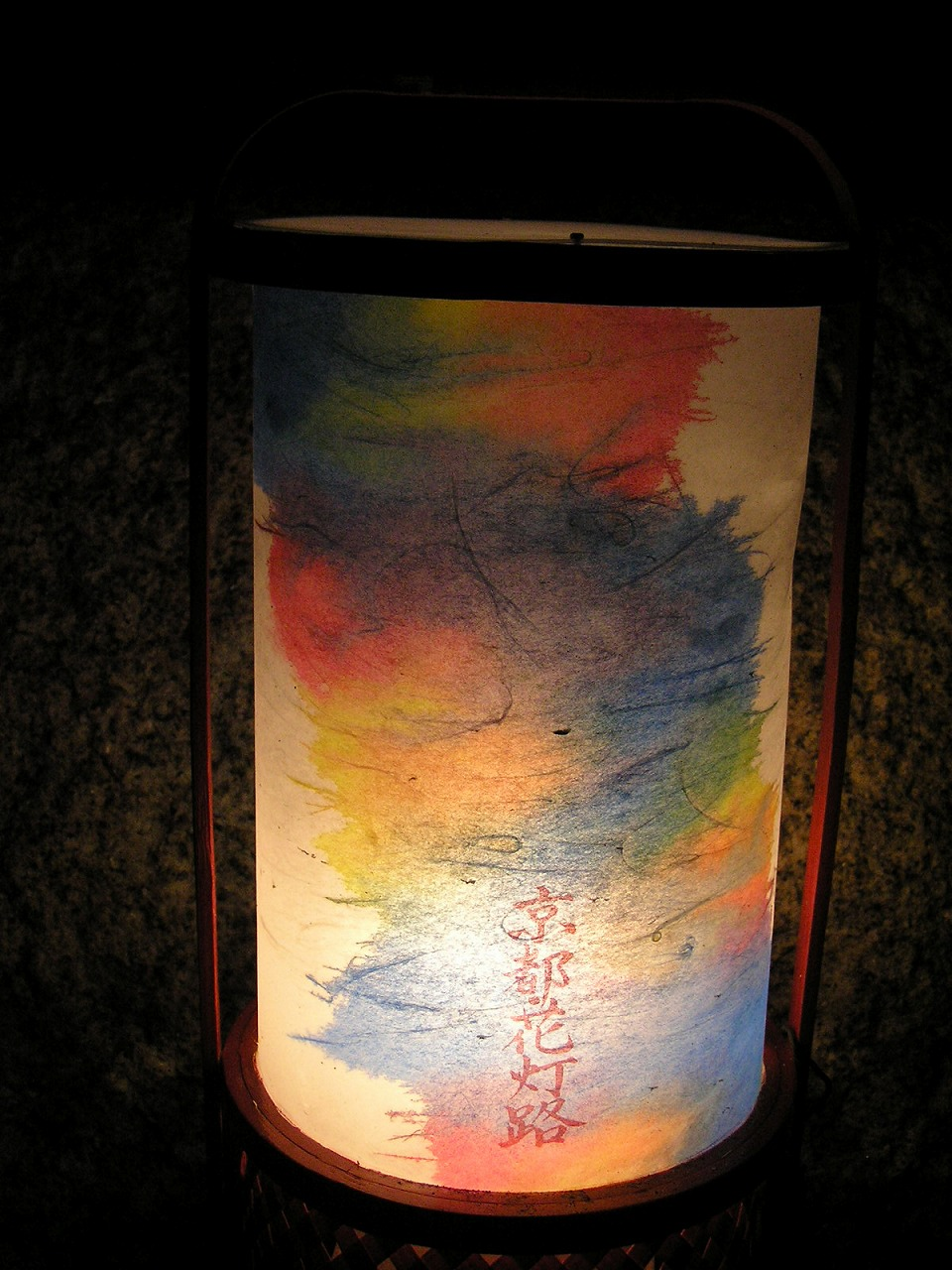
Example of a cylindrical andon at the Hanatouro Festival in Arashiyama, Kyoto

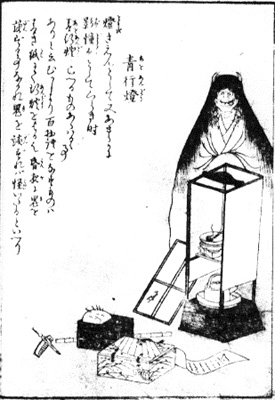
The Aoandon lit. 'blue andon' of Japanese folklore.

== Bonbori ==
The bonbori (雪洞(ぼんぼり)) is a kind of Japanese paper lamp used in the open during festivals. It normally has an hexagonal profile and a rather wide, open top. It can either hang from a wire or stand on a pole. Famous is the Bonbori Festival (ぼんぼり祭り, Bonbori Matsuri), held annually at Tsurugaoka Hachiman-gū in Kamakura, Kanagawa. Artists paint on the about 400 bonbori erected for the occasion on the shrine's grounds.

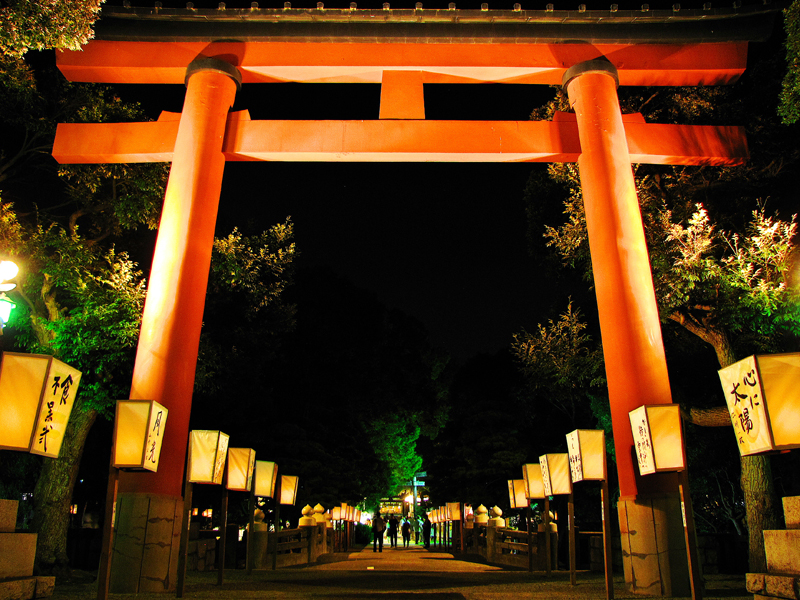
Bonbori lining the Sandō at a Bonbori Festival

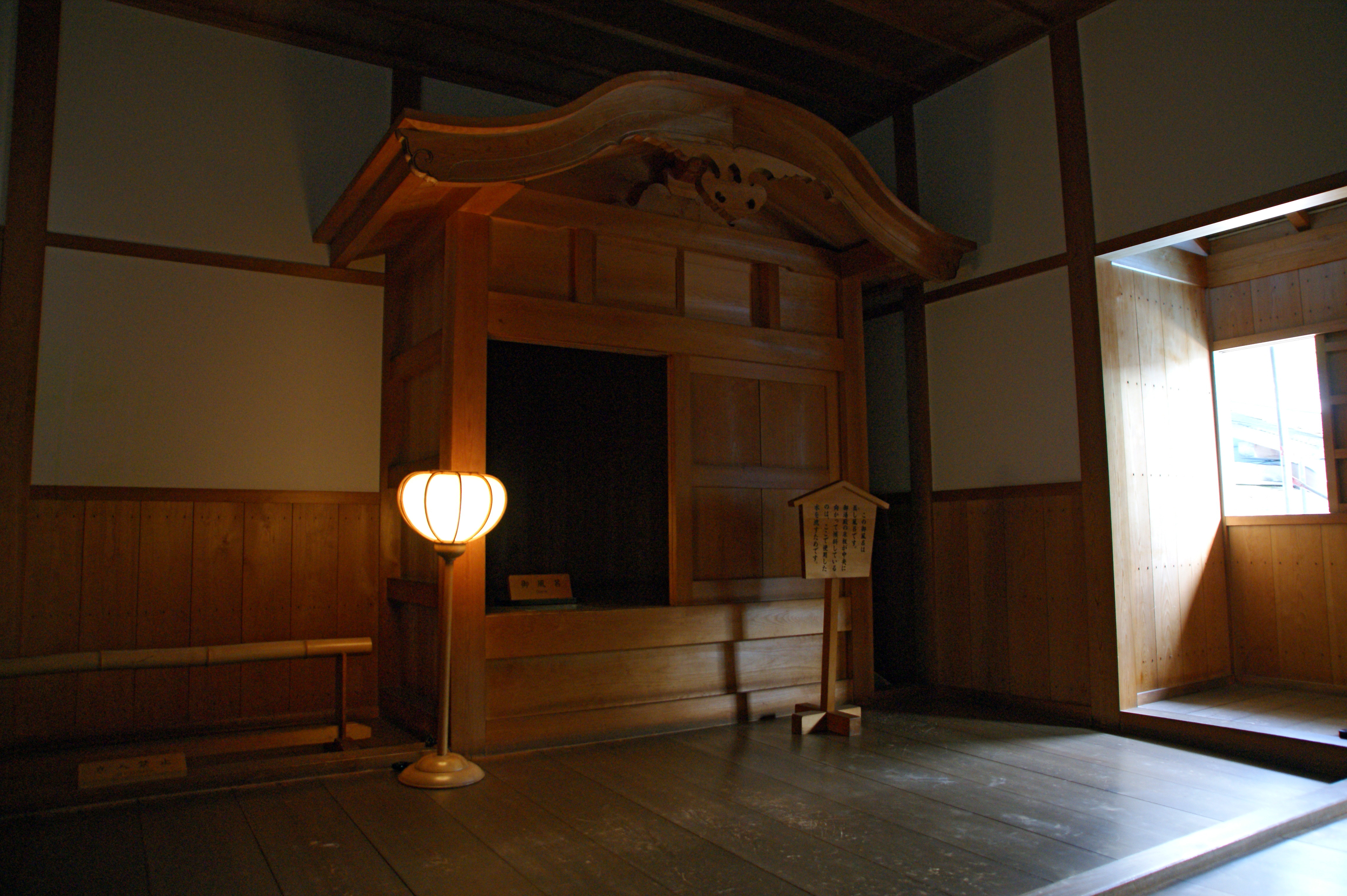
Yōkōkan Teien (養浩館庭園) in Fukui

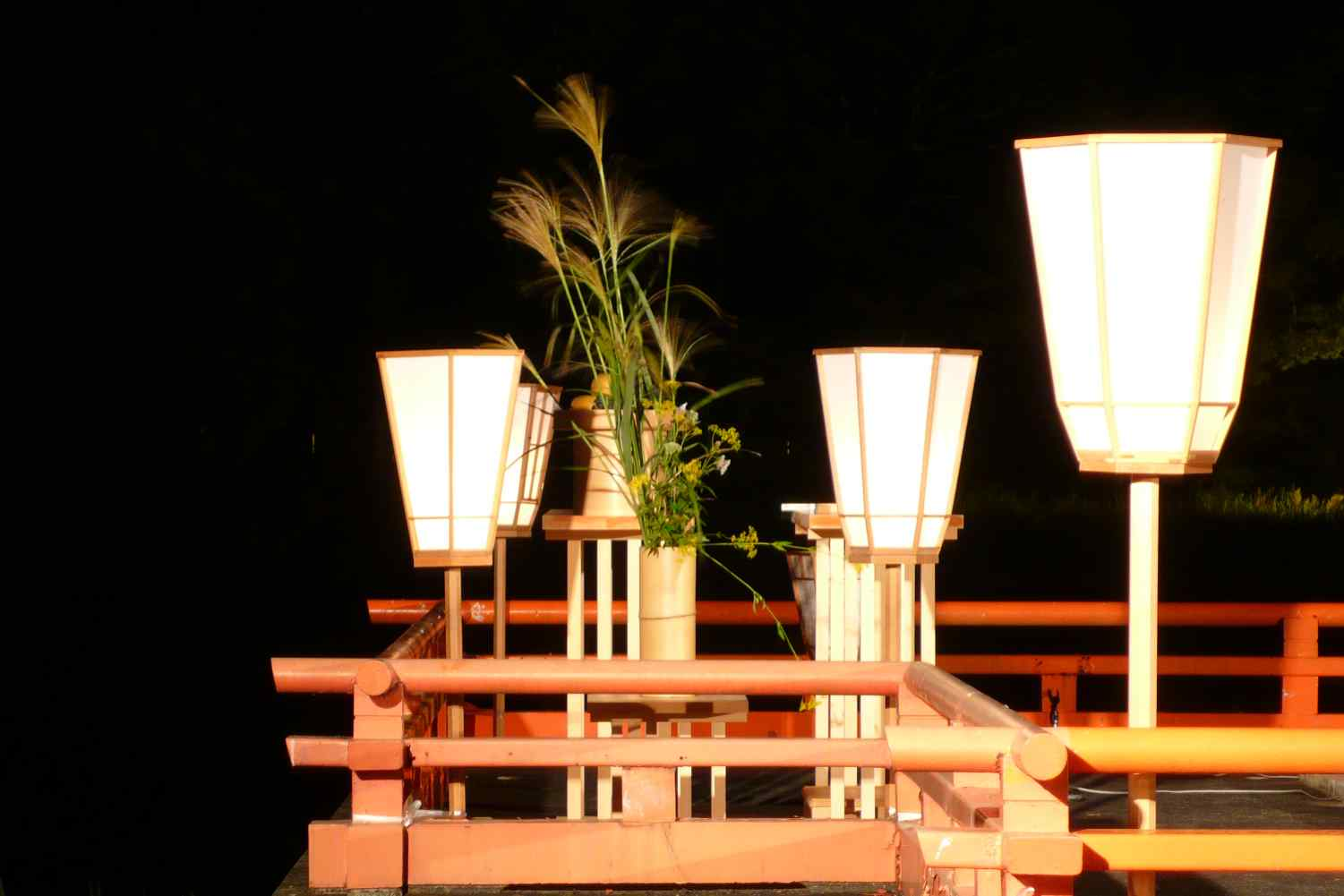
Kangetsu-kai (観月会) at Ise Jingū

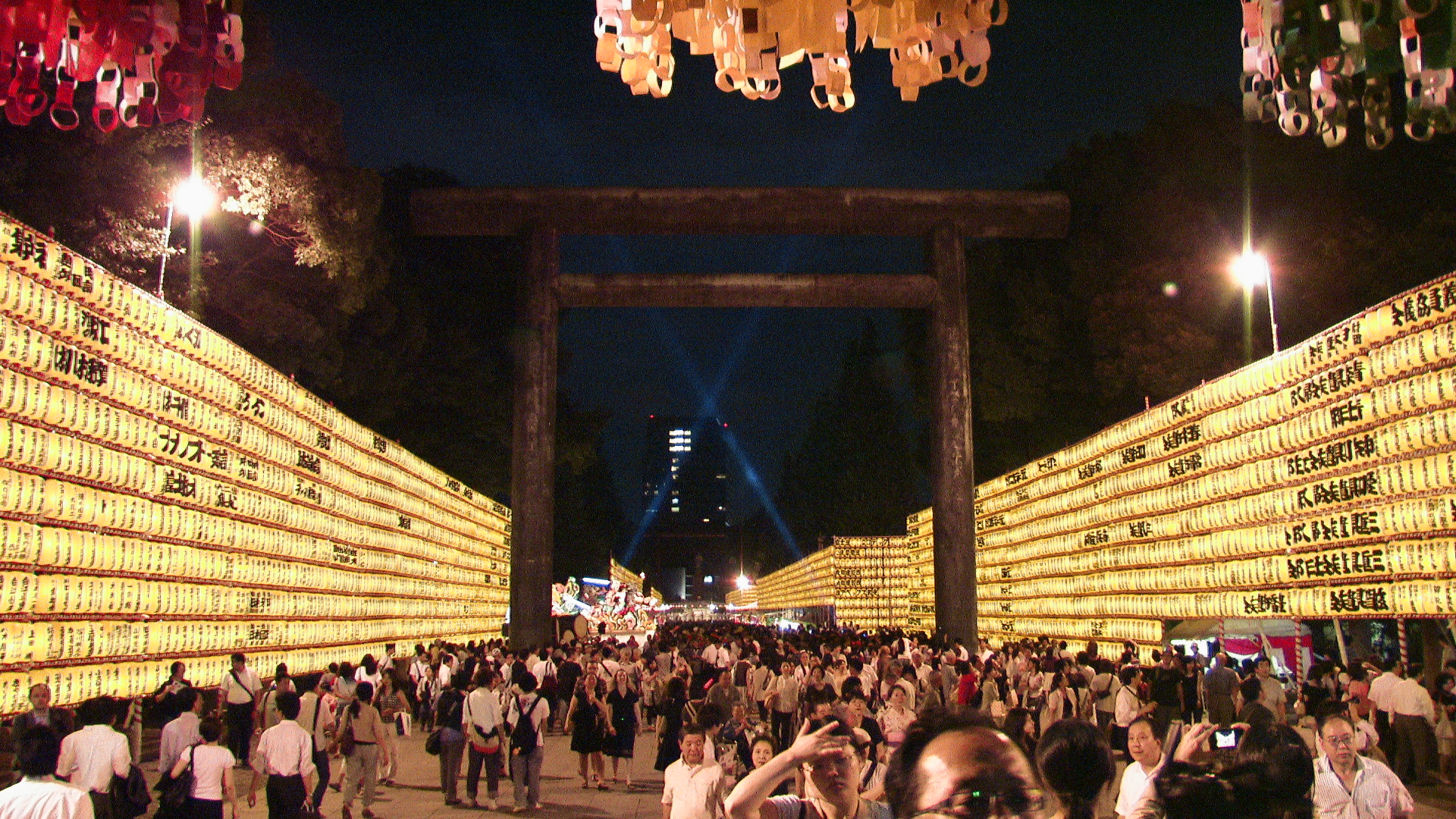
Kake-bonbori (懸雪洞) at the Mitama Matsuri festival at Yasukuni Jinja

== Chōchin ==
A relative of the Chinese paper lantern, the chōchin has a frame of split bamboo wound in a spiral. Paper or silk protect the flame from wind. The spiral structure permits it to be collapsed into the basket at the bottom. The chōchin is used outdoors, either carried or hung outside the house. In present-day Japan, plastic chōchin with electric bulbs are produced as novelties, souvenirs, and for matsuri and events. The earliest record of a chōchin dates to 1085, and one appears in a 1536 illustration.

The akachōchin, or red lantern, marks an izakaya. In Japanese folklore, the chochin appears as a yōkai, the chōchin-obake.

Gifu is known for its Gifu lanterns, a kind of chōchin made from mino washi.

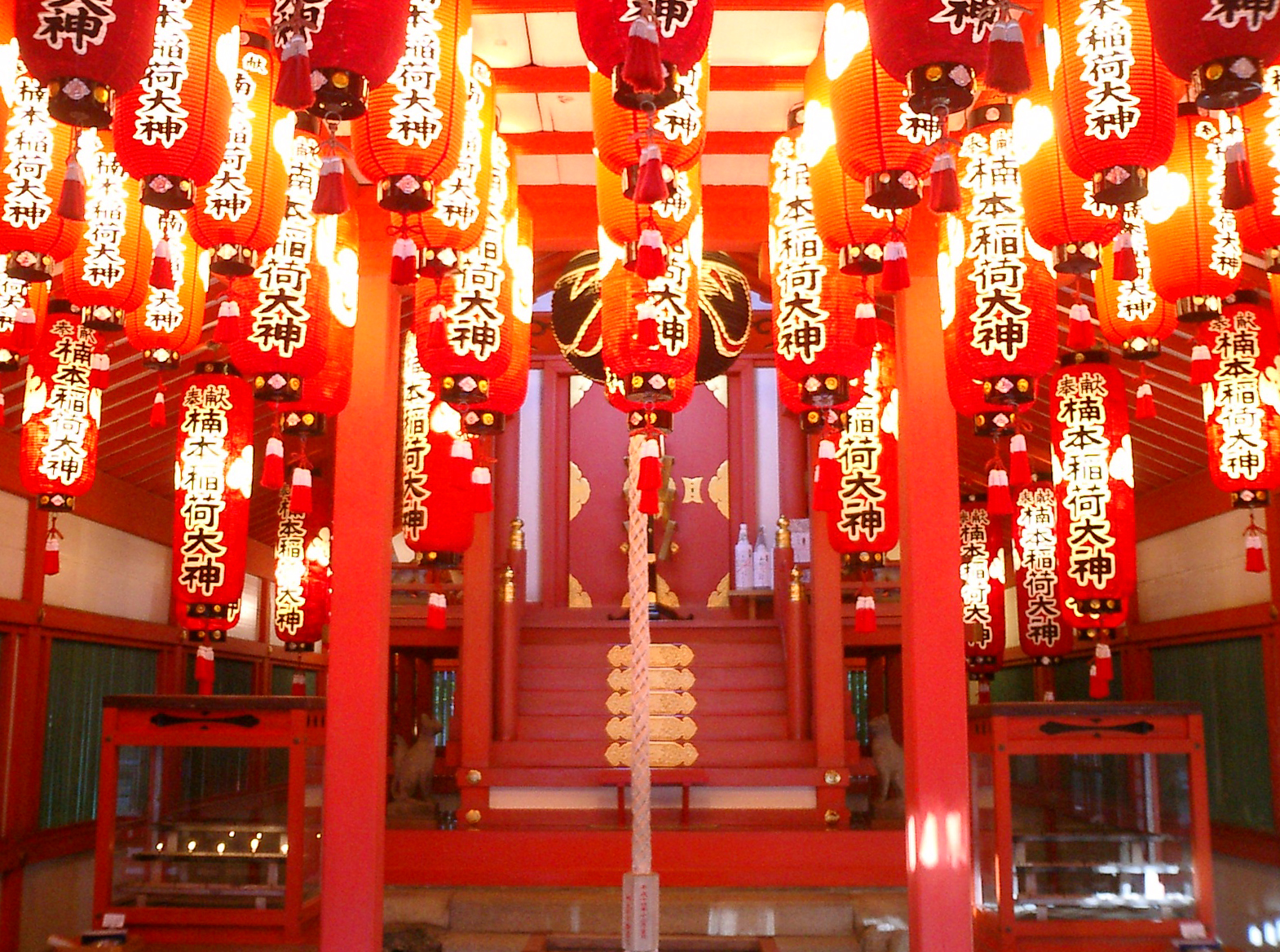
Chōchin at Minatogawa Shrine in Kōbe

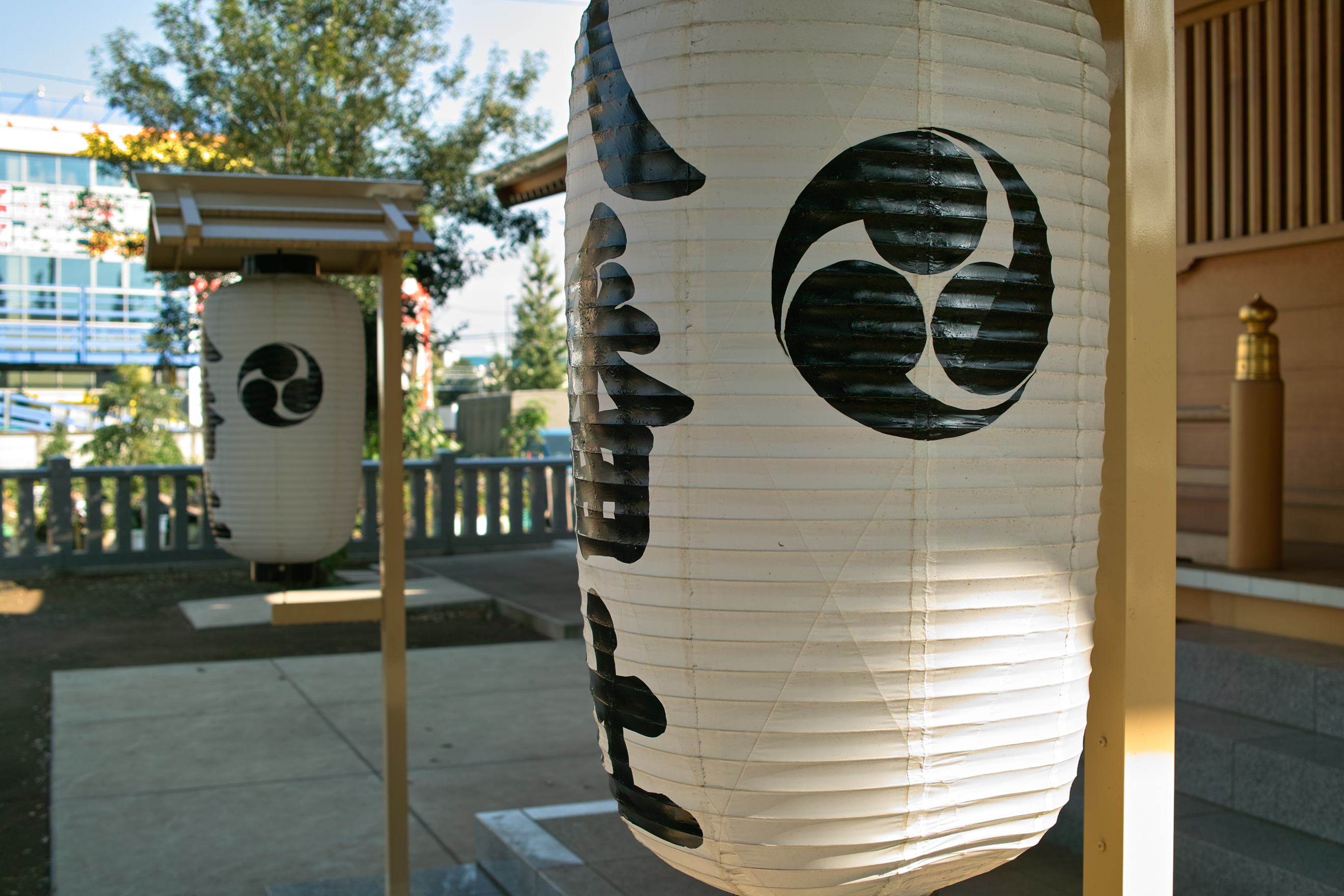
White chōchin decorated with tomoe

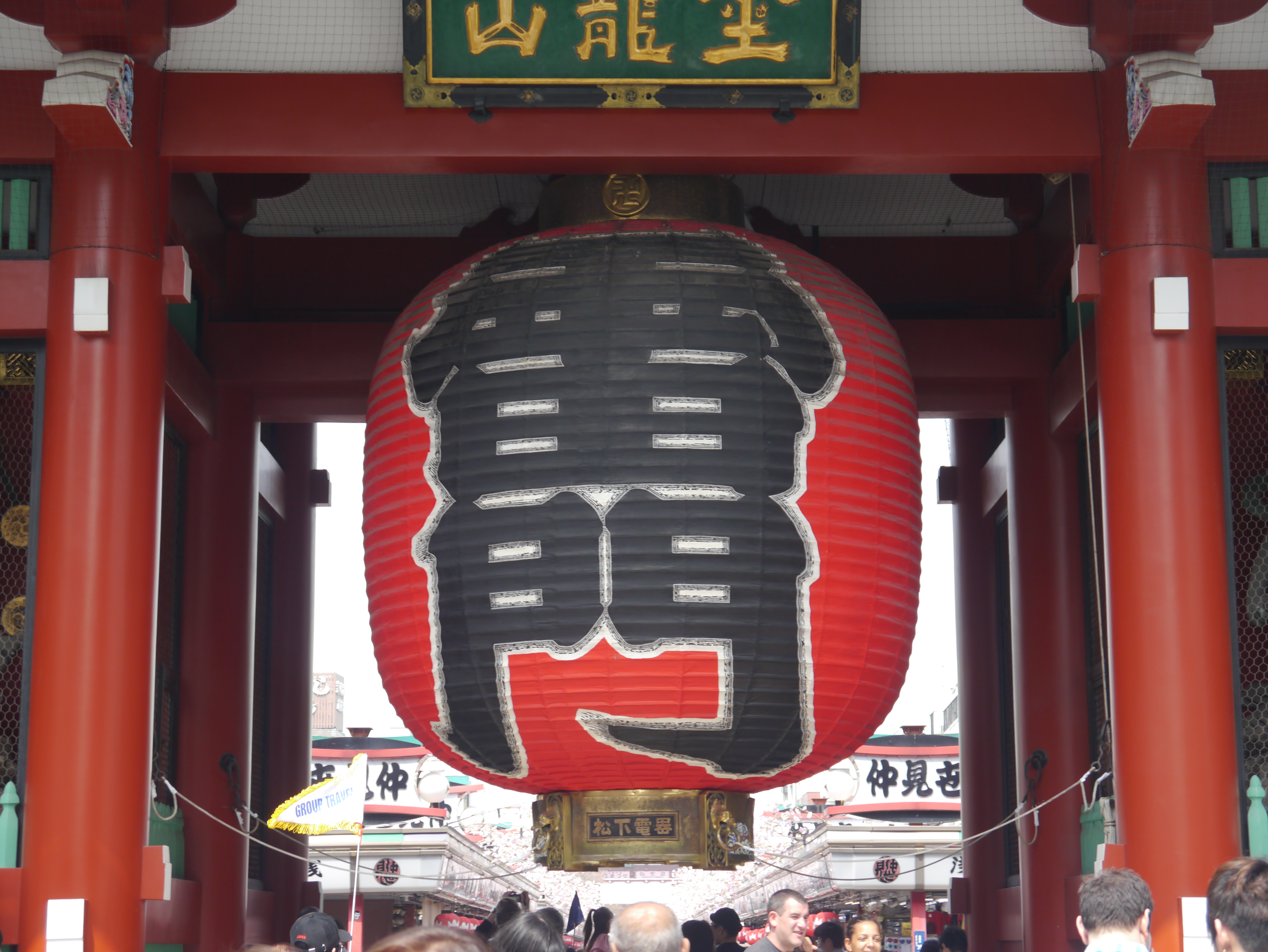
Oversized chōchin at the Kaminarimon in Sensō-ji

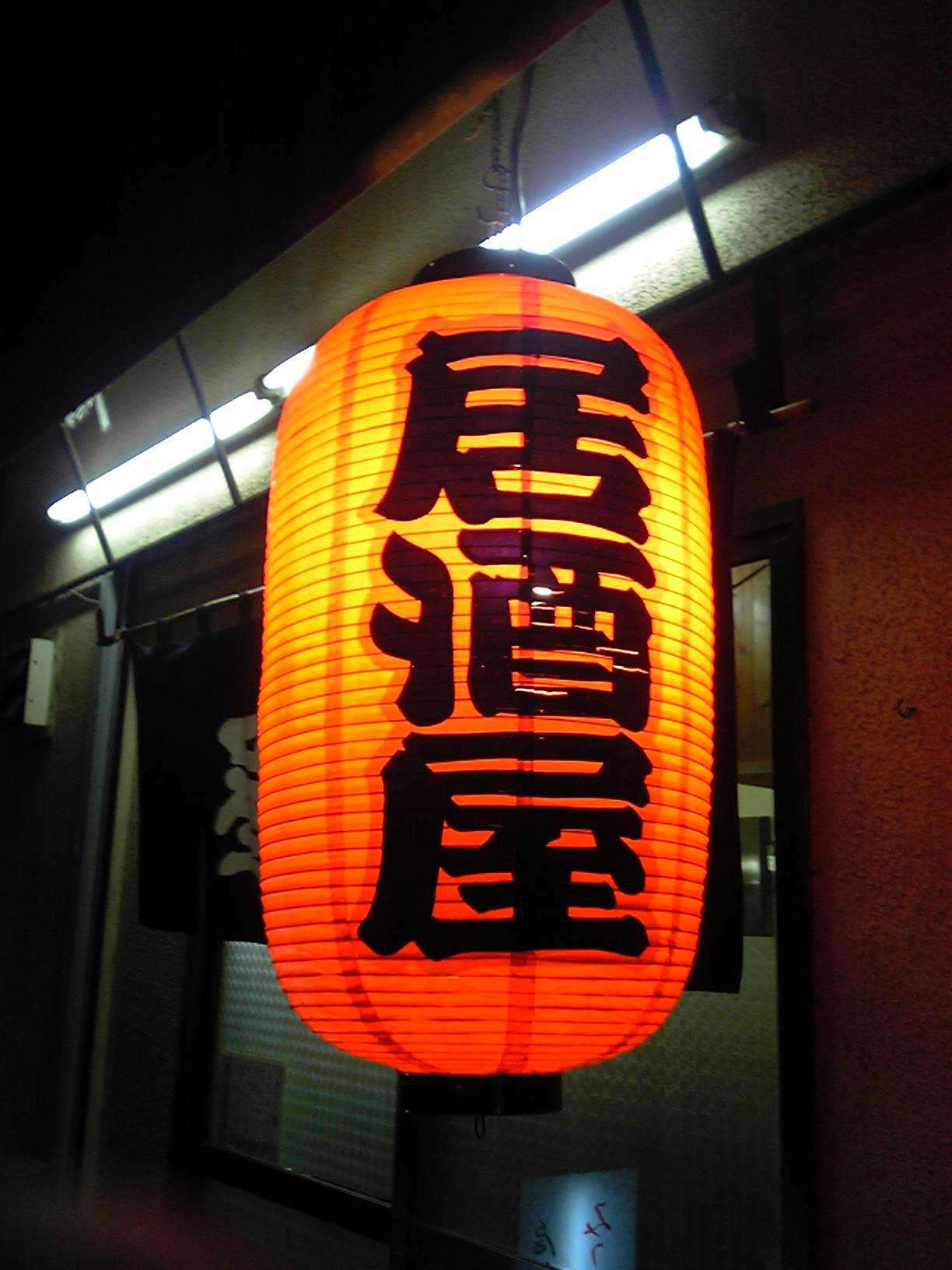
Akachōchin lantern outside an izakaya

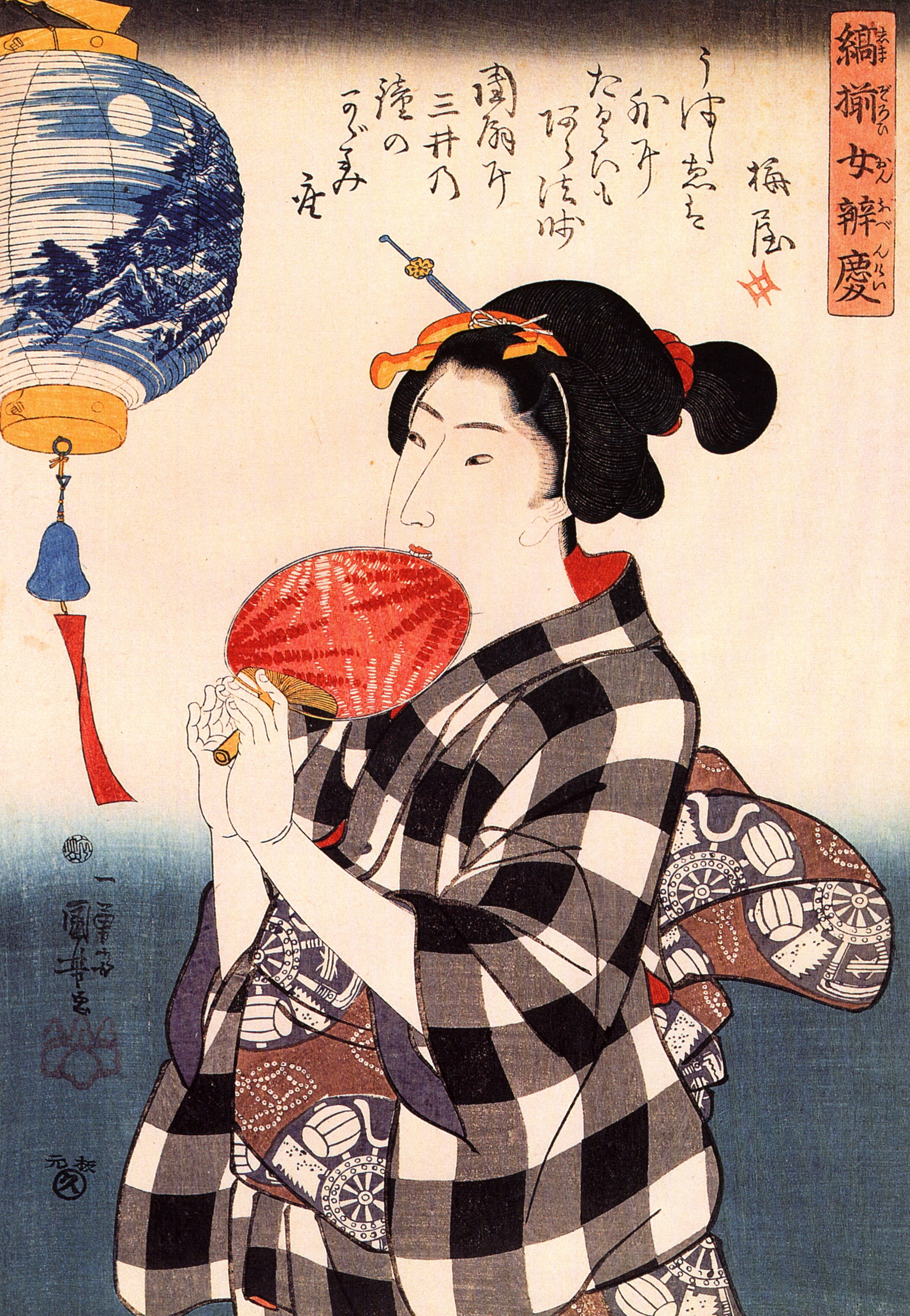
Ukiyo-e print by Utagawa Kuniyoshi showing a chōchin decorated with a landscape

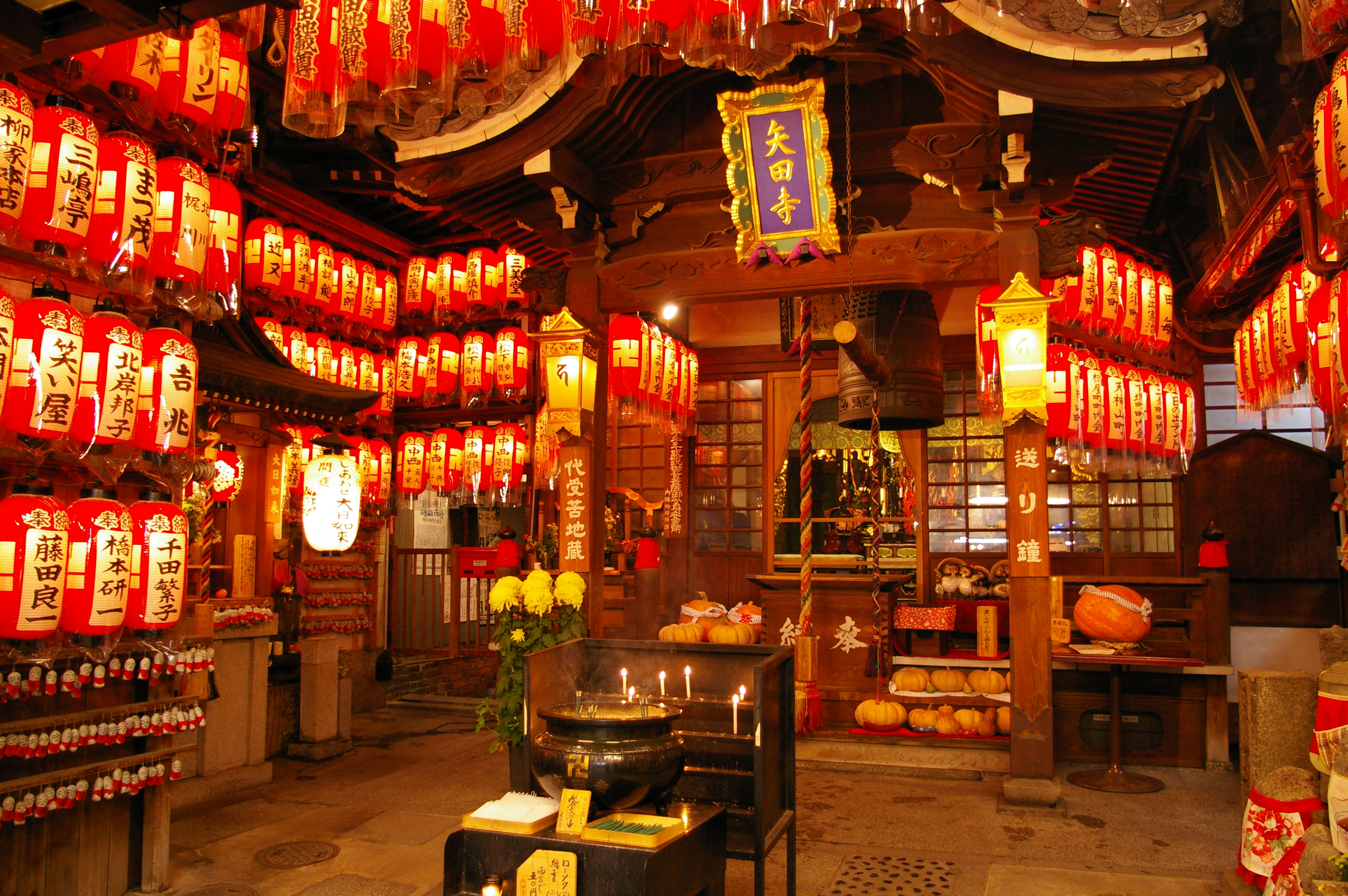
Yata-dera (矢田寺) Temple in Kyōto

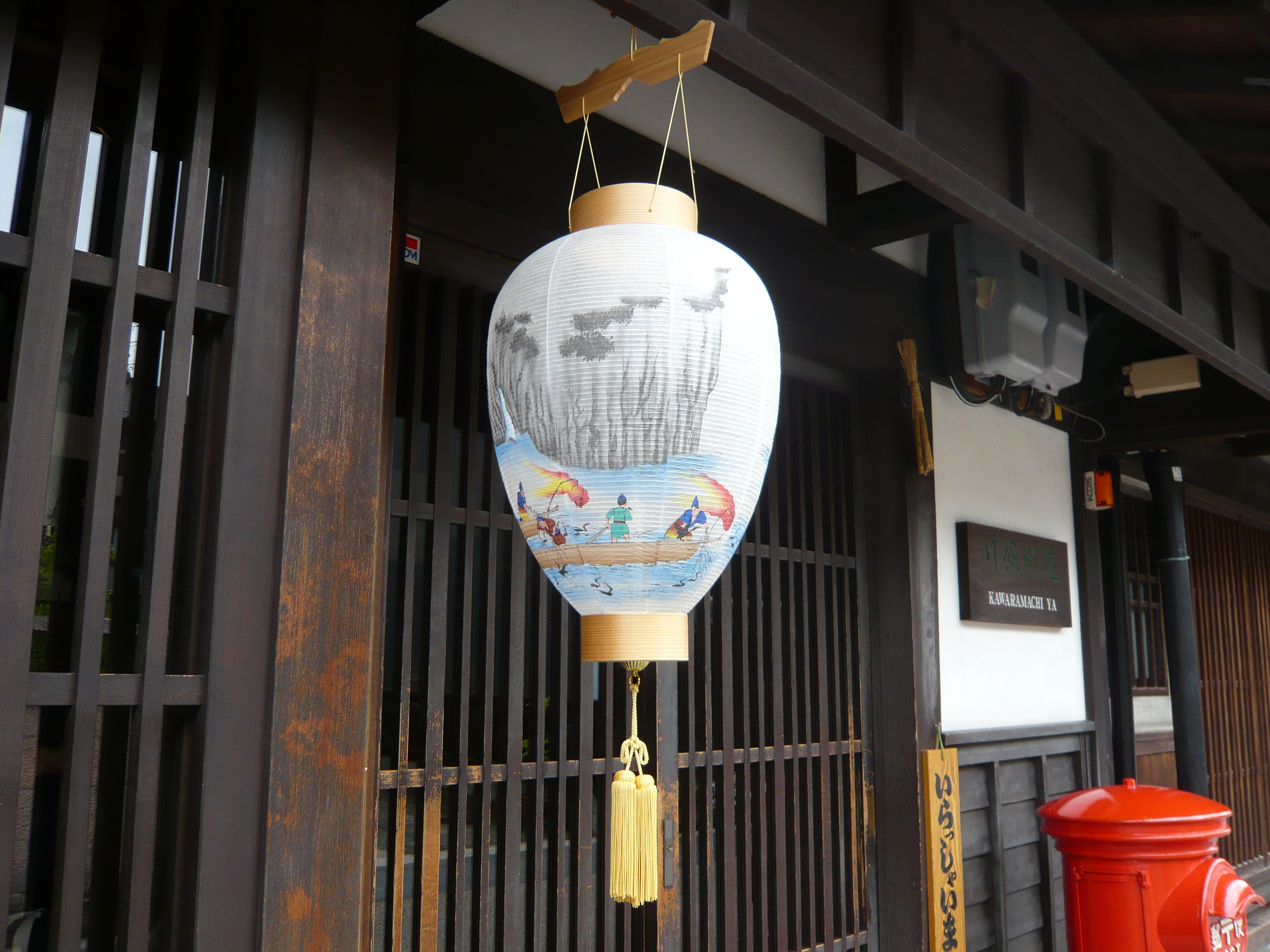
Gifu chōchin

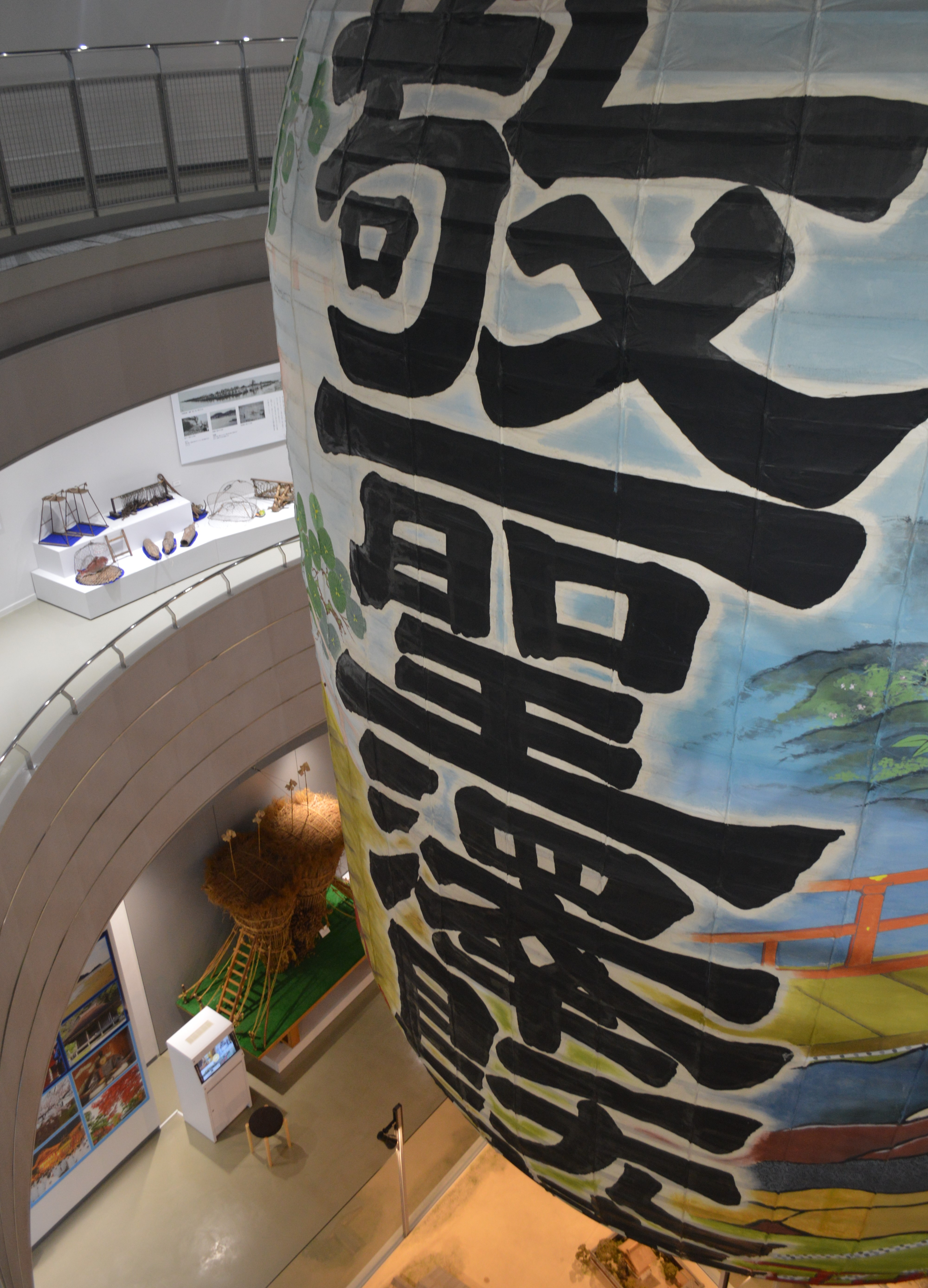
Massive chōchin at Isshiki Manabi no Yakata museum

== Tōrō ==
Originally used in the broad sense to mean any lantern, the term tōrō came to refer to a lamp of stone, bronze, iron, wood, or another heavy material. These illuminate the grounds of Buddhist temples, Shinto shrines, Japanese gardens, and other places that include tradition in their decor. The earlier use of oil and candles has in the modern day been replaced by electric bulbs.

=== Bronze tōrō ===
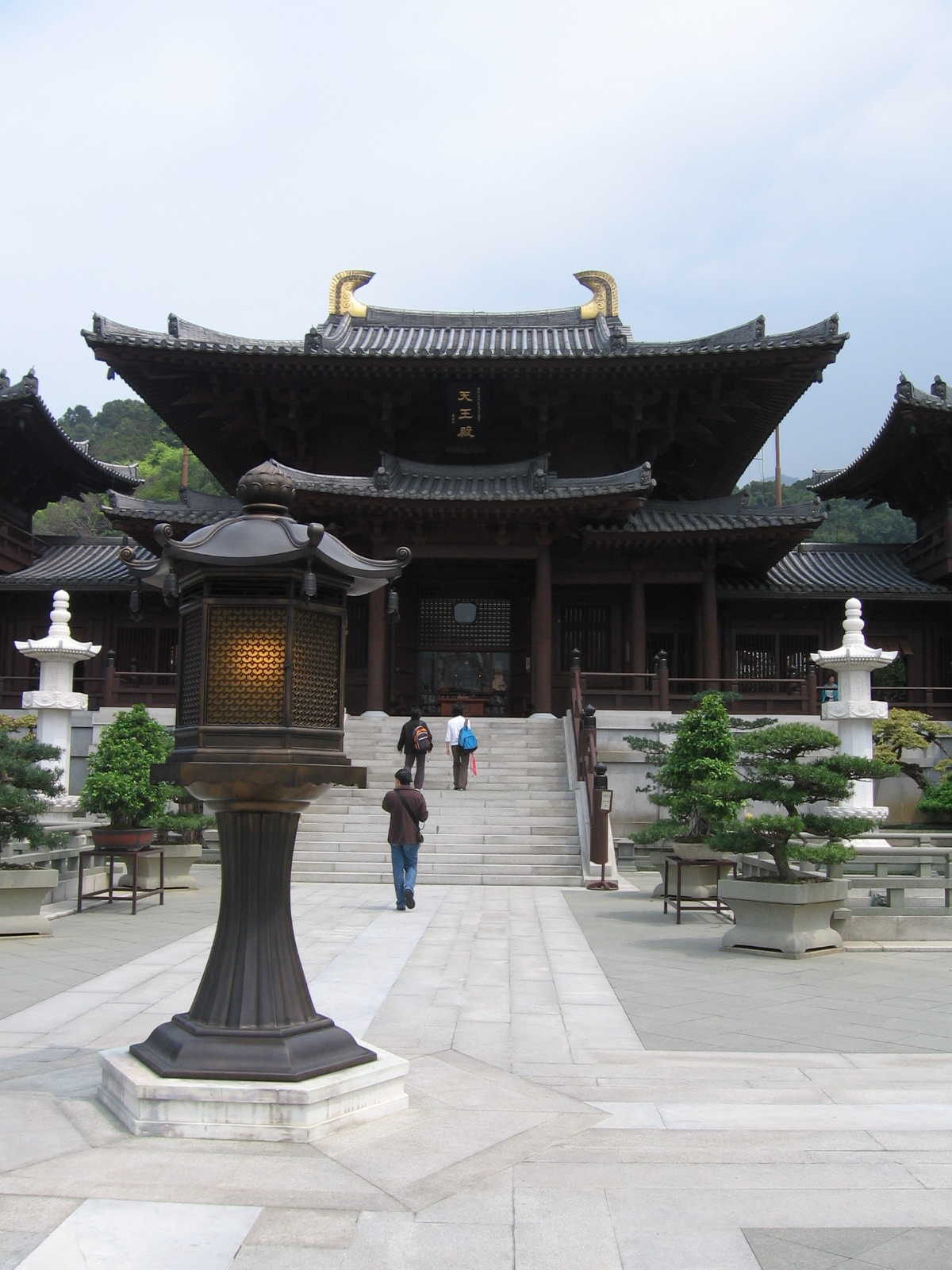
Bronze and stone lanterns in Chi Lin Nunnery, Hongkong

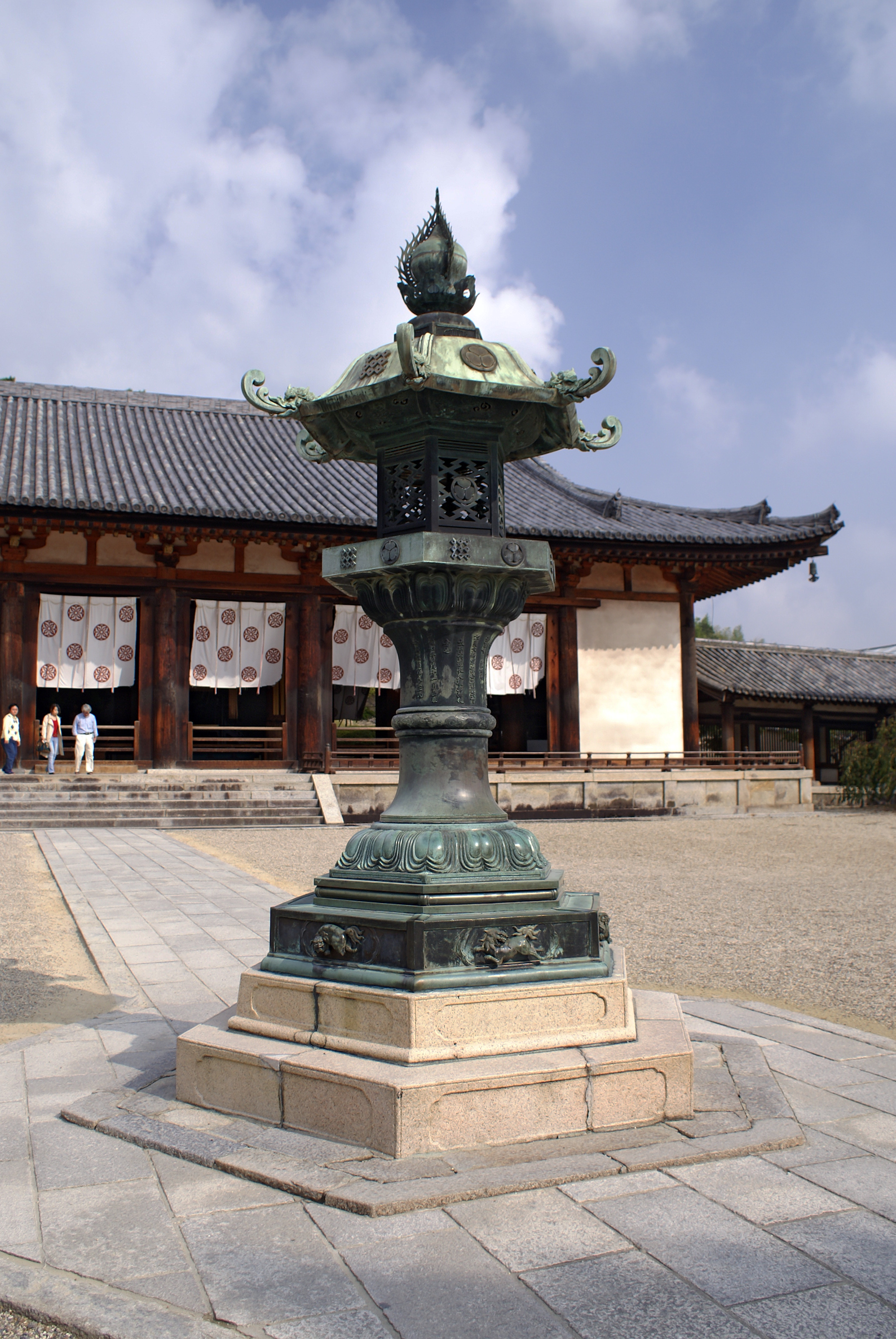
Bronze lantern at Hōryū-ji

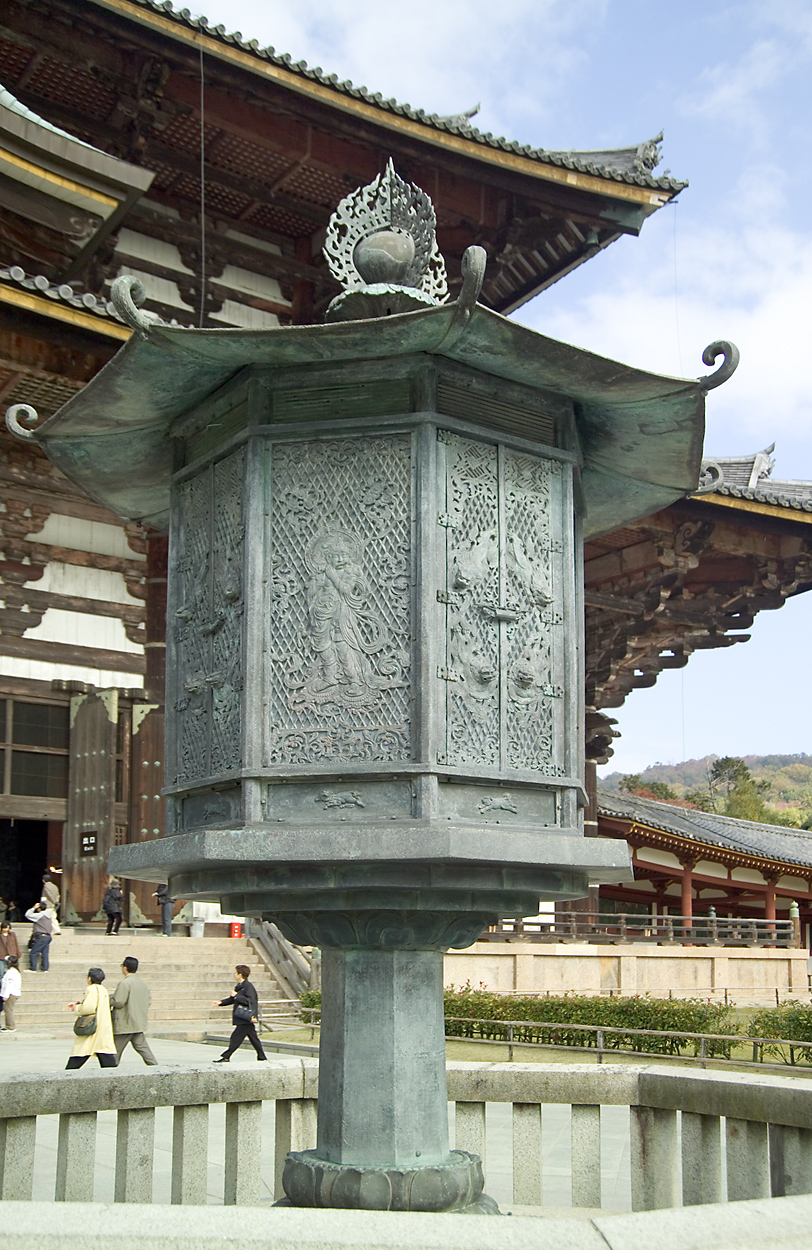
8th century bronze lantern at Tōdai-ji (National Treasure)

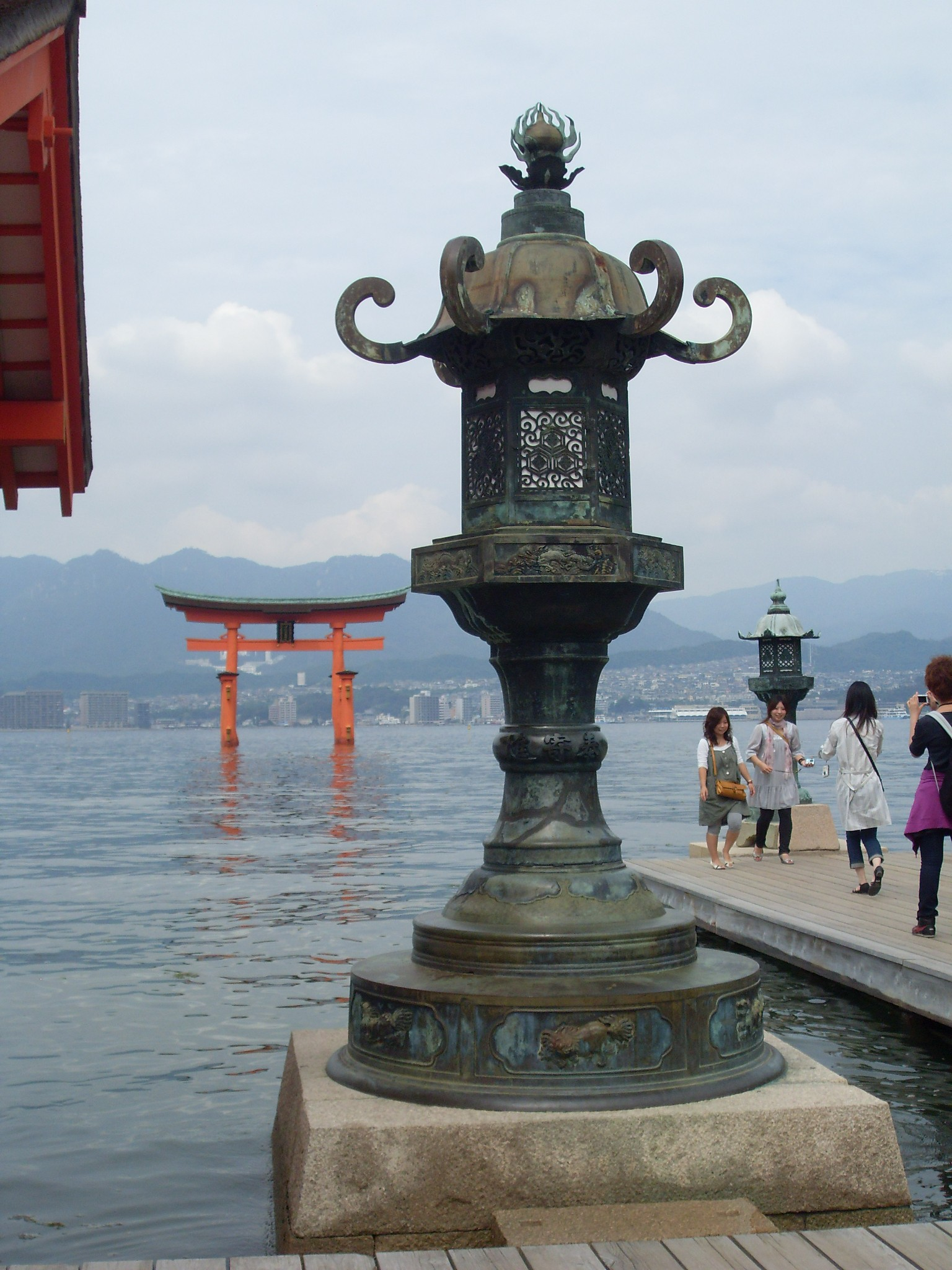
Bronze lantern at Itsukushima Shrine

=== Stone tōrō ===
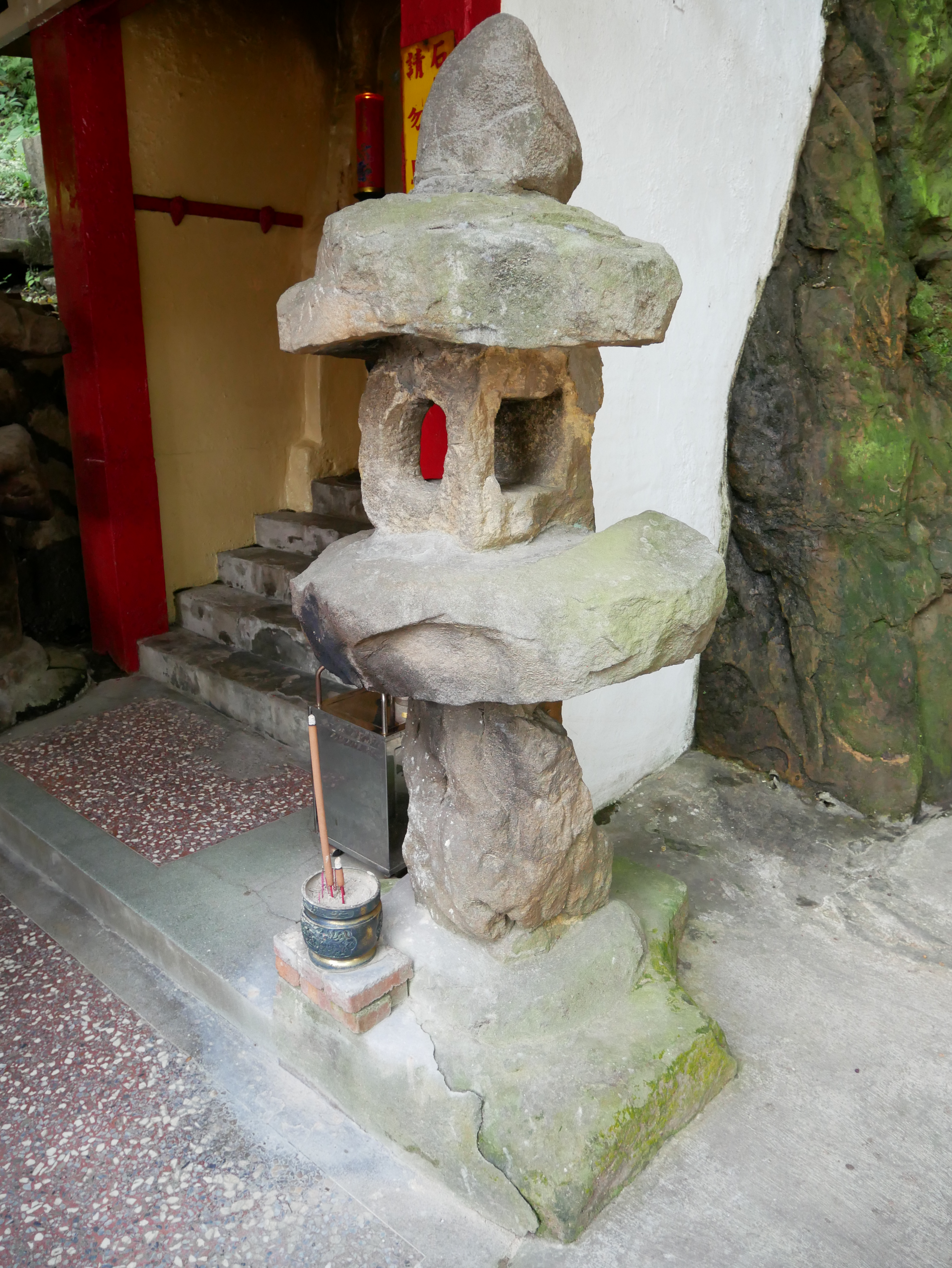
Stone lantern in Taiwan

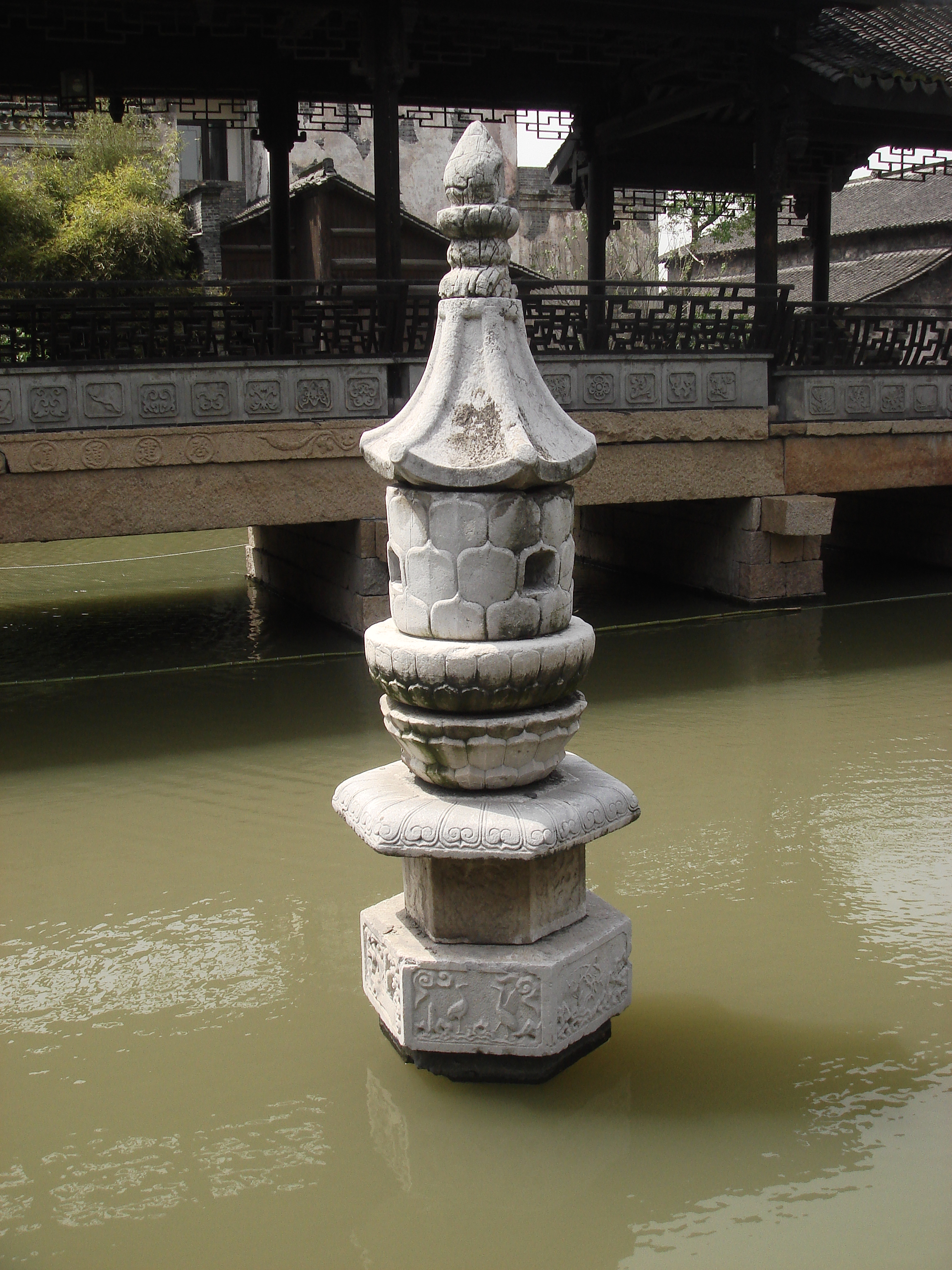
Water lantern in Zhejiang Province

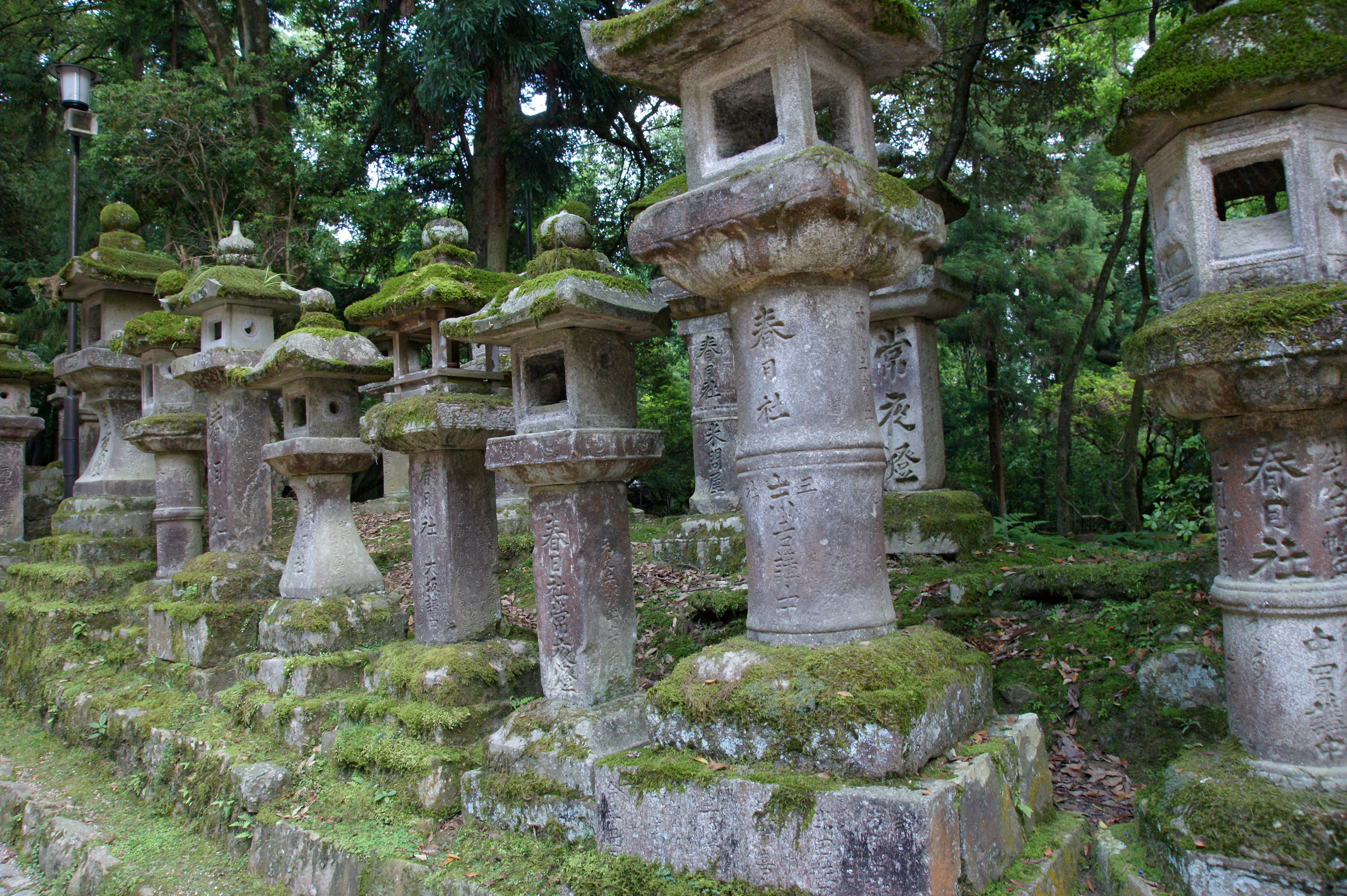
Tachi-dōrō of the kasuga-dōrō type

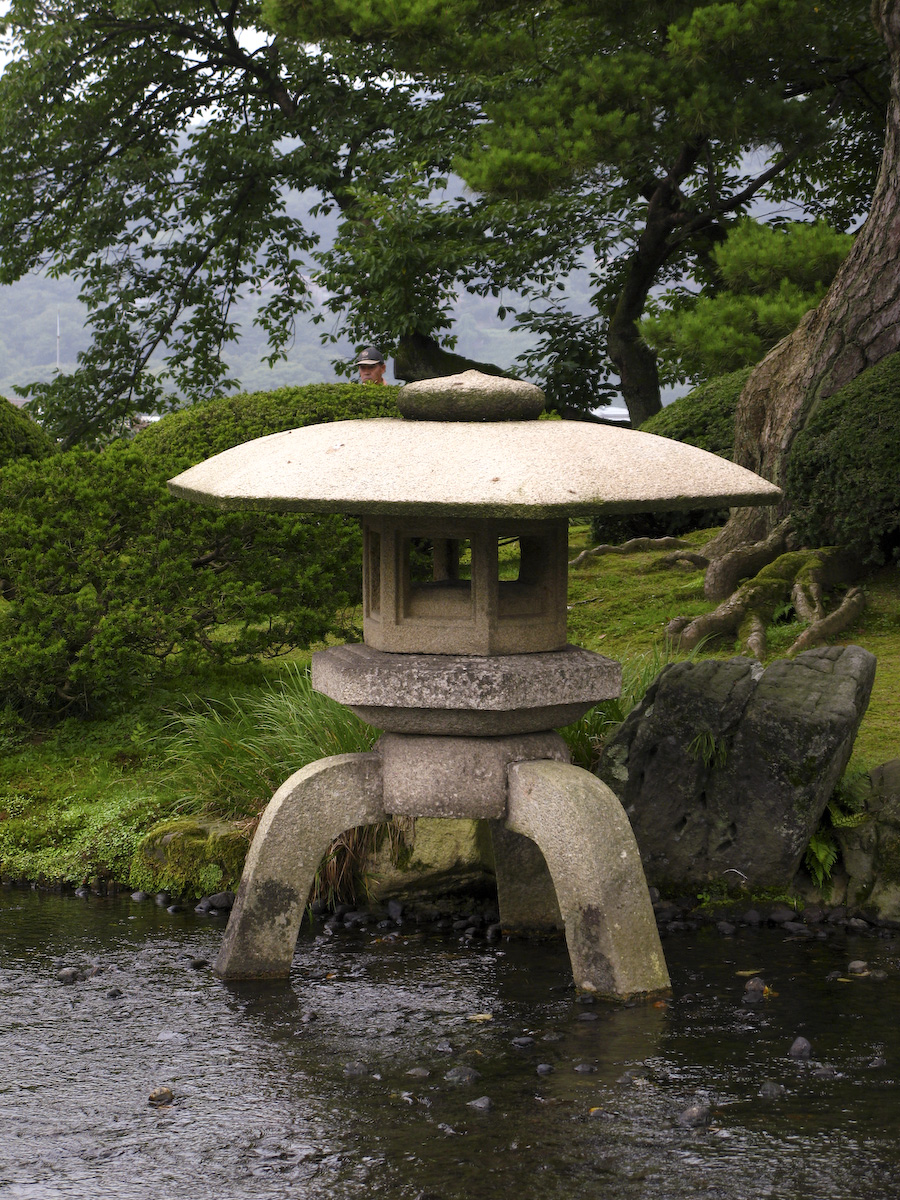
Three legged yukimi-dōrō. One leg rests on ground, two in water.

=== Wooden tōrō ===
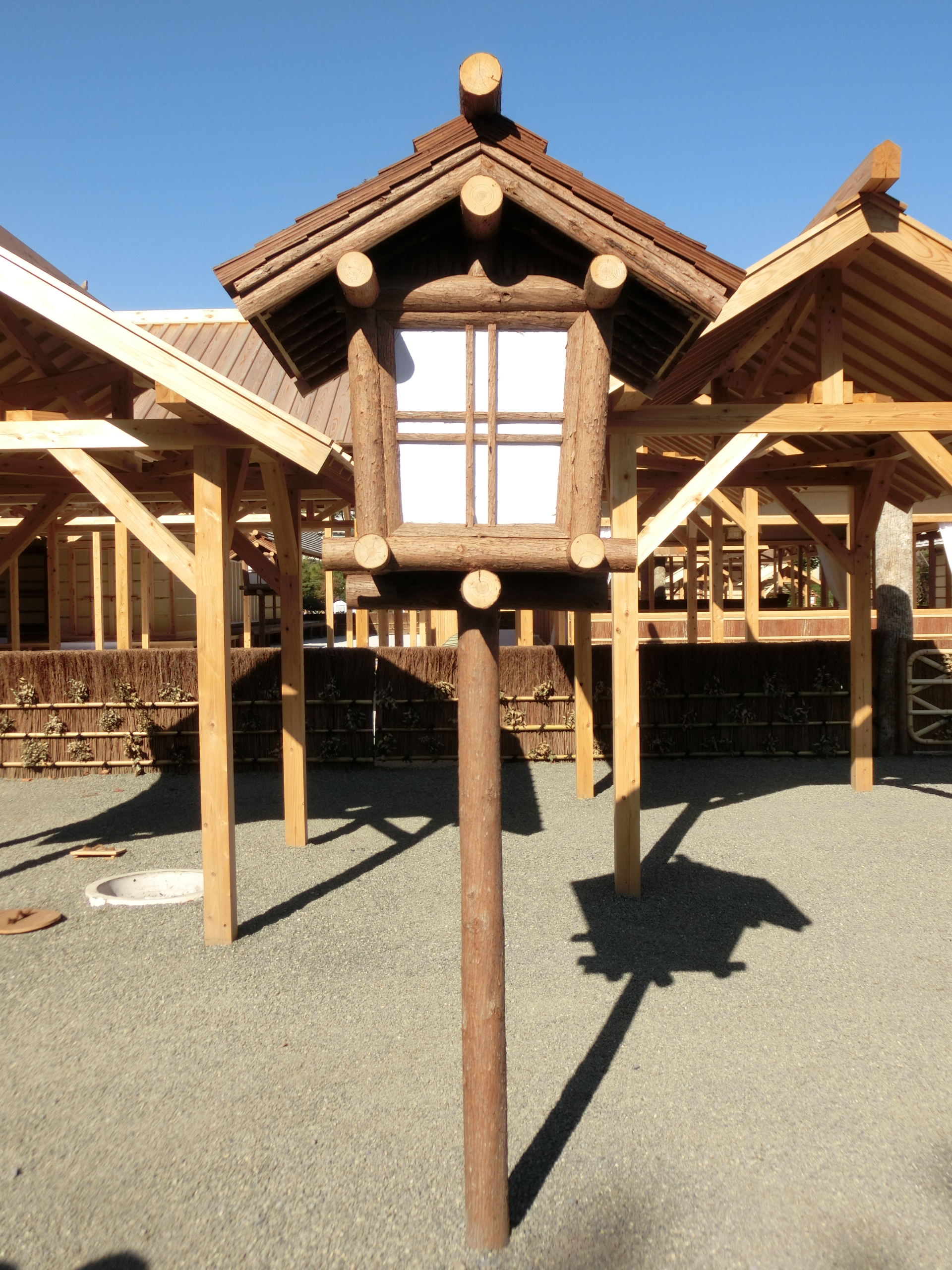
Wooden tōrō (黒木灯籠)

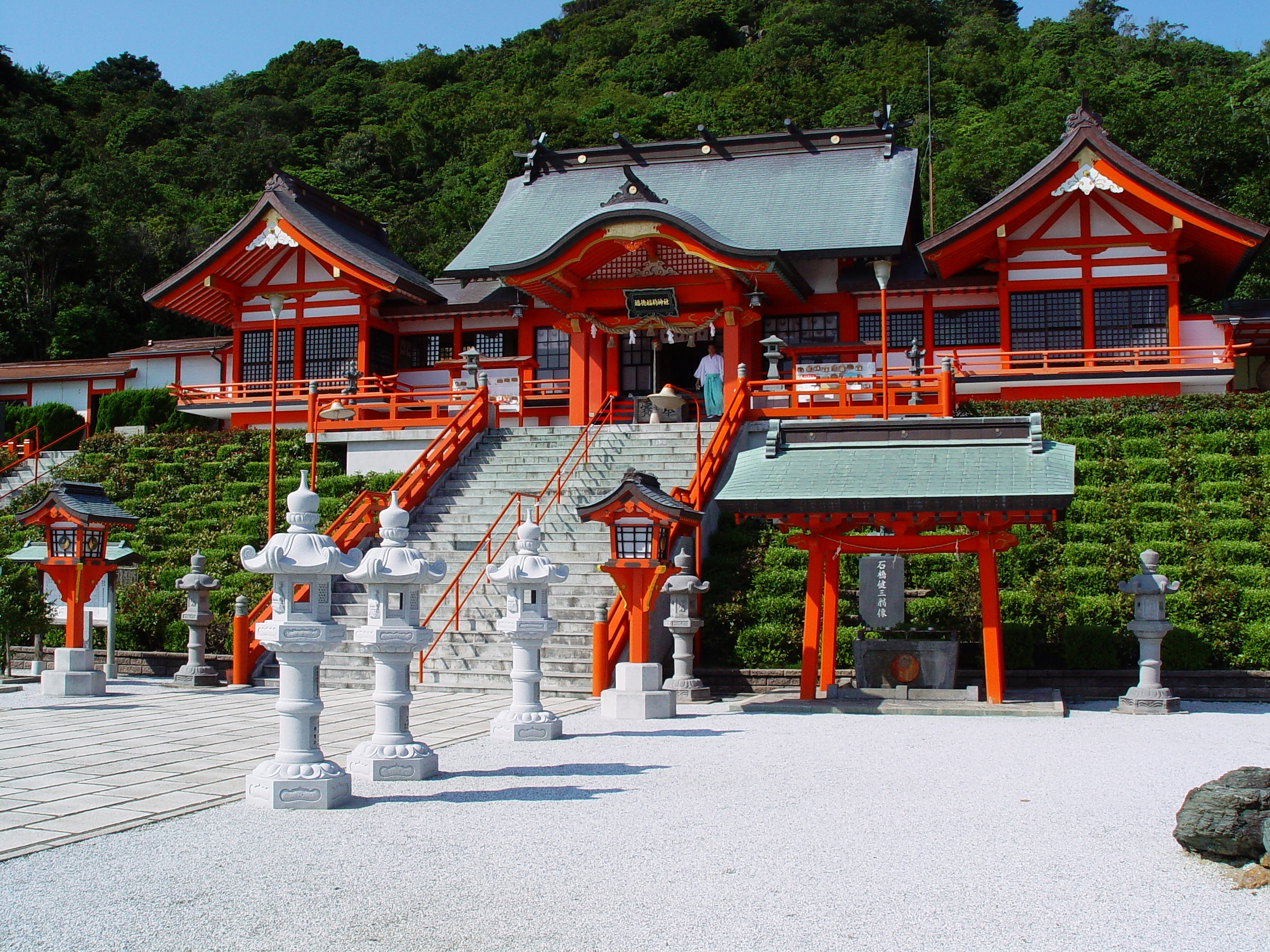
Wooden tōrō placed between stone tōrō at Fukutokuinari shrine

== See also ==
- Physalis alkekengi, the lantern plant
- Water lantern
- Gandō
