= Kando =

Kando may refer to:

- Jiandao, China, Kando (간도) in Korean
- Kando, Burkina Faso, a village in Burkina Faso
- Kálmán Kandó a Hungarian engineer and inventor of the Kandó system of railway electrification
- Yoko Kando (born 1974), Japanese swimmer

== See also ==
- Gando (disambiguation)
