= Gando, Zanzibar =

Village in Zanzibar, Tanzania

Coordinates: 4°59′S 39°42′E

Gando is a village on the Zanzibari island of Pemba. It is located on the northwest coast of the island, seven kilometres northwest of Wete. The island of Njao lies immediately to the west of the village.
