= Gandō =

Japanese lantern

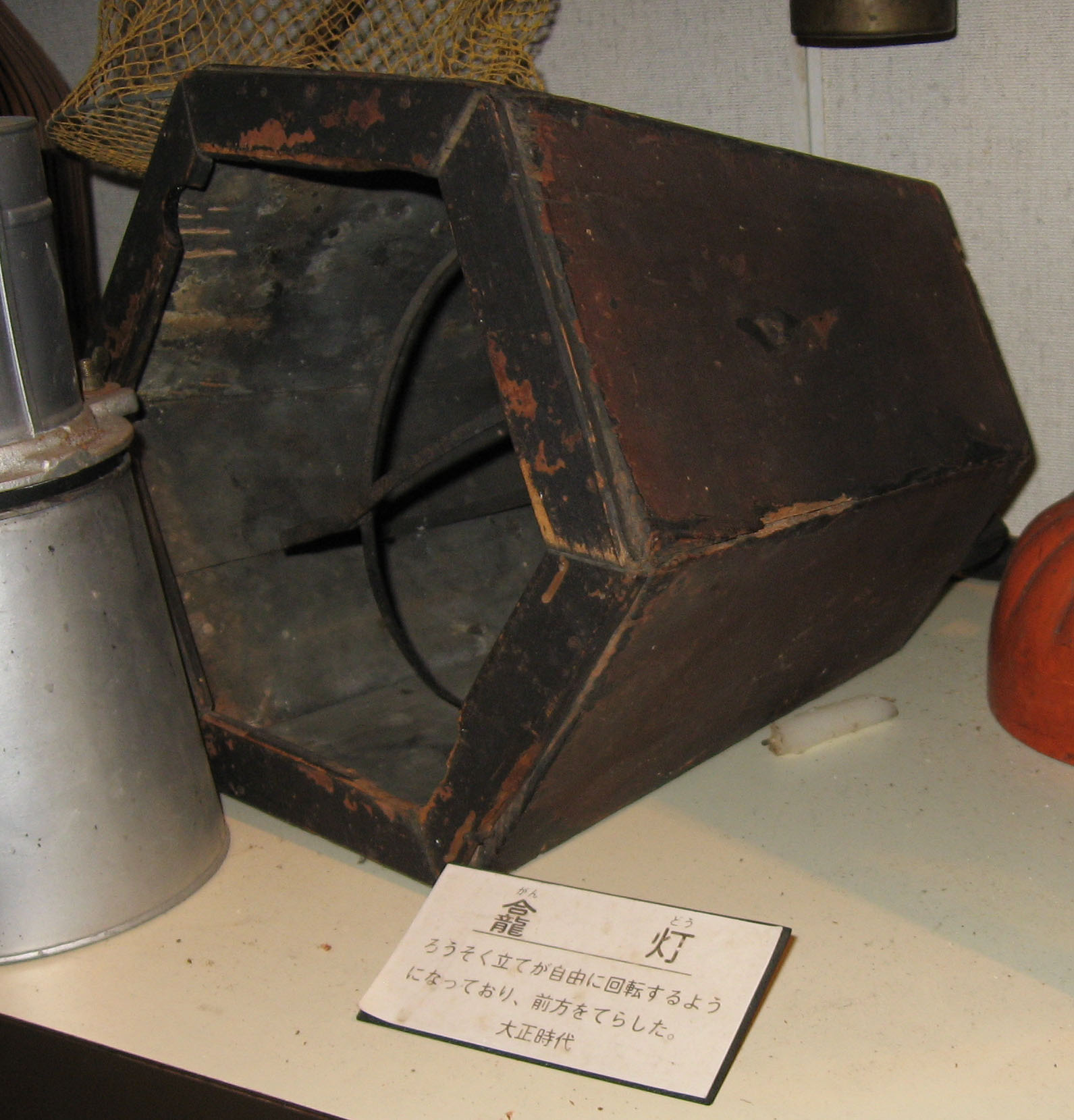
A hexagonal gandō dating from c. 1912–1926

A gandō (龕燈; lit. 'niche lantern') was a type of Japanese gyroscopic lantern invented in the early 17th century. Using a unique method of directional light projection, it was comparable in use to a modern flashlight. This type of lantern is also known as a shagandō (遮眼燈; transl. 'occlusion lantern'). Gandō-style lanterns are described in the Bansenshūkai of 1676.

== Summary ==
The external shroud was bell-shaped and could be made of copper, tinplate, or later galvanized steel. A handle was mounted at the rear of the shroud. Inside, two steel rings in free rotation formed a dual-axis gimbal, and a candle was fixed at the center on a self-stabilizing pan to catch melting wax. Behind this assembly was a parabolic mirror. This ensured that the candle always stood vertically and thereby could remain lit no matter what angle the lantern was pointed.

Because light was only projected forward, the user could illuminate an object without revealing their own face. Gandō are said to have been popular with burglars and watchmen alike in medieval times.

During the Second World War, gandō were distributed to civil defense organizations like the tonarigumi. This type of lantern appears to have remained in use until around 1945. Today, gandō are sometimes sensationalized as "shinobi lanterns" (忍び提燈).

== Gallery ==
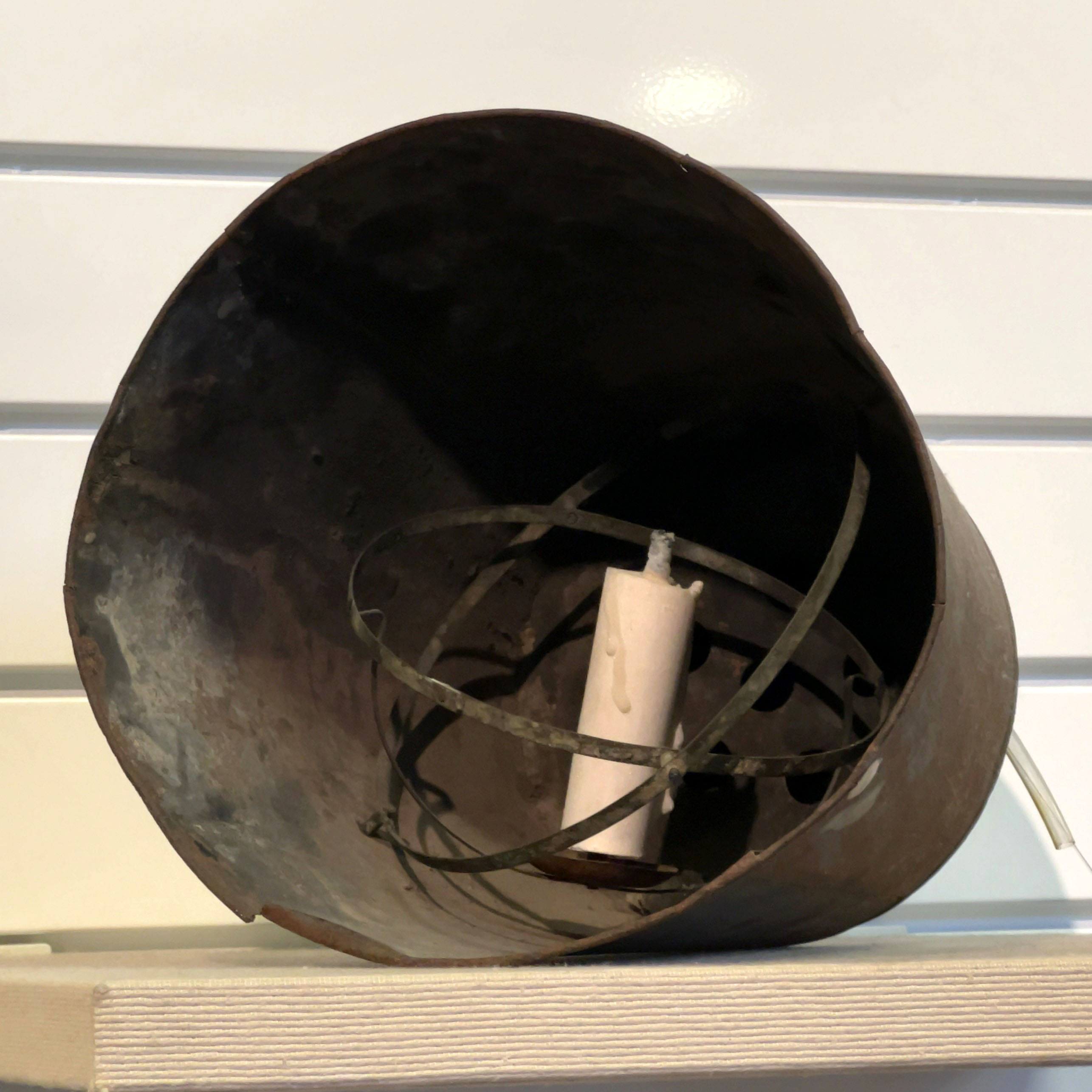
A circular gandō, front view.

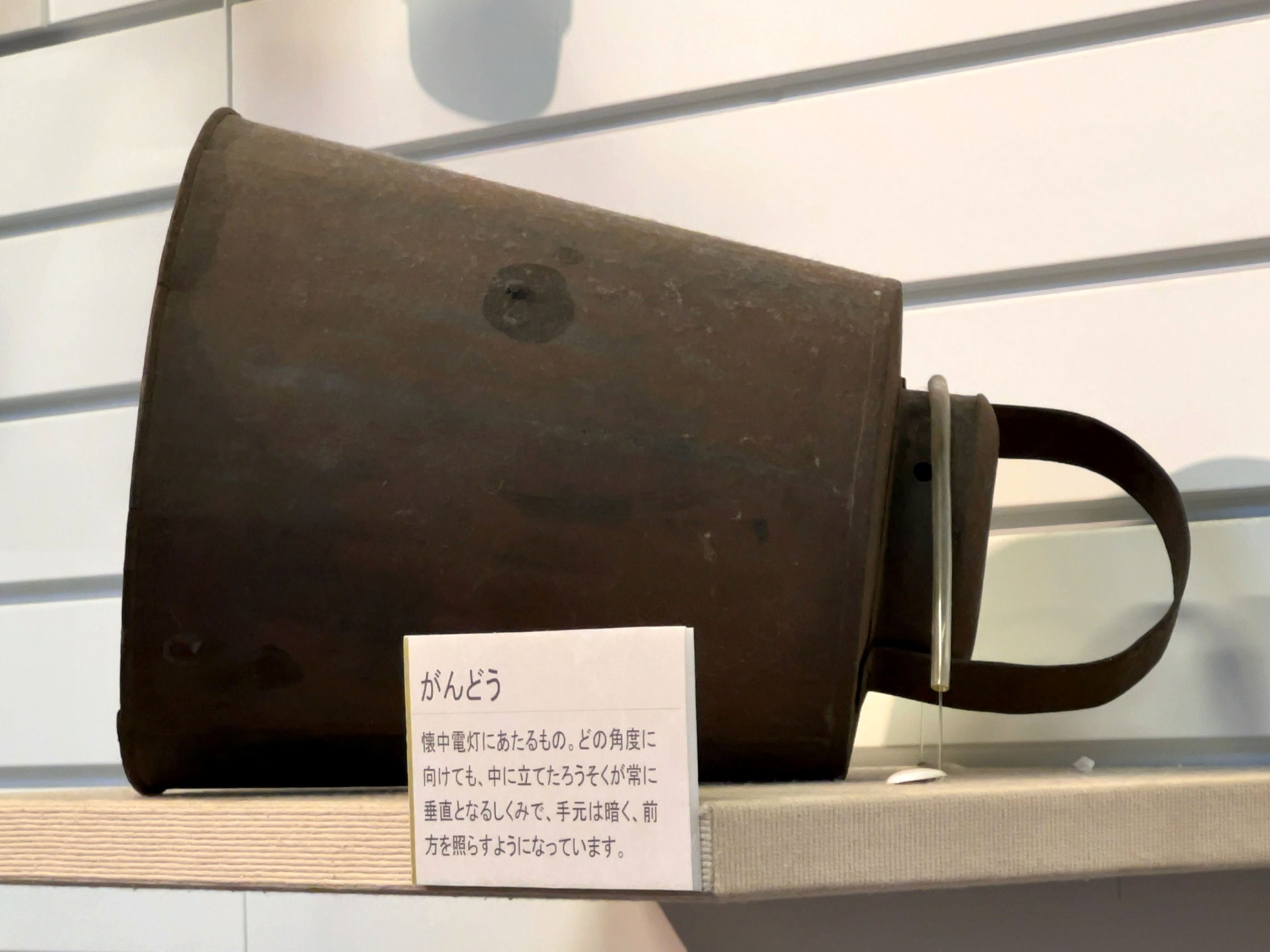
Ibid., side view.

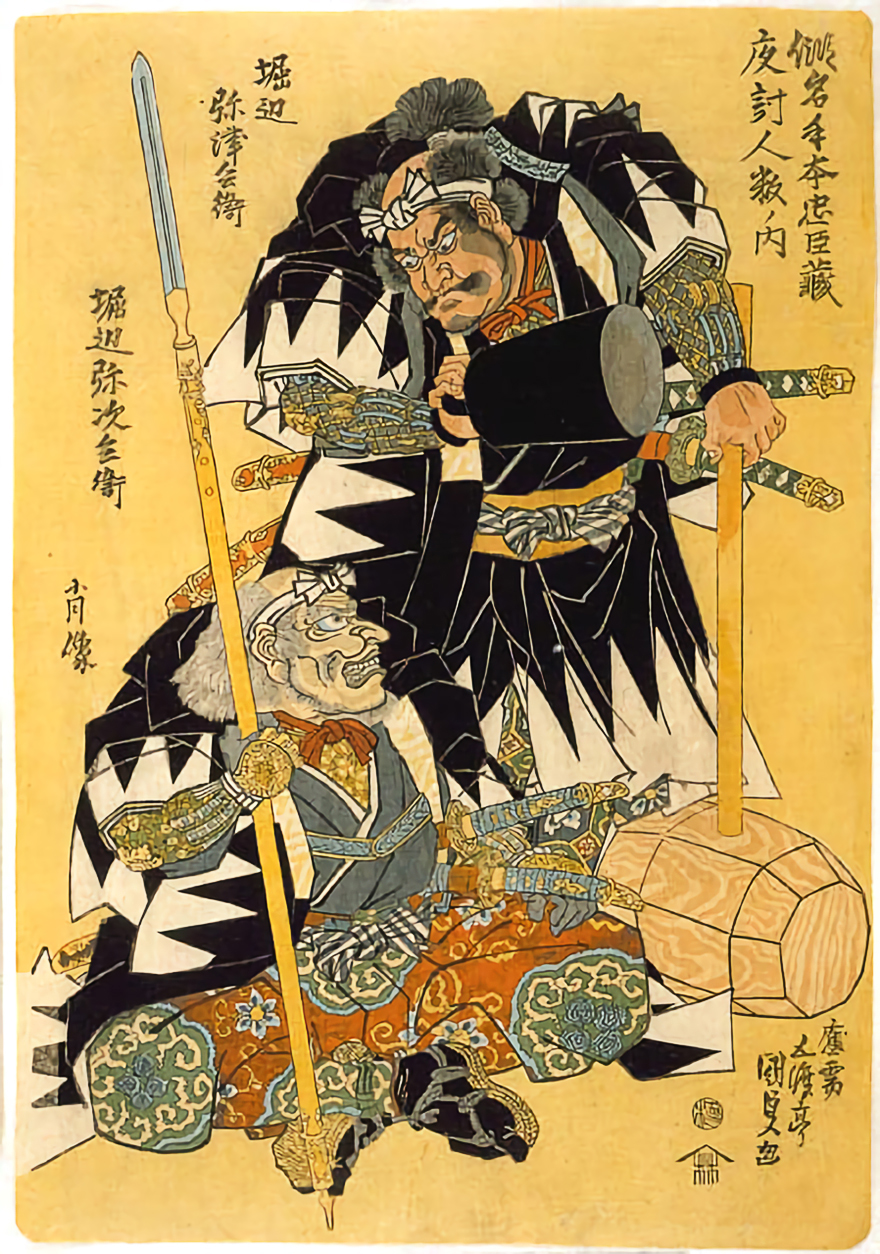
Horibe Yasubee (standing) holds a circular gandō in one hand in a depiction from the early 19th century
