= Thirty-Six Immortals of Poetry =

Group of Japanese poets

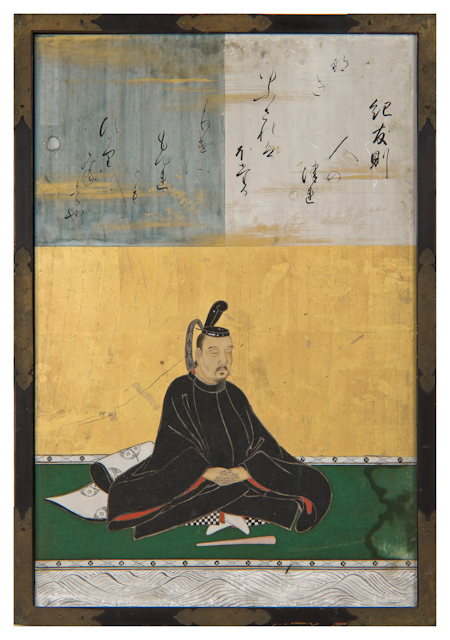
Ki no Tomonori by Kanō Tan'yū, 1648

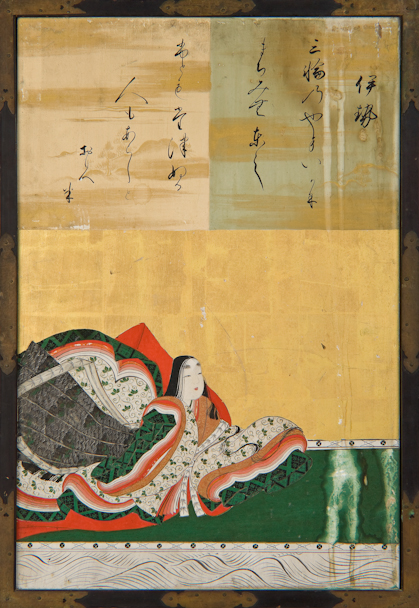
Lady Ise painting by Kanō Tan'yū, 1648

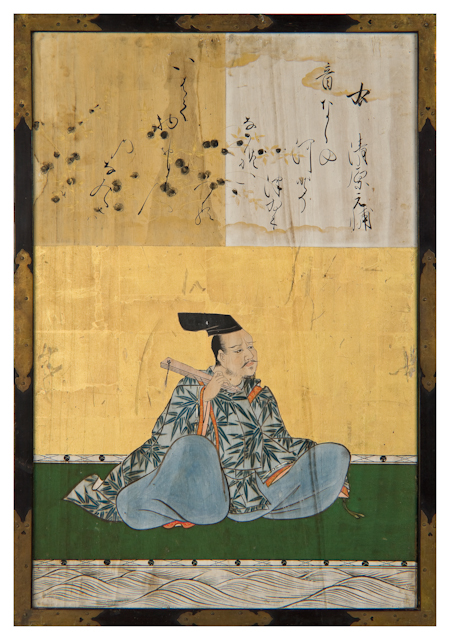
Kiyohara no Motosuke by Kanō Yasunobu, 1648

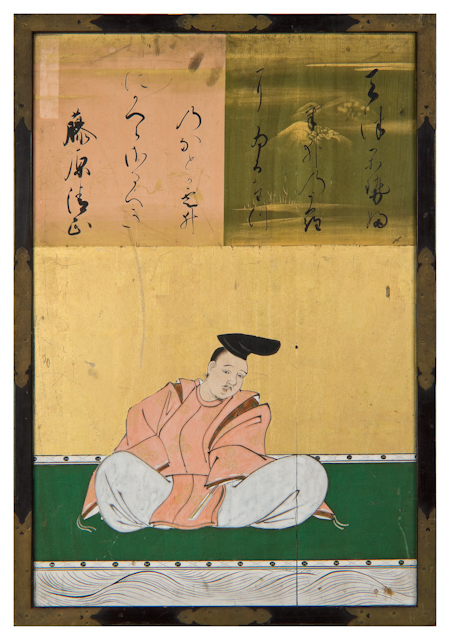
Fujiwara no Kiyotada by Kanō Naonobu, 1648

The Thirty-Six Immortals of Poetry (三十六歌仙, Sanjūrokkasen) are a group of Japanese poets of the Asuka, Nara, and Heian periods selected by Fujiwara no Kintō as exemplars of Japanese poetic ability. The oldest surviving collection of the 36 poets' works is Nishi Honganji Sanju-rokunin Kashu ("Nishi Honganji 36 poets collection") of 1113. Similar groups of Japanese poets include the Kamakura period Nyōbō Sanjūrokkasen (女房三十六歌仙), composed by court ladies exclusively, and the Chūko Sanjūrokkasen (中古三十六歌仙), or Thirty-Six Heian-era Immortals of Poetry, selected by Fujiwara no Norikane (1107–1165). This list superseded an older group called the Six Immortals of Poetry.

Sets of portraits (essentially imaginary) of the group were popular in Japanese painting and later woodblock prints, and often hung in temples.

== Kintō's Thirty-Six Immortals of Poetry ==
1. Kakinomoto no Hitomaro
2. Ki no Tsurayuki
3. Ōshikōchi Mitsune
4. Lady Ise
5. Ōtomo no Yakamochi
6. Yamabe no Akahito
7. Ariwara no Narihira
8. Henjō
9. Sosei
10. Ki no Tomonori
11. Sarumaru no Taifu
12. Ono no Komachi
13. Fujiwara no Kanesuke
14. Fujiwara no Asatada
15. Fujiwara no Atsutada
16. Fujiwara no Takamitsu
17. Minamoto no Kintada
18. Mibu no Tadamine
19. Saigū no Nyōgo
20. Ōnakatomi no Yorimoto
21. Fujiwara no Toshiyuki
22. Minamoto no Shigeyuki
23. Minamoto no Muneyuki
24. Minamoto no Saneakira
25. Fujiwara no Kiyotada
26. Minamoto no Shitagō
27. Fujiwara no Okikaze
28. Kiyohara no Motosuke
29. Sakanoue no Korenori
30. Fujiwara no Motozane
31. Ōnakatomi no Yoshinobu
32. Fujiwara no Nakafumi
33. Taira no Kanemori
34. Mibu no Tadami
35. Kodai no Kimi
36. Nakatsukasa

== Thirty-Six Female Immortals of Poetry ==
Main article↗︎

Nyōbō Sanjūrokkasen (女房三十六歌仙), composed in the Kamakura period, refers to thirty-six female immortals of poetry:

1. Ono no Komachi
2. Ise
3. Nakatsukasa
4. Kishi Joō
5. Ukon
6. Fujiwara no Michitsuna no Haha
7. Uma no Naishi
8. Akazome Emon
9. Izumi Shikibu
10. Kodai no Kimi
11. Murasaki Shikibu
12. Koshikibu no Naishi
13. Ise no Taifu
14. Sei Shōnagon
15. Daini no Sanmi
16. Takashina no Kishi
17. Yūshi Naishinnō-ke no Kii
18. Sagami
19. Shikishi Naishinnō
20. Kunai-kyō
21. Suō no Naishi
22. Fujiwara no Toshinari no Musume
23. Taikenmon'in no Horikawa
24. Gishūmon'in no Tango
25. Kayōmon'in no Echizen
26. Nijōin no Sanuki
27. Kojijū
28. Go-Toba-in no Shimotsuke
29. Ben no Naishi
30. Gofukakusa-in no shōshō no naishi
31. Inpumon'in no Tayū
32. Tsuchimikado'in no Kosaishō
33. Hachijō-in Takakura
34. Fujiwara no Chikako
35. Shikikenmon'in no Mikushige
36. Sōhekimon'in no Shōshō

== New Thirty-Six Immortals of Poetry ==
There are at least two groups of Japanese poets called New Thirty-Six Immortals of Poetry (新三十六歌仙, Shinsanjūrokkasen):

- One selected by Fujiwara no Mototoshi (Heian period, now lost)
- One including poets mainly of the Kamakura period; who selected this is unknown.

The term usually refers to the second, as this is still extant:

1. Emperor Go-Toba
2. Emperor Tsuchimikado
3. Emperor Juntoku
4. Emperor Go-Saga
5. Prince Masanari of Rokujō-no-Miya
6. Prince Munetaka of Kamakura-no-Miya
7. Prince Dōjonyūdō
8. Princess Shikishi
9. Kujō Yoshitsune
10. Kujō Michiie
11. Saionji Kintsune
12. Koga Michiteru
13. Saionji Saneuji
14. Minamoto no Sanetomo
15. Kujō Motoie
16. Fujiwara no Ieyoshi
17. Jien
18. Gyōi
19. Minamoto no Michitomo (Horikawa Michitomo)
20. Fujiwara no Sadaie
21. Hachijō-in Takakura
22. Shunzei's Daughter
23. Go-Toba-in Kunaikyō
24. Sōhekimon'in no Shōshō
25. Fujiwara no Tameie
26. Asukai Masatsune
27. Fujiwara no Ietaka
28. Fujiwara no Tomoie
29. Fujiwara no Ariie
30. Hamuro Mitsutoshi
31. Fujiwara no Nobuzane
32. Minamoto no Tomochika
33. Fujiwara no Takasuke
34. Minamoto no Ienaga
35. Kamo no Chōmei
36. Fujiwara no Hideyoshi

== Late Classical Thirty-Six Immortals of Poetry ==
1. Sei Shōnagon
2. Izumi Shikibu
3. Sagami
4. Egyō
5. Akazome Emon
6. Fujiwara no Michinobu
7. Nōin
8. Taira no Sadafumi
9. Kiyohara no Fukayabu
10. Uma no Naishi
11. Fujiwara no Yoshitaka
12. Ōe no Chisato
13. Fujiwara no Sadayori
14. Jōtōmon'in no Chūjō
15. Murasaki Shikibu
16. Fujiwara no Michitsuna no Haha
17. Fujiwara no Nagatō
18. Ariwara no Muneyana
19. Fujiwara no Michimasa
20. Prince Kanemi
21. Ise no Taifu
22. Sone no Yoshitada
23. Fun'ya no Yasuhide
24. Fujiwara no Tadafusa
25. Sugawara no Sukeaki
26. Ōe no Masahira
27. Anpō
28. Ōe no Yoshitoki
29. Minamoto no Michinari
30. Dōmyō
31. Zōki
32. Ariwara no Motokata
33. Fujiwara no Sanekata
34. Fujiwara no Kintō
35. Ōnakatomi no Sukechika
36. Fujiwara no Takatō

== See also ==
- Rokkasen
- Nishi Honganji Sanju-rokunin Kashu
