= List of Japanese women writers =

The following is a list of Japanese women writers and manga artists.

== A ==
- Hotaru Akane (born 1983), blogger, lyricist
- Akiko Akazome (1974–2017), novelist
- Akazome Emon (956–1041), waka poet
- Risu Akizuki (born 1958), manga writer
- Akira Amano (born 1973), manga writer
- Chihiro Amano (born 1982), screenwriter
- Kozue Amano (born 1974), manga writer
- Moyoco Anno (born 1971), manga writer, fashion writer
- Yasuko Aoike (born 1948), manga writer
- Kotomi Aoki (born 1980), manga writer
- Ume Aoki, manga writer
- Nanae Aoyama (born 1983), novelist
- Kiyoko Arai, manga writer
- Motoko Arai (born 1960), science fiction and fantasy writer
- Hiromu Arakawa (born 1973), manga writer
- Hiro Arikawa (born 1972), light novelist
- Sawako Ariyoshi (1931–1984), writer, novelist
- Mariko Asabuki (born 1984), novelist
- Yū Asagiri, manga writer
- Makate Asai (born 1959), novelist
- Maki Asakawa (1942–2010), lyricist
- George Asakura (born 1974), manga writer
- Hinako Ashihara, manga writer
- Izumi Aso (born 1960), manga writer

== B ==
- Mariko Bando

== C ==
- Toriko Chiya, manga writer
- Fukuda Chiyo-ni (1703–1775), poet

== D ==
- Tamaki Daido (born 1966), novelist, essayist

== E ==
- Eiki Eiki (born 1971), manga writer
- Fumiko Enchi (1905–1986)
- Maki Enjōji, manga writer
- Nariko Enomoto (born 1967), manga writer
- Makiko Esumi (born 1966), writer, essayist, lyricist

== F ==
- Mihona Fujii (born 1974), manga writer
- Kazuko Fujita (born 1957), manga writer
- Kaori Fujino (born 1980), novelist
- Cocoa Fujiwara (1983–2015), manga writer
- Hiro Fujiwara (born 1981), manga writer

== G ==
- Empress Genmei (660–721)

== H ==
- Moto Hagio (born 1949), manga writer
- Hani Motoko (1873–1957), journalist
- Hayashi Fumiko (1903–1951), novelist and poet
- Maha Harada (born 1962), novelist
- Nanae Haruno manga writer
- Hasegawa Shigure (1879–1941), playwright, editor
- Machiko Hasegawa (1920–1992), manga writer
- Sugako Hashida (1925–2021), scriptwriter
- Isoko Hatano (1905–1978), writer and developmental psychologist
- Bisco Hatori (born 1975), manga writer
- Miyuki Hatoyama (born 1943), actor, writer
- Mariko Hayashi (born 1954), novelist, essayist
- Q Hayashida (born 1977), manga writer and artist
- Akiko Higashimura (born 1975), manga writer
- Asa Higuchi (born 1970), manga writer
- Keiko Higuchi (born 1932), writer, journalist
- Higuchi Tachibana (born 1976), manga writer
- Aoi Hiiragi (born 1962), manga writer
- Kaoruko Himeno (born 1958), novelist, essayist
- Saeko Himuro (1957–2008), novelist, essayist
- Matsuri Hino manga writer
- Taiko Hirabayashi (1905–1972), writer
- Raichō Hiratsuka (1886–1971), writer, activist, feminist, founder of Bluestocking (magazine)
- Tatsuko Hoshino (1903–1984), haiku poet
- Chieko Hosokawa (born 1935), manga writer
- Yumi Hotta (born 1957), manga writer
- Ichiyo Higuchi (1872–1896), writer

== I ==
- Yumiko Igarashi (born 1950)
- Koi Ikeno (born 1959)
- Gō Ikeyamada
- Ryo Ikuemi (born 1964)
- Natsuko Imamura (born 1980), novelist
- Etsu Inagaki Sugimoto (1873–1950)
- Lady Ise (c. 875–c. 938)
- Ise no Taifu (989–1060)
- Yuka Ishii (born 1963), novelist
- Michiko Ishimure (1927–2018)
- Noe Itō (1895–1923)
- Risa Itō (born 1969)
- Natsumi Itsuki (born 1960)
- Mariko Iwadate (born 1957)
- Kaneyoshi Izumi
- Izumi Shikibu (976–1033)

== K ==
- Mitsuyo Kakuta (born 1967)
- Yoko Kamio (born 1966)
- Hitomi Kanehara (born 1983), novelist
- Aya Kanno (born 1980)
- Junko Karube
- Lady Kasa
- Maki Kashimada (born 1976), novelist
- Kazuyo Katsuma (born 1968)
- Kazune Kawahara (born 1972)
- Yumiko Kawahara (born 1960)
- Hiromi Kawakami
- Kikuko Kawakami (1904–1985)
- Mieko Kawakami (born 1977), novelist, essayist, poet
- Mizuki Kawashita (born 1971)
- Kazumi Kazui
- Yuko Takada Keller (born 1958)
- Toshie Kihara (born 1948)
- Yuki Kiriga (born 1976)
- Natsuo Kirino (born 1951)
- Kishi Joō
- Rio Kishida (1946–2003)
- Yao Kitabatake (1903–1982)
- Kitada Usurai (1876–1900)
- Nobori Kiuchi (born 1967), novelist
- Eriko Kishida (1929–2011)
- Miyuki Kobayashi (born 1964)
- Kodai no Kimi
- Yun Kōga (born 1965)
- Marie Kondo (born 1984)
- Fumiyo Kōno (born 1968)
- Natsuki Koyata (born 1981), novelist
- Natsuko Kuroda (born 1937), novelist
- Tetsuko Kuroyanagi (born 1933)

== M ==
- Sonoko Machida (born 1980), novelist
- Miyake Kaho (1868–1943)
- Miyako Maki (born 1935)
- Sanami Matoh (born 1969)
- Aoko Matsuda (born 1979), writer, translator
- Nina Matsumoto (born 1984)
- Temari Matsumoto
- Akemi Matsunae (born 1956)
- Asa Matsuoka (1893–1980)
- Kyoko Matsuoka (1935–2022), children's author and translator
- Akimoto Matsuyo (1911–2001)
- Michitsuna no Haha (c. 936–995)
- Mitsukazu Mihara (born 1970), manga writer
- Kanan Minami (born 1979)
- Kazuka Minami
- Kazuya Minekura (born 1975)
- Suzue Miuchi (born 1951)
- Ayako Miura (1922–1999)
- Shion Miura (born 1976), novelist, essayist
- Yuriko Miyamoto (1899–1951)
- Hideko Mizuno (born 1939)
- Junko Mizuno (born 1973)
- Setona Mizushiro (born 1971)
- Milk Morinaga
- Akiko Morishima (born 1973)
- Tama Morita (1894–1970)
- Yoko Moriwaki (1932–1945)
- Yoshiko Miya (1945–2015), journalist
- Yukiko Motoya (born 1979), novelist, playwright
- Murasaki Shikibu 973–1014)
- Kiyoko Murata (born 1945), novelist
- Sayaka Murata (born 1979), novelist
- Yuka Murayama
- Mayumi Muroyama

== N ==
- Ai Nagai (born 1951), playwright
- Rieko Nakagawa (1935–2024), children's writer, poet
- Aya Nakahara (born 1973)
- Kyoko Nakajima (born 1964), novelist, essayist
- Hisaya Nakajo (1973–2023)
- Hikaru Nakamura (born 1984)
- Yoshiki Nakamura (born 1969)
- Midori Nakano (born 1946)
- Nakatsukasa (912–991)
- Kei Nakazawa (born 1959), novelist, essayist, professor
- Kiriko Nananan (1972–2024)
- Lady Nijō (1258–1306)
- Kanako Nishi (born 1977), writer, novelist
- Keiko Nishi (born 1966)
- Yoshiko Nishitani
- Princess Nukata (630–690)

== O ==
- Anna Ogino (born 1956)
- Noriko Ogiwara (born 1959)
- Mariko Ōhara (born 1959)
- Nanase Ohkawa (born 1967)
- Mari Okada (born 1976)
- Reiko Okano (born 1960)
- Kyoko Okazaki (born 1963)
- Riku Onda (born 1964), novelist
- Fuyumi Ono (born 1960)
- Hiromu Ono (born 1953)
- Natsume Ono (born 1977)
- Masumi Oshima (born 1962), novelist
- Yumiko Ōshima (born 1947)
- Yōko Ōta (1906–1963)
- Shinobu Ohtaka (born 1983)
- Ōtomo no Sakanoe no Iratsume
- Hiroko Oyamada (born 1983), novelist
- Mari Ozawa

== R ==
- Marimo Ragawa
- Rieko Saibara (born 1964)
- Rikei (1530–1611)

== S ==
- Megumu Sagisawa (1968–2004)
- Fumi Saimon (born 1957)
- Mayu Sakai (born 1982)
- Io Sakisaka (born 1975)
- Momoko Sakura (1965–2018)
- Shino Sakuragi (born 1965), novelist, short story writer
- Kanoko Sakurakoji
- Erica Sakurazawa (born 1963)
- Tomoko Sasaki (born 1955)
- Hisae Sawachi (born 1930)
- Sei Shōnagon (966–1025)
- Yoshiko Sembon (born 1928)
- Tomoka Shibasaki (born 1973), novelist
- Yoshiko Shigekane (1927–1993), novelist
- Karuho Shiina (born 1975)
- Michiru Shimada (1959–2017)
- Rio Shimamoto (born 1983), novelist
- Aki Shimazaki
- Reiko Shimizu (born 1963)
- Takako Shimura (born 1973)
- Mayu Shinjo (born 1973)
- Hotate Shinkawa (born 1991), novelist
- Setsuko Shinoda (born 1955), novelist
- Chie Shinohara
- Kazuko Shiraishi (1931–2024)
- Shunzei's Daughter
- Fuyumi Soryo (born 1959), manga writer
- Keiko Suenobu (born 1979)
- Yuki Suetsugu (born 1975)
- Suzumi Suzuki (born 1983), essayist and novelist
- Hiromi Suzuki (dates unknown), artist, poet, and fiction writer
- Takasue's Daughter

== T ==
- Haruko Tachiiri (born 1949)
- Chimako Tada (1930–2003)
- Kaoru Tada (1960–1999)
- Tadano Makuzu (1763–1825)
- Nobuko Takagi (born 1946)
- Rumiko Takahashi (born 1957)
- Takako Takahashi (1932–2013)
- Kaoru Takamura (born 1953), novelist, essayist
- Hinako Takanaga (born 1972)
- Mitsuba Takanashi (born 1975)
- Fumio Takano, novelist
- Haneko Takayama (born 1975), novelist
- Kazumi Takayama (born 1994), novelist, self-help author
- Keiko Takemiya (born 1950)
- Hiroko Takenishi (born 1929)
- Kei Takeoka (born 1969), motoring journalist
- Yumi Tamura
- Yellow Tanabe
- Meca Tanaka (born 1976), manga writer
- Mitsu Tanaka (1943–2024)
- Arina Tanemura (born 1978)
- Yoko Tawada (born 1960), novelist, essayist, poet
- Keiko Tobe (1957–2010)
- Yana Toboso (born 1984)
- Hari Tokeino (born 1979)
- Ema Tōyama (born 1981)
- Masami Tsuda (born 1970)
- Mikiyo Tsuda
- Mizuki Tsujimura (born 1980)
- Kikuko Tsumura (born 1978), novelist
- Yūko Tsushima (1947–2016), novelist, essayist

== U ==
- Miwa Ueda
- Toshiko Ueda (1917–2008)
- Kimiko Uehara (born 1946)
- Nahoko Uehashi (born 1962)
- Chica Umino (born 1966)
- Yuki Urushibara (born 1974)

== W ==
- Natsuto Wada (1920–1983), scriptwriter, columnist
- Chisako Wakatake (born 1954), novelist
- Masako Watanabe (born 1929)
- Taeko Watanabe (born 1960)
- Yuu Watase (born 1970)
- Risa Wataya (born 1984), novelist

== Y ==
- Nanpei Yamada (born 1972)
- Ryoko Yamagishi (born 1947)
- Yūki Yamato (born 1989), screenwriter
- Yamakawa Kikue (1890–1980)
- Mika Yamamoto (1967–2012)
- Kazumi Yamashita (born 1959)
- Mari Yamazaki (born 1967)
- Rie Yasumi (born 1972)
- Ai Yazawa (born 1967)
- Year 24 Group
- Mari Yonehara (1950–2006)
- Akiko Yosano (1878–1942)
- Akimi Yoshida (born 1956)
- Tomoko Yoshida (born 1934)
- Banana Yoshimoto (born 1964)
- Nobuko Yoshiya (1896–1973)
- Wataru Yoshizumi (born 1963)
- Yuasa Yoshiko (1896–1990)
- Kaori Yuki
- Shigeko Yuki (1902–1969)
- Sumomo Yumeka (born 1977)
- Kazumi Yumoto (born 1959)
- Asako Yuzuki (born 1981), novelist

== See also ==
- List of Japanese writers
- List of women writers
- List of Japanese-language poets
