= Kunai-kyō =

Japanese poet

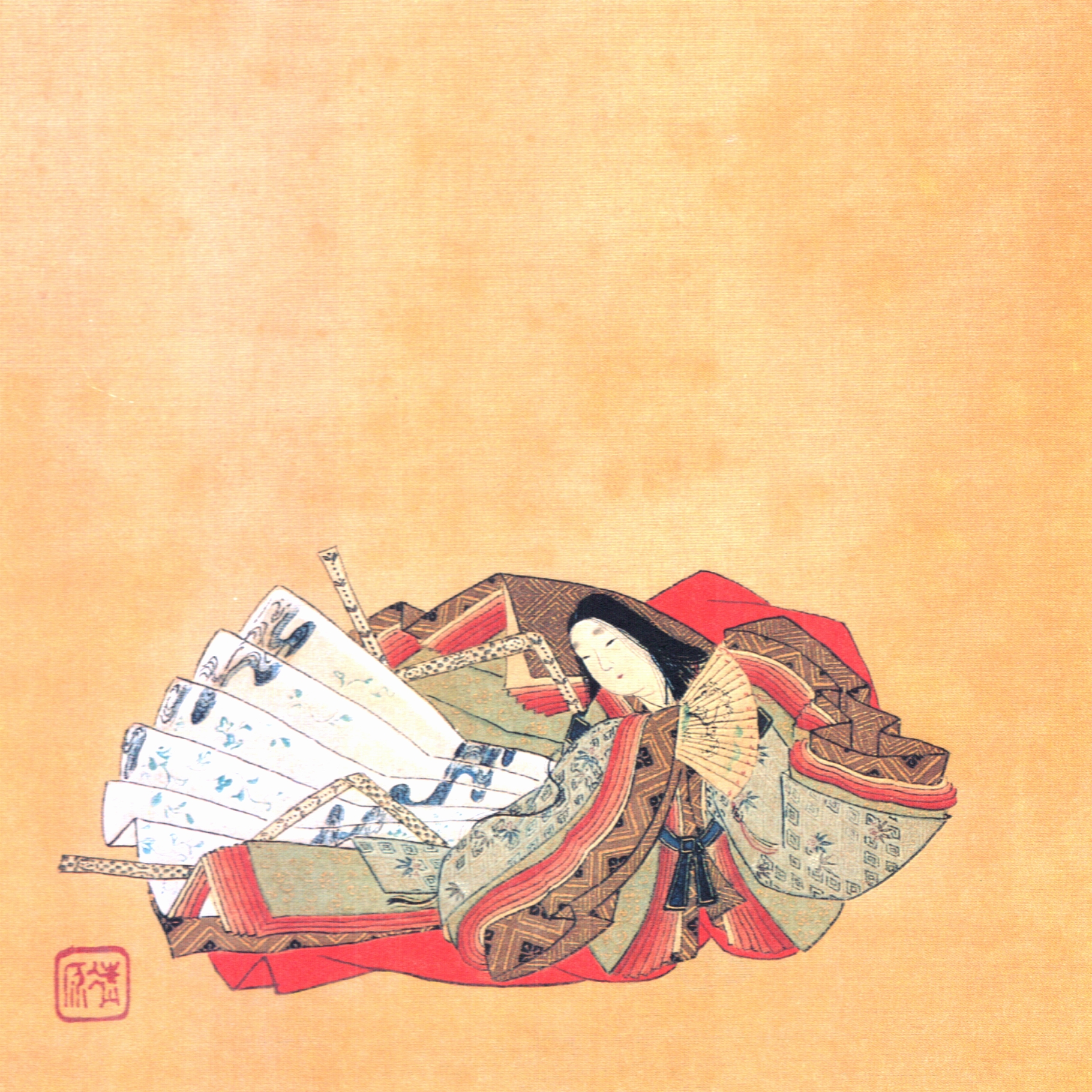
17th-century depiction of Kunai

Kunai-kyō (宮内卿; 1185 - 1204?) was a 13th-century Japanese poet, painter, and lady-in-waiting to Emperor Go-Toba. A prominent poet during the Kamakura period, she is considered one of the Thirty-Six Female Immortals of Poetry. Along with Princess Shikishi and Shunzei's daughter, she is recognized as one of the greatest women poets of the 13th century. Her career as a poet-prodigy lasted from approximately 1200 to 1204; she is thought to have died in 1204 or 1205.

Among other uta-awase, she competed in the Poetry Match in 1500 Rounds convened by Go-Toba in the palace in 1201, where 30 poets were commissioned to write hundred-poem sequences. As a fourteen or fifteen year old, Kunaikyō, alongside Shunzei's daughter and Fujiwara no Teika (who also served as one of the ten judges), competed in this event which was second in Go-Toba's literary events only next to the Shin Kokin Wakashū, compiled in the same year.

She was the daughter of Minamoto no Moromitsu and his wife (personal name Aki), the daughter of the painter Kose Munemochi, and the sister of Minamoto no Tomochika, who was himself recognized as one of the New Thirty-Six Immortals of Poetry. Her father was a descendant of Emperor Murakami through Minister of the Left Toshifusa. Her mother had been a lady-in-waiting to retired Emperor Go-Shirakawa and was a famous koto player.

Kunaikyō was recognized as an extraordinarily diligent and hard-working poet; in the Mumyōshō by the later poem Kamo no Chōmei, Kunaikyō surrounded herself with books and scrolls from beginning to end and worked on her poems day and night until her father warned her that it would be deleterious to her health. It was believed that her death was a result of her great exertion and she was greatly admired and lamented by the poet Jakuren. The Sasamegoto, a poetic treatise by the 15th century poet Shinkei, stated that her poetic labours were so exhausting that she spat blood. Unlike Shunzei's daughter who lived to be in her 80s, Kunaikyō was said to have been less than 20 years old when she died.

== Poetry ==
One poems she wrote for the hundred-poem sequence was recorded in the Masukagami.

usuku koki
nobe no midori no
wakakusa ni
ato made miyuru
yuki no muragie

Translation:

Pale here, deeper there–
the green of the young grasses
on the wild meadow
where can be seen the traces
of the snow's uneven melt
