= Egyō =

Japanese waka poet of the mid-Heian period

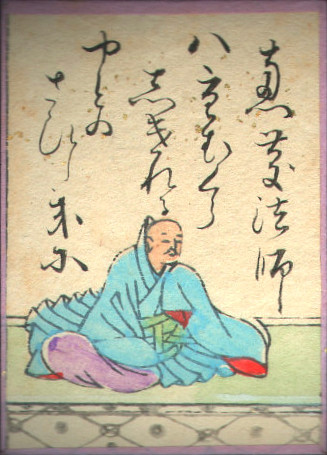
Egyō, from the Ogura Hyakunin Isshu.

Egyō (恵慶; sometimes read Ekei; dates unknown, but probably second half of the tenth century) was a Japanese waka poet of the mid-Heian period. One of his poems was included in the Ogura Hyakunin Isshu. He produced a private collection, the Egyō-hōshi-shū, and was listed as one of the Late Classical Thirty-Six Immortals of Poetry.

== Biography ==
Although his exact birth and death dates are unknown, he flourished in the Kanna era in the mid-980s, His name is sometimes read as Ekei.

== Poetry ==
Fifty-six of his poems were included in imperial anthologies from the Shūi Wakashū on, and he was included in the Late Classical Thirty-Six Immortals of Poetry.

Along with Anpō (安法), he was a central figure of the Kawara-no-in (河原院) poetry circle of his day, and also associated with the poets Ōnakatomi no Yoshinobu, Ki no Tokifumi and Taira no Kanemori.

The following poem by him was included as No. 47 in Fujiwara no Teika's Ogura Hyakunin Isshu:

Japanese text	Romanized Japanese	English translation
八重葎 しげれる宿の さびしきに 人こそ見えぬ 秋は来にけり	Yae mugura shigereru yado no sabishiki ni hito koso miene aki wa kinikeri	How lonely this house overgrown with goosegrass weeds. No one visits me— only the weary autumn comes.

He also left a private collection, the Egyō-hōshi-shū (恵慶法師集).

== Religion ==
He is supposed to have delivered sermons on the Buddhist sutras at the Kokubun-ji in Harima Province.

== Bibliography ==
- Keene, Donald (1999). A History of Japanese Literature, Vol. 1: Seeds in the Heart — Japanese Literature from Earliest Times to the Late Sixteenth Century. New York: Columbia University Press. ISBN 978-0-231-11441-7.
- McMillan, Peter. 2010 (1st ed. 2008). One Hundred Poets, One Poem Each. New York: Columbia University Press.
- Suzuki Hideo, Yamaguchi Shin'ichi, Yoda Yasushi. 2009 (1st ed. 1997). Genshoku: Ogura Hyakunin Isshu. Tokyo: Bun'eidō.
