= Sanju Rokunin Kashu =

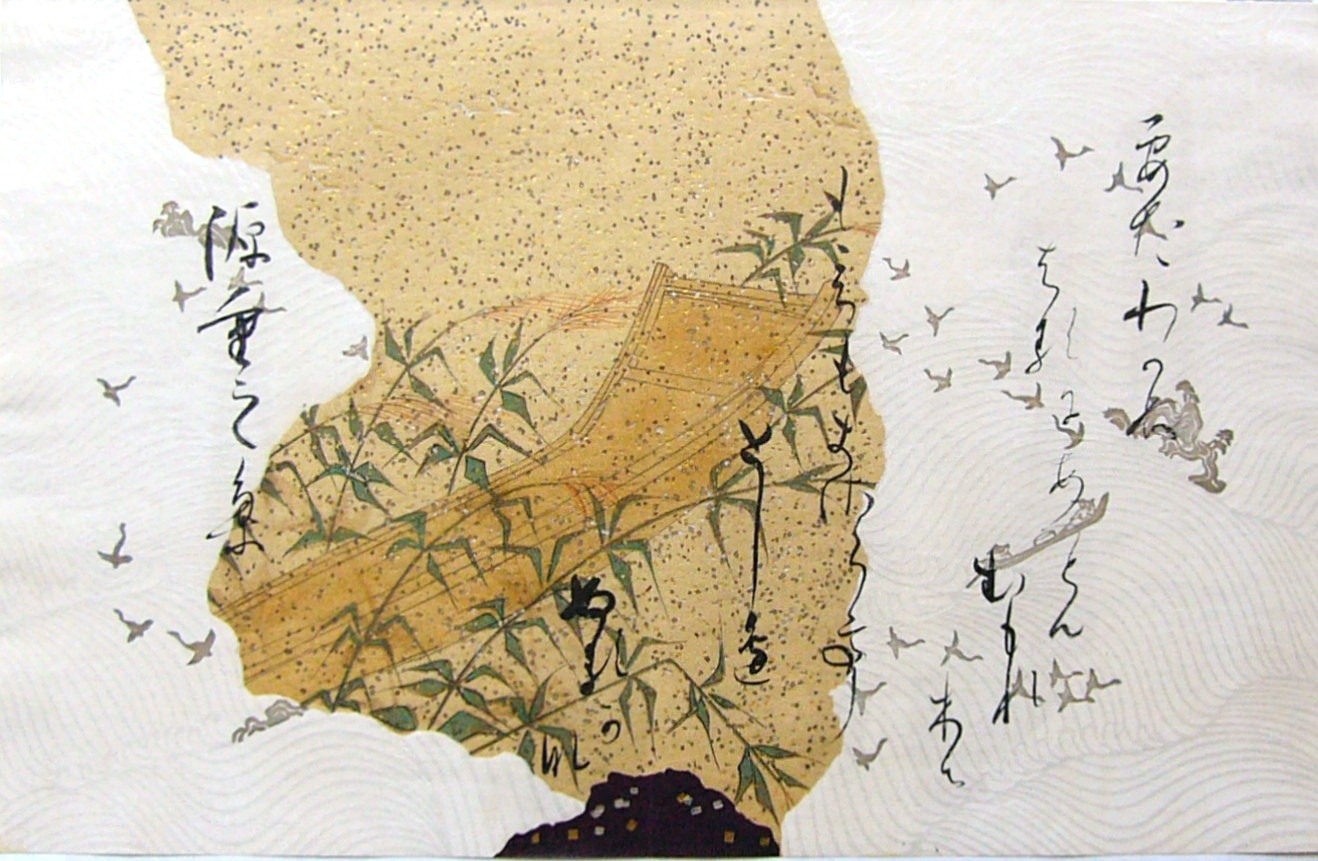
Minamoto no Shigeyuki volume

Sanju-rokunin Kashu (Collection of Thirty-six Anthologies) is a set of illuminated manuscript codex from the early 12th century containing a collection of waka poems by thirty-six master poets (Thirty-Six Immortals of Poetry). They were originally selected for an 11th-century anthology known as the Sanju-rokuninsen (三十六人撰) by Fujiwara no Kintō. In the 12th century, the poems were transcribed as a compilation for the birthday of Emperor Toba (r. 1107–1123) consisting of 39 volumes and involving 20 calligraphers. It is the oldest surviving manuscript that contains the collection of the 36 poets and is designated as a National Treasure, and is believed to be the oldest known example of paper marbling. It also contains chigiri-e, a type of paper collage. In the 16th century, the works were dedicated to Nishi Honganji which was located in Ishiyama in the Osaka Prefecture. The temple was later moved to Kyoto and divided, and at this point the works became part of the formal Nishi Hongan-ji National Treasures, where they are still stored.

The set contains thirty-nine volumes of which thirty-two are original in ACE1109-1112. One (collected poems of Fujiwara no Kanesuke) was altered to another late Heian period manuscript. Four volumes are from the mid-17th century (Edo period). Two volumes are replicas by Tanaka Shinbi (1875–1975) produced c. 1920s. The original two volumes were separated and sold to collectors as single leaves in 1929. The manuscripts are Detchōsō bound (glued books). 20 cm x 16 cm and the paper ornamented with silver, gold, colour, mica, and ink.

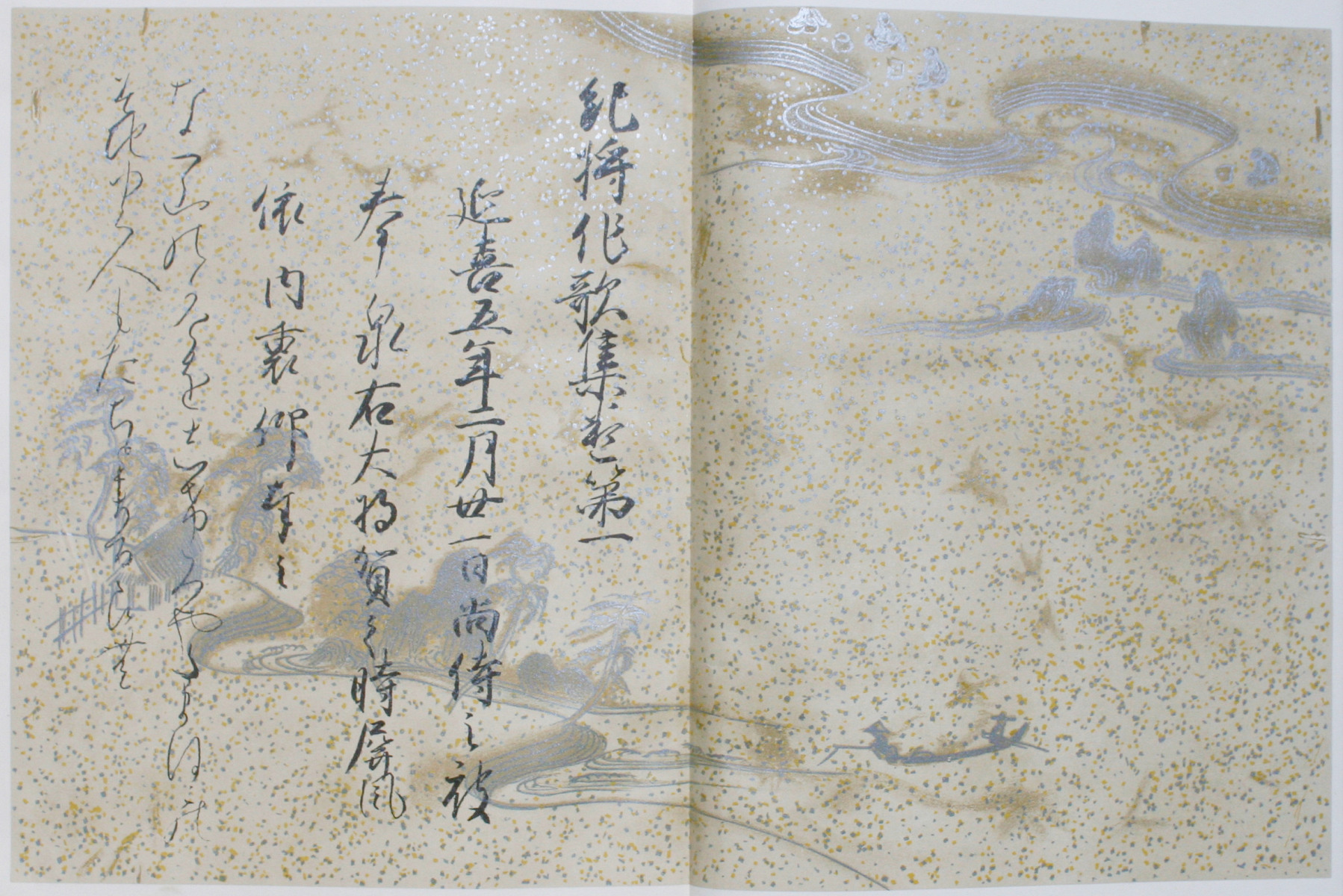
Ki no Tsurayuki 1st volume Fujiwara no Sadazane

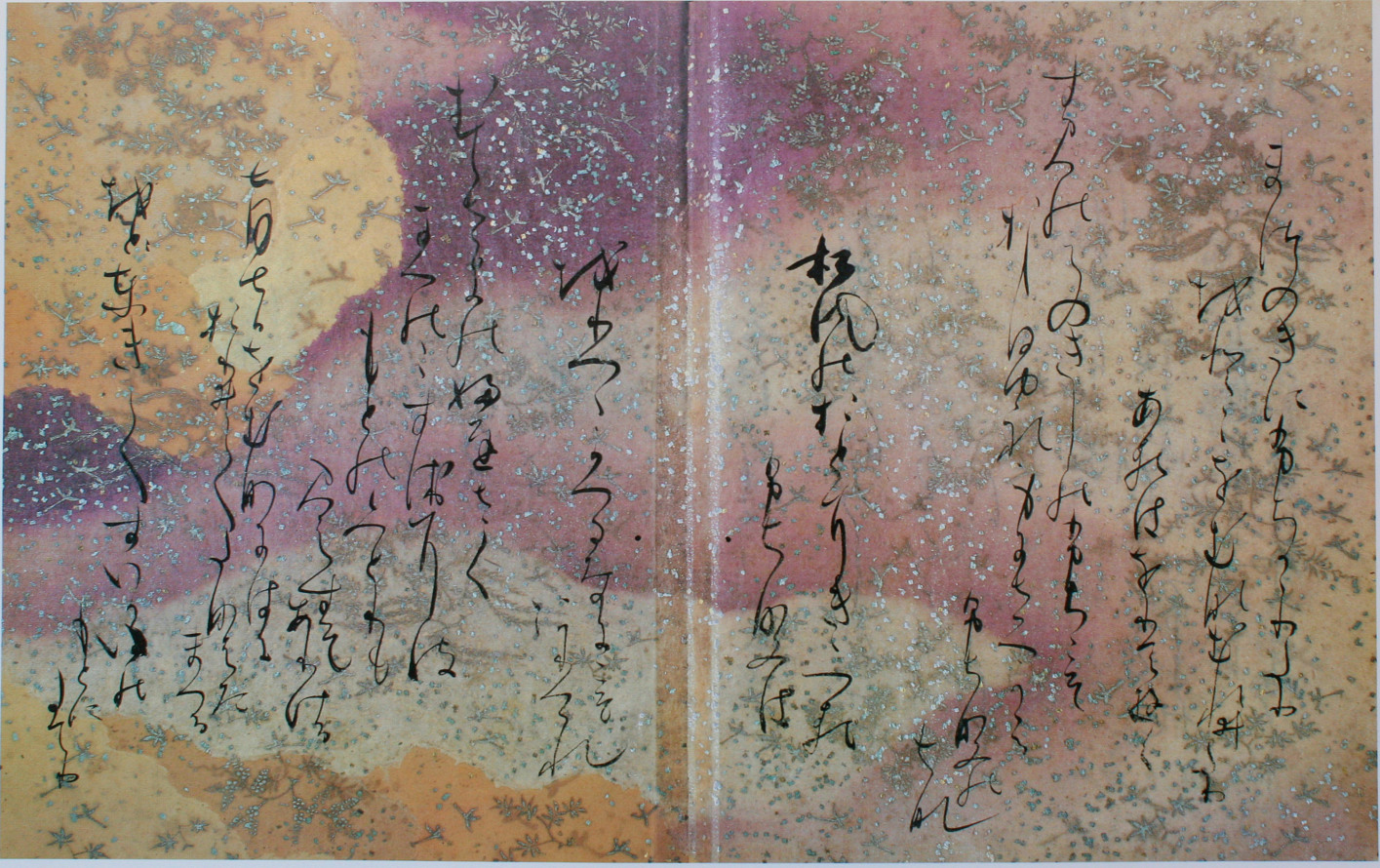
Minamoto no Shitagō volume

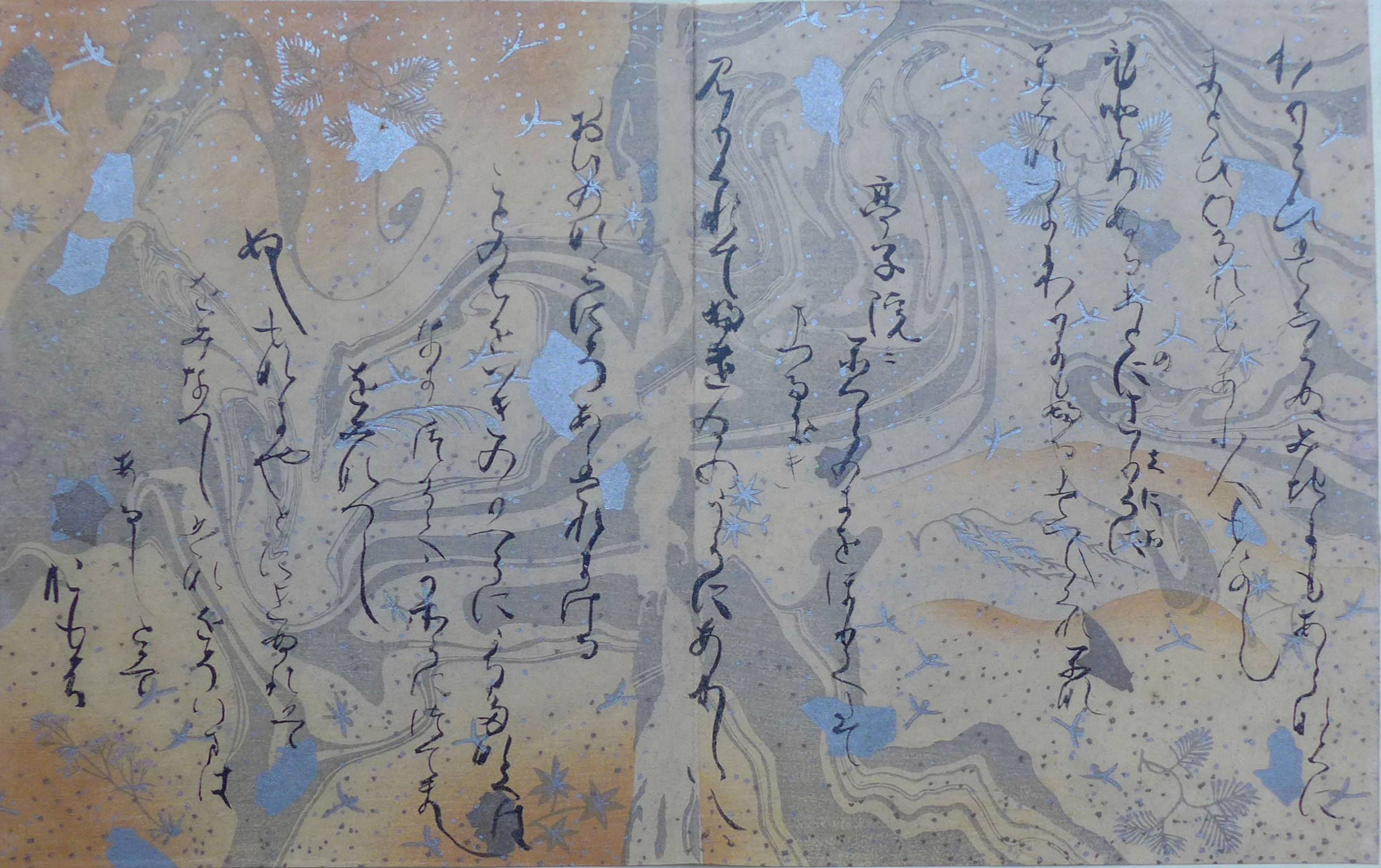
Ōshikōchi Mitsune volume

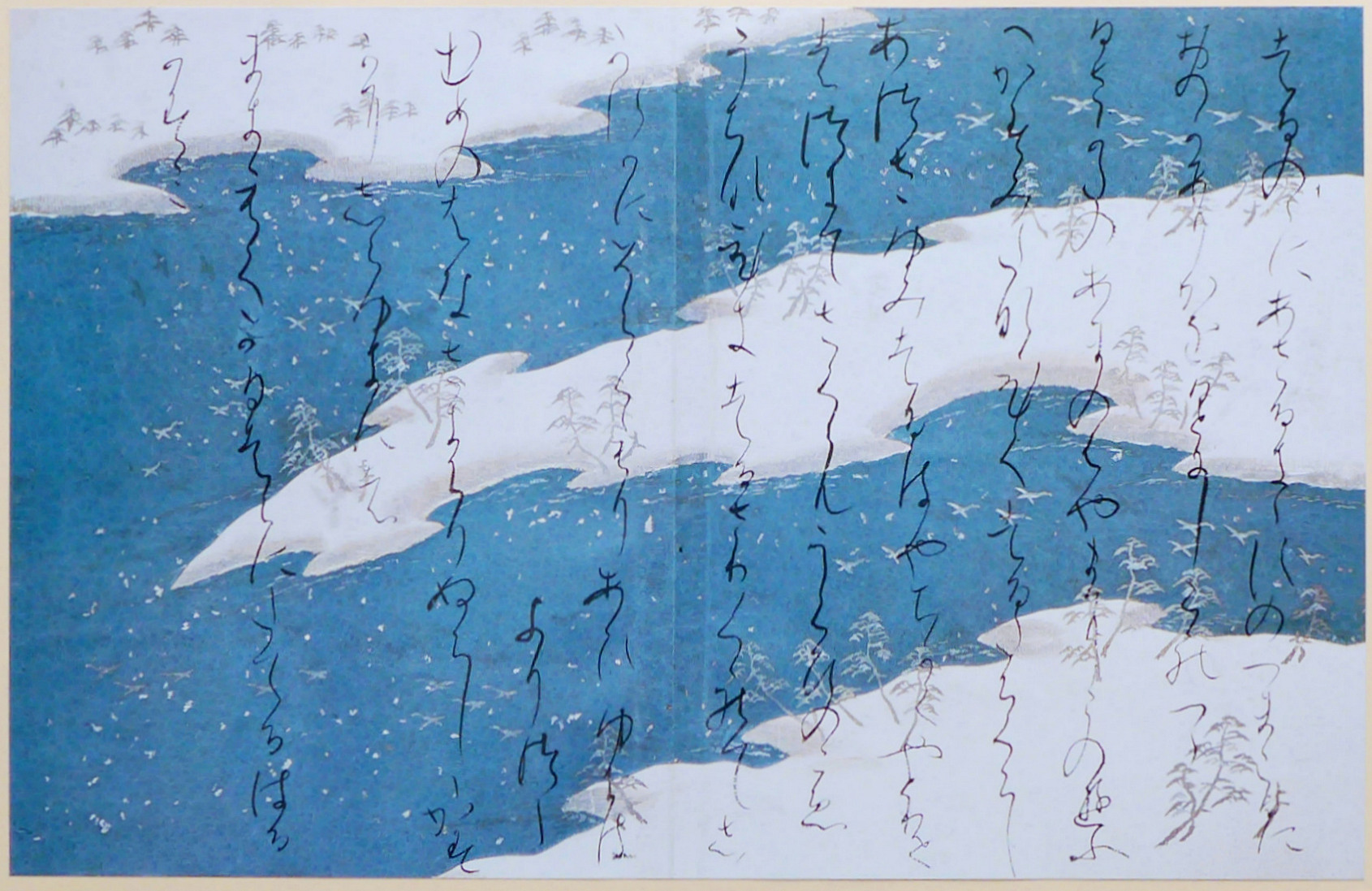
Yamabe no Akahito volume

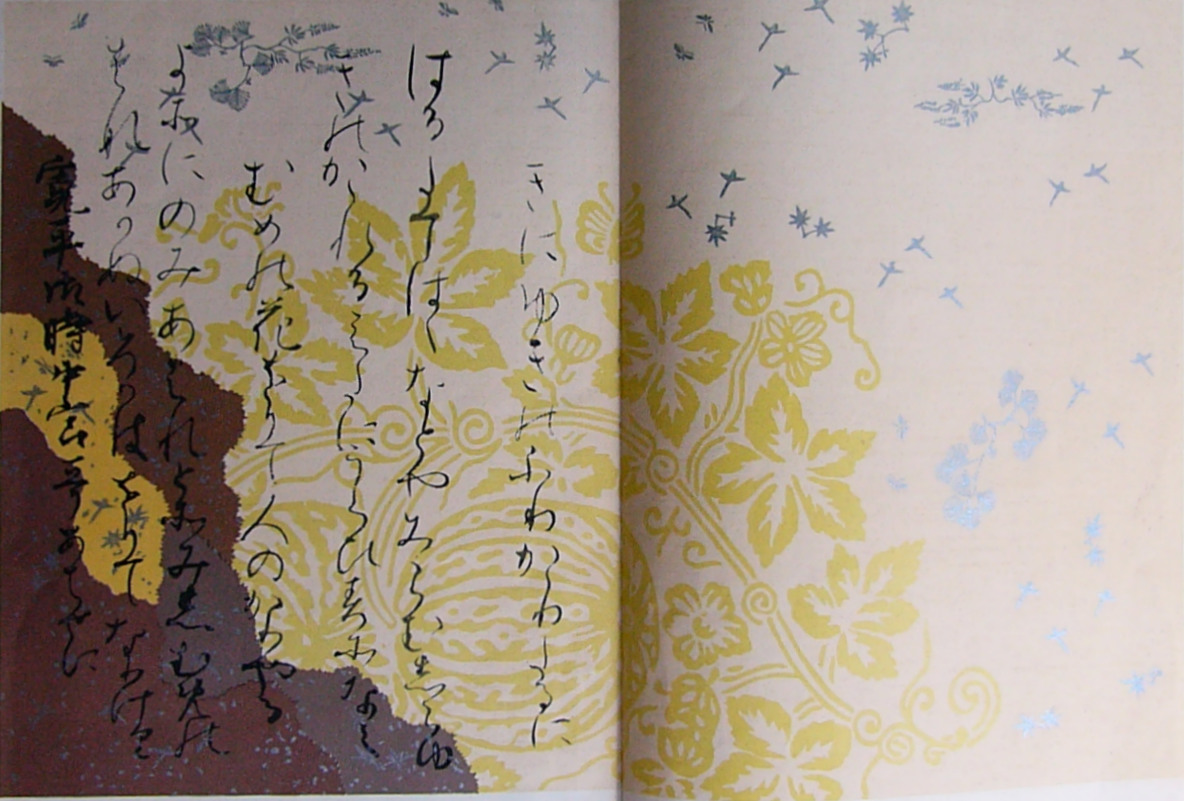
Sosei volume

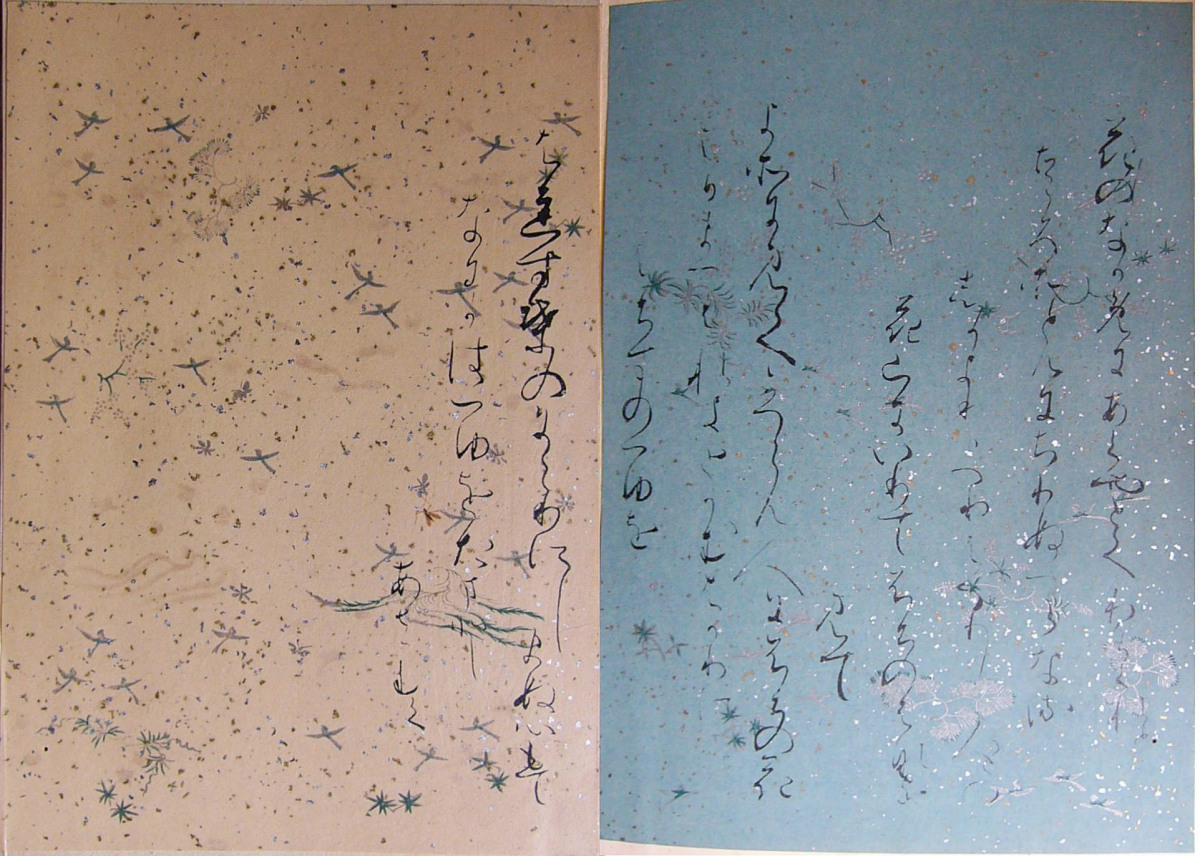
Henjō volume

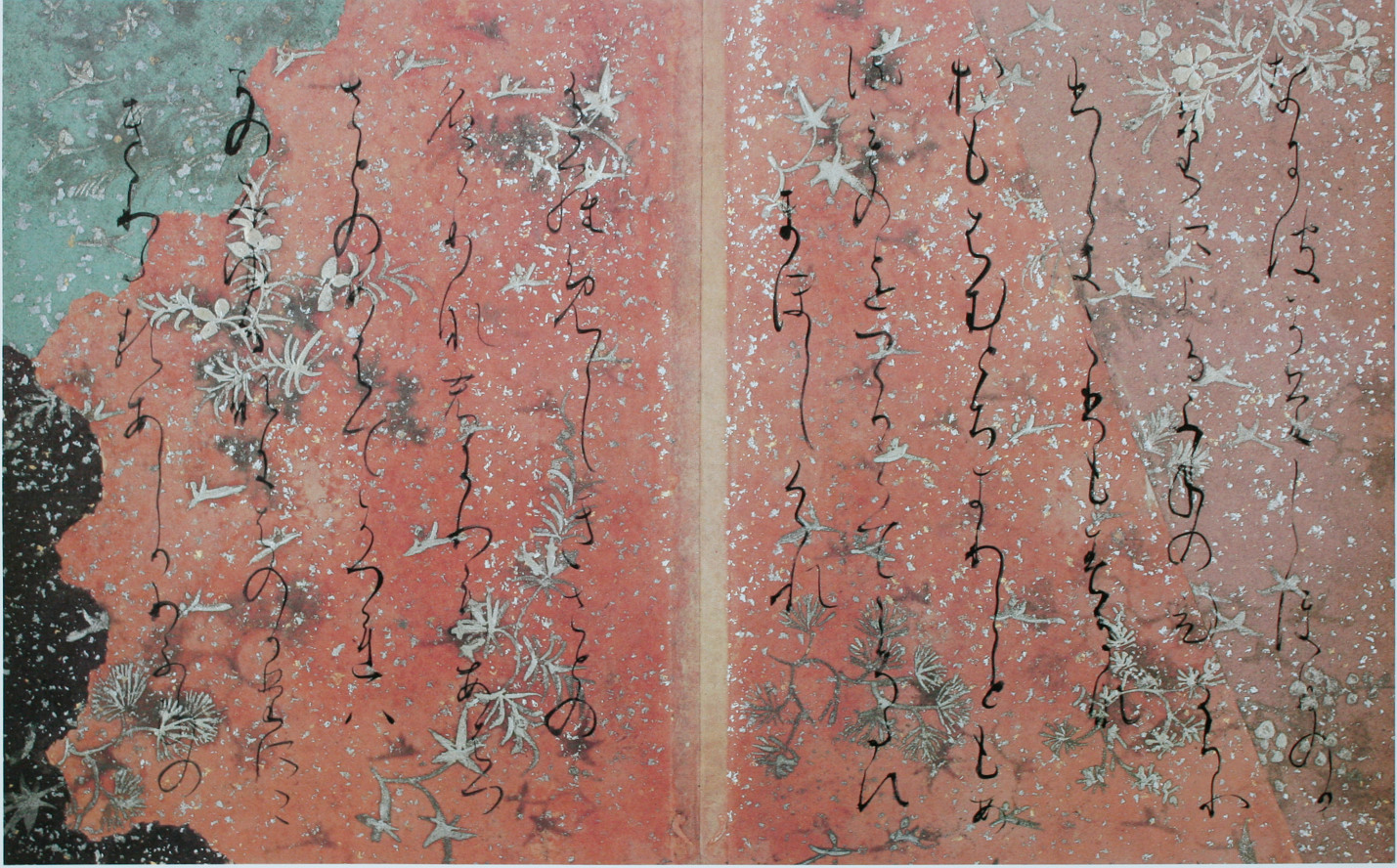
Minamoto no Saneakira volume

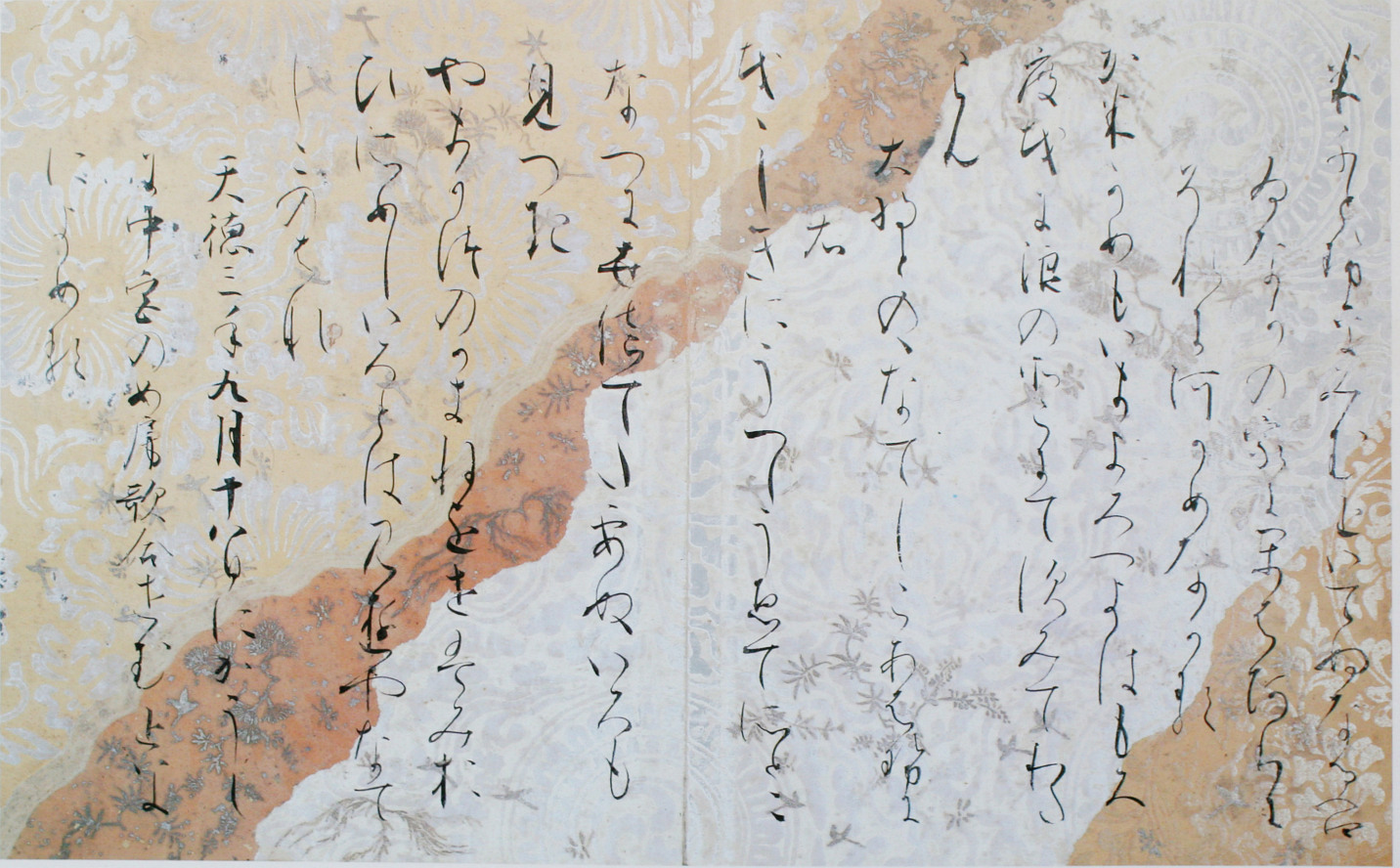
Fujiwara no Motozane volume

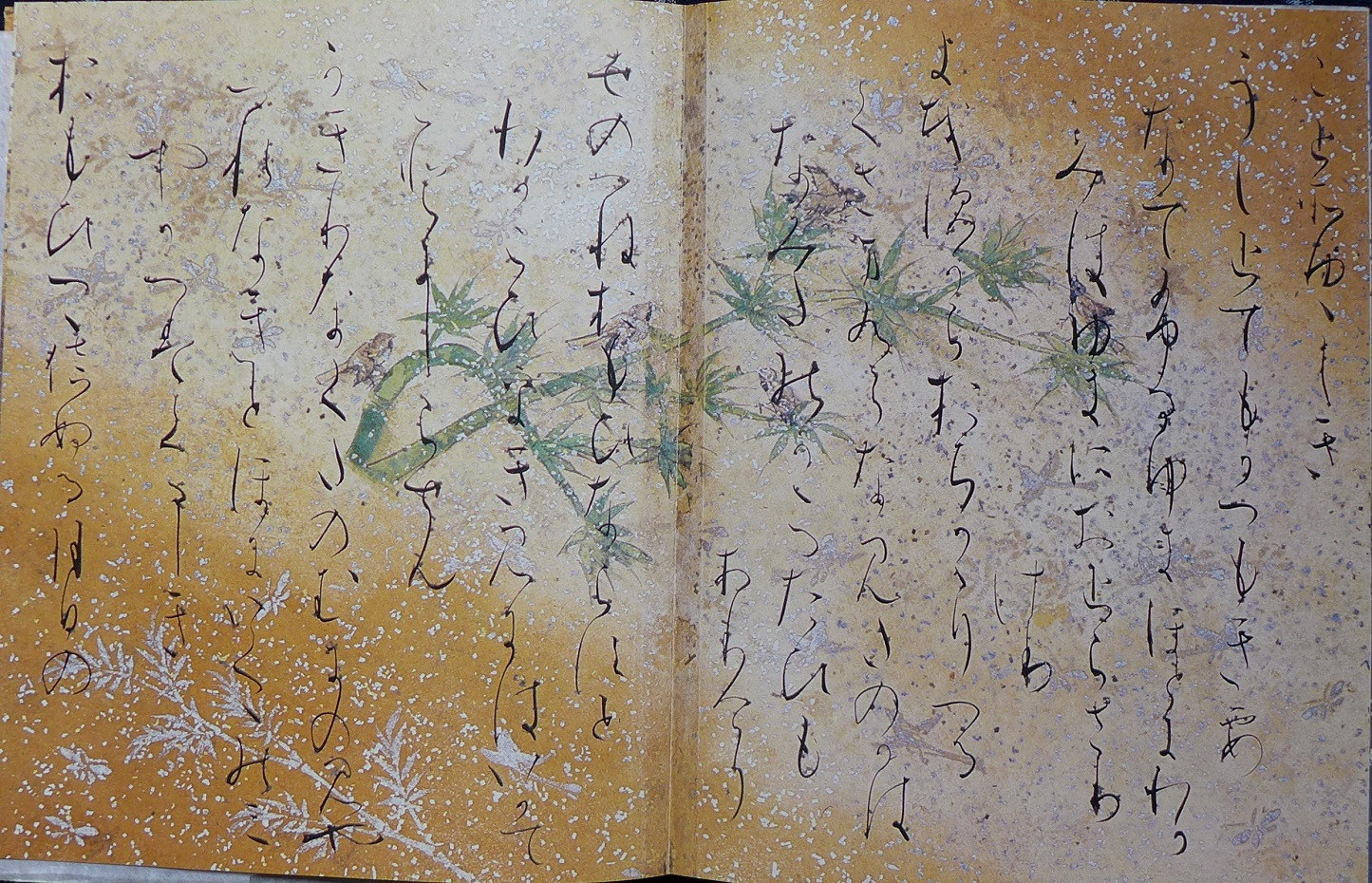
Fujiwara no Motozane volume

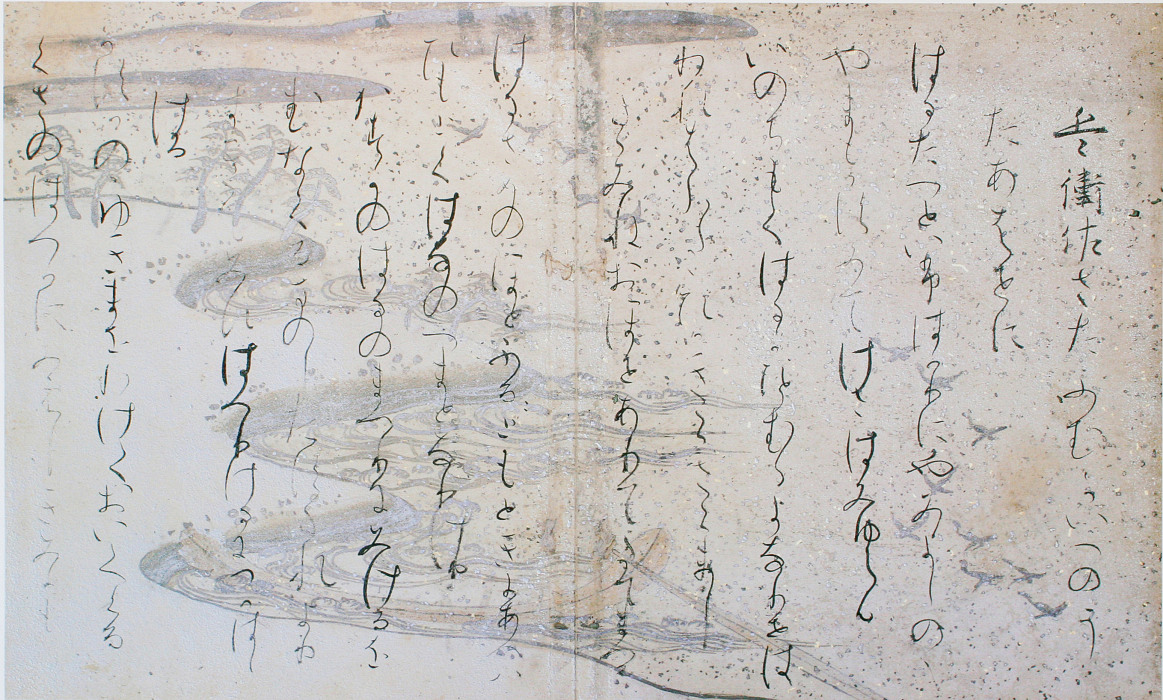
Mibu no Tadamine volume

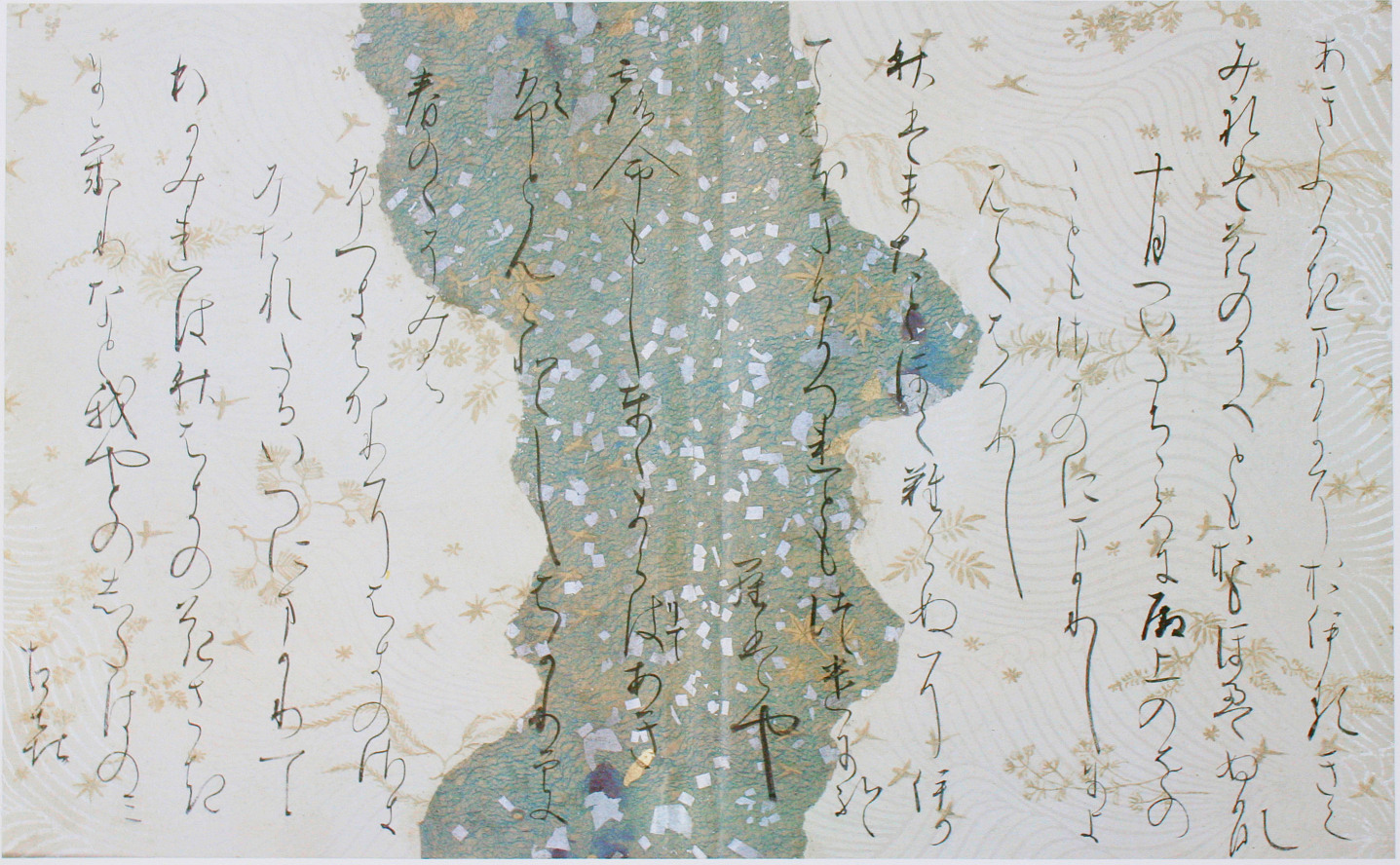
Kiyohara no Motosuke

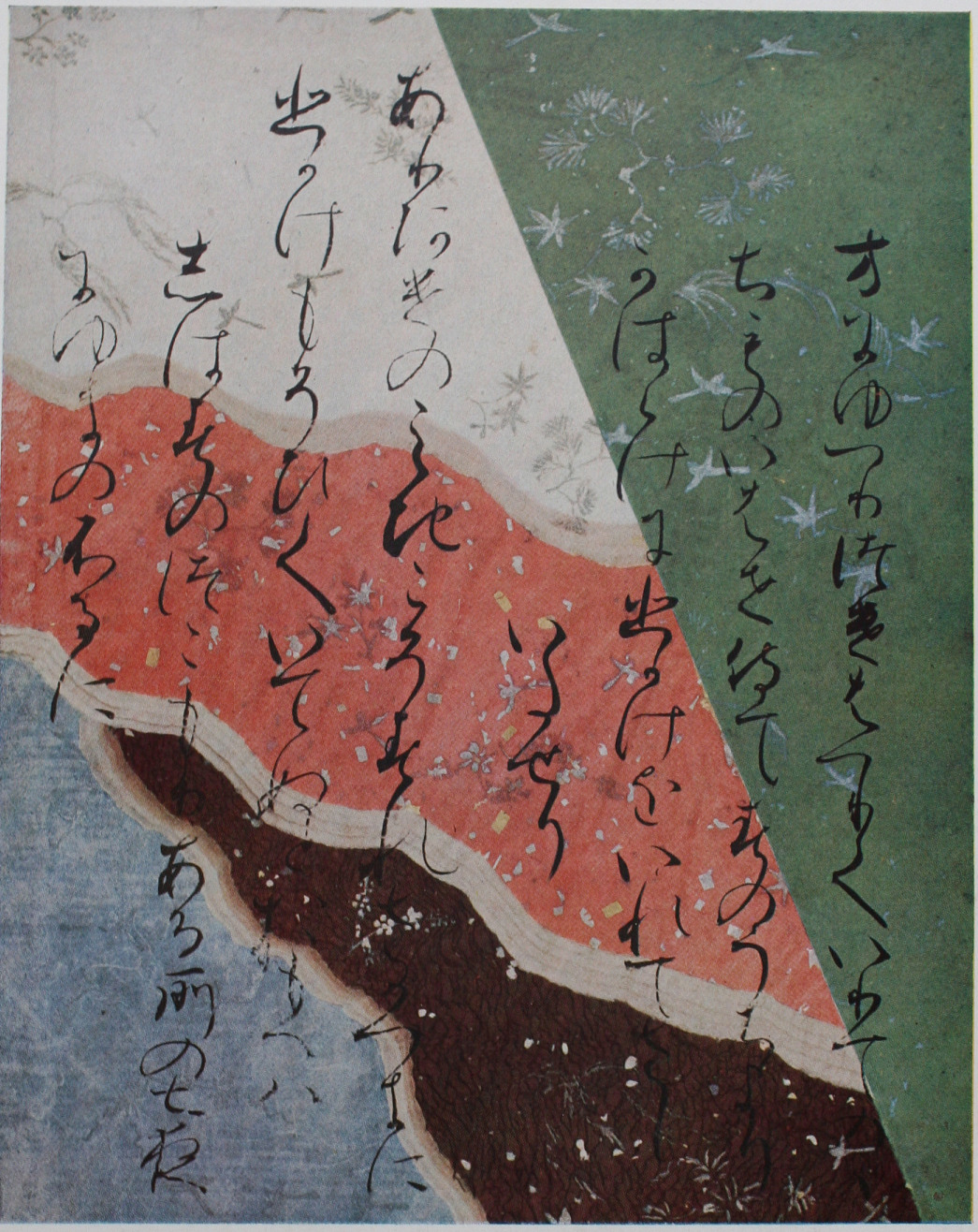
Ōnakatomi no Yoshinobu

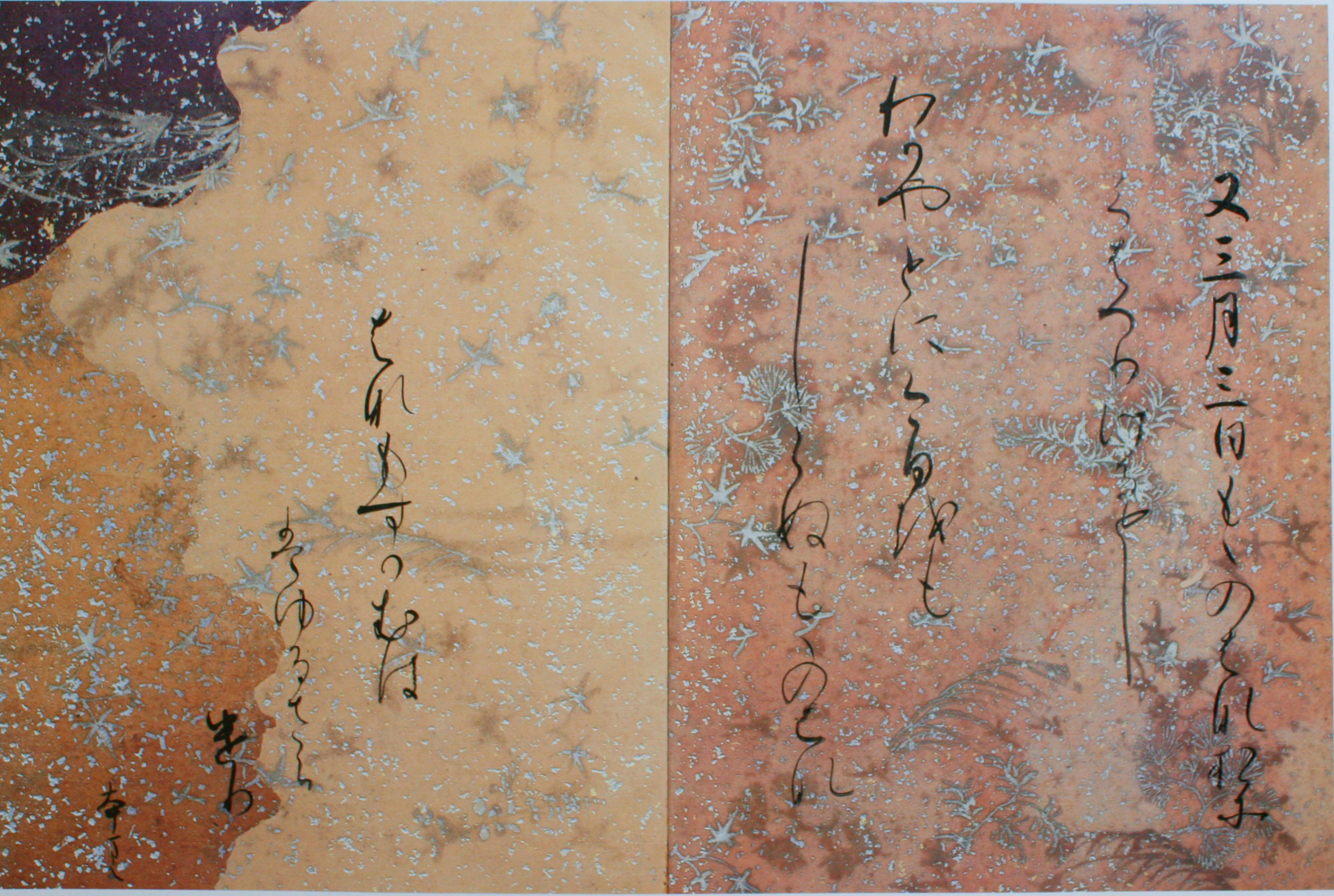
Taira no Kanemori volume

== Ishiyama-gire ==
In 1929, the two original volumes: the second volume of poems by Ki no Tsurayuki and the volume of those by Lady Ise, were dismembered into separate sheets and sold to collectors for the purpose of gaining funds for Musashino University. Masuda Takashi, manager of this sale, named fragments Ishiyama-gire. Most of them are mounted to hanging scroll format.

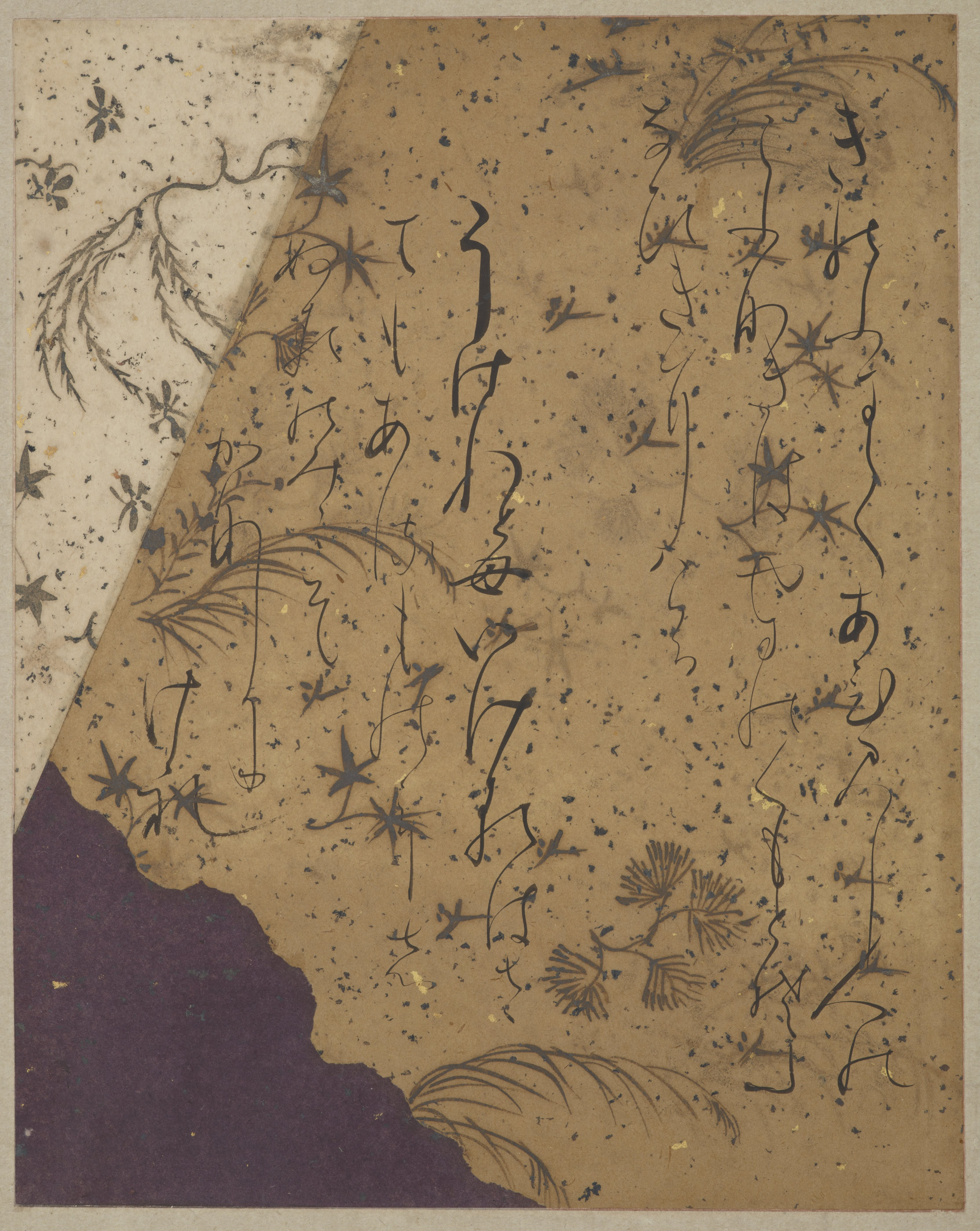
Ki no Tsurayuki Volume 2

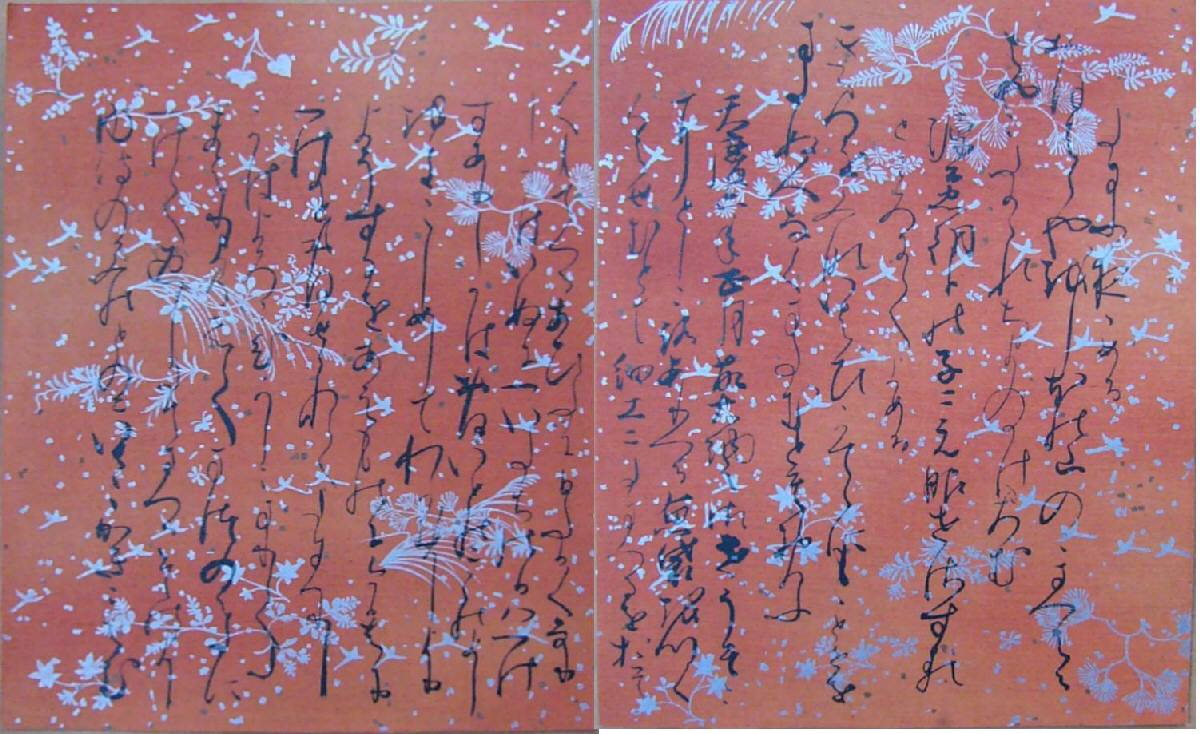
Ki no Tsurayuki Vol. 2

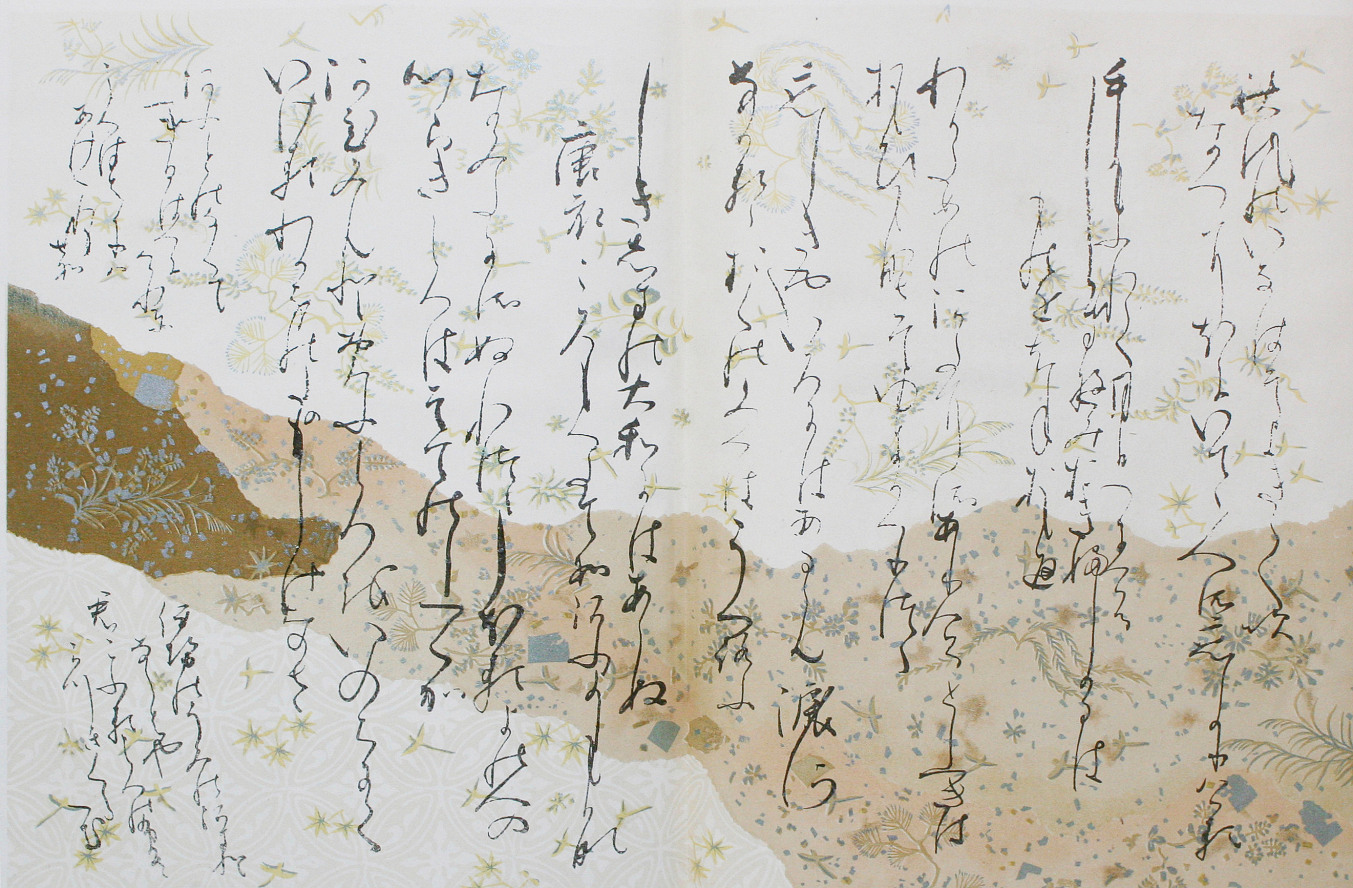
Ki no Tsurayuki Vol. 2

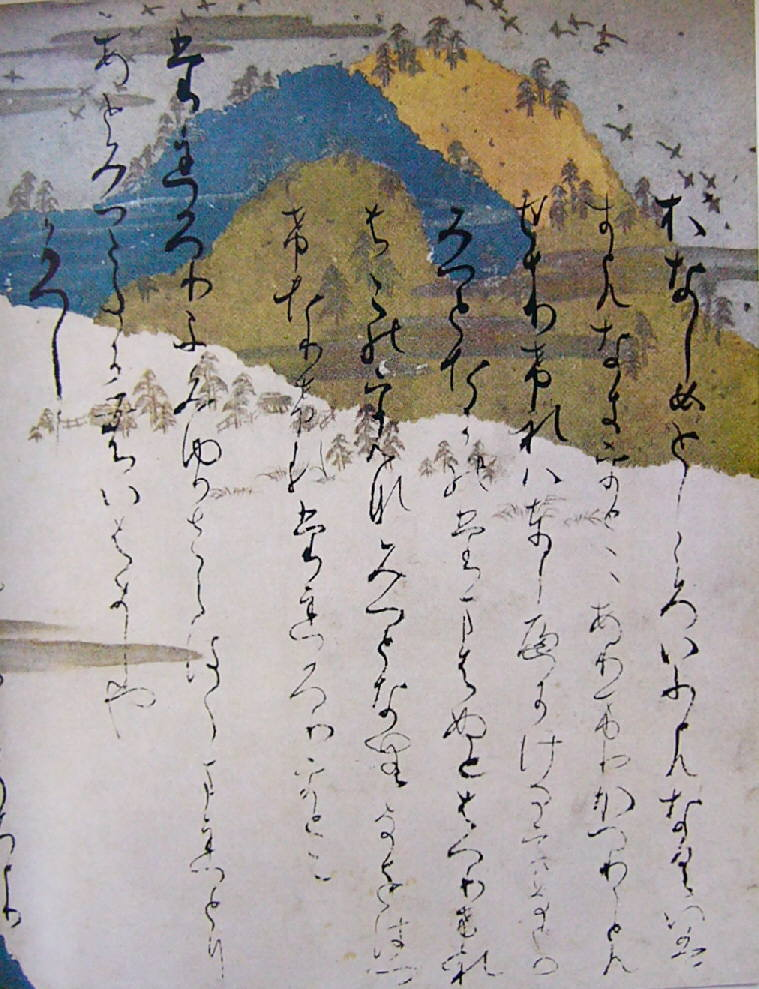
Lady IseMuseum of Japanese Art (Yamato Bunkakan, Nara)
