= Fujiwara no Asamitsu =

Japanese nobleman and waka poet (951–995)

Fujiwara no Asamitsu (藤原 朝光; 951–995) was a Japanese nobleman and waka poet of the Heian period. He was a member of the Fujiwara clan, which held significant political influence during this era.

== Life ==
Fujiwara no Asamitsu was born in Tenryaku 5 (951 in the Gregorian calendar). He was a son (Note: Oboroya states that he was the second son, while Nihon Jinmei Daijiten Plus calls him the fourth son.) of the kanpaku and dajō-daijin Kanemichi, a member of the Northern Branch of the Fujiwara clan. His mother was a daughter (Note: Hirano gives her name as 能子女王, while Oboroya gives her name as 昭子女王.) of Prince Ariakira.

Asamitsu's name, 朝光, is glossed by Sonpi Bunmyaku as アサテル (Asateru), but in her article on him for the Nihon Koten Bungaku Daijiten Yukiko Hirano states that あさみつ (Asamitsu), given in the Takamitsu-shū (高光集, the personal anthology of Fujiwara no Takamitsu) and the Koōgimi-shū (小大君集, the personal anthology of Koōgimi), is the more correct reading.

According to the Kugyō Bunin, Akinaka died on the twentieth day of the third month (Note: Hirano does not give an exact date (only the month), while Oboroya does not attribute this information to the Kugyō Bunin.) of Chōtoku 1 (22 April 995). He was 45 (by Japanese reckoning).

In addition to his poetry, Asamitsu held a high position in the imperial court and served as an important advisor to the Emperor. His political influence allowed him to promote and support other poets and writers of the Heian period.

== Poetry ==
Asamitsu's poetry was characterized by its elegance, simplicity, and depth of emotion. His works often explored the beauty of nature and the fleeting nature of human existence.

Asamitsu excelled in poems on the daily life of the noble class into which he was born, such as romantic exchanges.

He hosted uta-awase contests in his residence, but did not himself compete. The Horikawa Chūnagon-ke Uta-awase in Ten'en 3 (975) was organized by him.

27 (Note: Nihon Jinmei Daijiten Plus gives a figure of 29.) of his poems were included in imperial anthologies from the Shūishū on. He left a personal collection, the Asamitsu-shū.

Asamitsu's legacy as a poet and nobleman continues to be celebrated in Japan today. Many of his works have been included in anthologies of Japanese poetry and continue to be studied and appreciated for their beauty and insight into the culture and values of the Heian period.
