= Ōnakatomi no Sukechika =

Japanese poet and nobleman (954–1038)

Ōnakatomi no Sukechika (大中臣輔親, 954 – July 26, 1038)) was a Japanese waka poet, Shinto priest and noble from the middle Heian period. He was the son of Ōnakatomi no Yoshinobu. His poems are included in the Japanese imperial poetry anthology Shūi Wakashū. He also authored a personal collection entitled Sukechikadono-shū (輔親卿集). One of his poems was also included in the Aikoku Hyakunin Isshu of 1943.

His daughter was Ise no Taifu.
