= Fujiwara no Hideyoshi =

Fujiwara no Hideyoshi (藤原秀能 1184 - 1240) was a Heian period waka poet and Japanese nobleman. He is designated as a member of the New Thirty-six Poetry Immortals. Hideyoshi served as Naidaijin.
