= Sagami (poet) =

Japanese poet (born c. 1000)

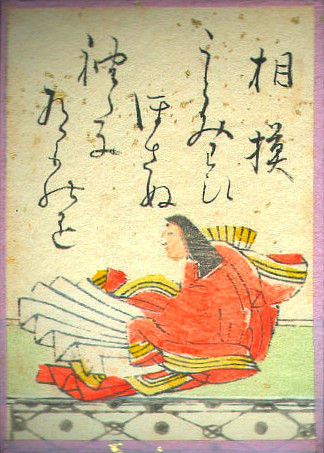
Sagami, from the Ogura Hyakunin Isshu.

Sagami (相模; dates unknown, but born c. 1000), also known as Oto-jijū (乙侍従), was a Japanese waka poet of the mid-Heian period. One of her poems was included in the Ogura Hyakunin Isshu. She produced a private collection, the Sagami-shū.

== Biography ==
Sagami's dates are unknown, but she was probably born around 1000. Her real name was Oto-jijū.

Her paternal ancestry is unknown, but she was supposedly a daughter of Minamoto no Yorimitsu. The fourteenth-century work Chokusen Sakusha Burui (勅撰作者部類) claims Yorimitsu was her father, but the Kin'yōshū includes a renga by Yorimitsu and "Sagami's mother" (相模母), so it is also possible he was her adoptive father. Her mother was a daughter of Yoshishige no Yasuaki, governor of Noto (前能登守慶滋保章).

She was married to Ōe no Kin'yori (大江公資; also read Kinsuke), during his tenure as the governor of Sagami Province, from which her nickname is derived. She served Imperial Princess Shūshi (脩子内親王, Shūshi-naishinnō), one of the daughters of Emperor Ichijō.

== Poetry ==
109 of her poems were included in imperial anthologies starting with the Goshūi Wakashū. She was included in the Late Classical Thirty-Six Immortals of Poetry.

The following poem by her was included as No. 65 in Fujiwara no Teika's Ogura Hyakunin Isshu:

Japanese text	Romanized Japanese	English translation
恨みわび ほさぬ袖だに あるものを 恋に朽ちなむ 名こそ惜しけれ	Urami-wabi hosanu sode dani aru mono wo koi ni kuchinan na koso oshikere	My sleeves will never dry with all these bitter tears of unrequited love. But even worse, the regret of having lost my good name— tainted by this love.

She produced a private collection, the Sagami-shū (相模集).

== Works cited ==
- "Sagami". Britannica Kokusai Dai-Hyakkajiten (in Japanese). Encyclopædia Britannica, Inc. 2014.
- "Sagami". Daijisen (in Japanese). Shogakukan. 1998.
- Keene, Donald (1999). A History of Japanese Literature, Vol. 1: Seeds in the Heart — Japanese Literature from Earliest Times to the Late Sixteenth Century. New York: Columbia University Press. ISBN 978-0-231-11441-7.
- McMillan, Peter (2010). One Hundred Poets, One Poem Each — A Translation of the Ogura Hyakunin Isshu. New York: Columbia University Press.
- Suzuki, Hideo; Yamaguchi, Shin'ichi; Yoda, Yasushi (2009). Genshoku: Ogura Hyakunin Isshu. Tokyo: Bun'eidō.
- Ueno, Satoru (1983a). "Sagami". Nihon Koten Bungaku Daijiten 日本古典文学大辞典 (in Japanese). Vol. 3. Tokyo: Iwanami Shoten. pp. 36–37. OCLC 11917421.
- Ueno, Satoru (1983b). "Sagami-shū". Nihon Koten Bungaku Daijiten 日本古典文学大辞典 (in Japanese). Vol. 3. Tokyo: Iwanami Shoten. pp. 37–38. OCLC 11917421.
