= Hotate Shinkawa =

Japanese writer

- 新川 帆立
- Born: February 21, 1991; Dallas, Texas, USA
- Education: University of Tokyo
- Occupations: Writer; lawyer
- Writing career
- Genre: Mystery fiction
- Notable works: My Ex-Boyfriend's Last Will and Testament; Guardian of the Market

Hotate Shinkawa (新川 帆立, Shinkawa Hotate; born February 21, 1991) is a Japanese writer, lawyer, and former professional mahjong player. Her first mystery novel, My Ex-Boyfriend's Last Will and Testament, won the This Mystery is Amazing! Grand Prize and was adapted for television by Fuji TV. Her followup novel, Guardian of the Market, was also adapted for television.

== Early life and education ==
Shinkawa was born in the United States in Dallas, Texas, but her family moved back to Japan when she was 6 months old. She spent her childhood in Miyazaki, then moved to Tsuchiura in Ibaraki Prefecture, where she attended high school. In high school she took up the game of Go, eventually participating in Japan's national high school Go tournament. As a high school student, Shinkawa had aspirations to become a novelist, but decided to pursue a stable professional career until she could write for a living.

Originally Shinkawa was on the path to becoming a physician, but after passing the science entrance exam at the University of Tokyo on the second try, she changed her focus and transferred to the literature track, where she became interested in studying law after taking a particularly interesting seminar course. While working a part-time job at a mahjong parlor as an undergraduate at the University of Tokyo, Shinkawa became interested in the game and developed her skill enough to become a professional player. She continued her professional mahjong career while attending law school at the University of Tokyo, and during her first legal internship. She passed the bar exam at the age of 24.

== Career ==
Shinkawa worked as an attorney at a law firm after graduating, but drove herself to exhaustion and collapse through excessive overtime. She quit her law firm job at the age of 26, switched to a corporate job doing legal work, and took a novel-writing class. Driven by frustrations about gender inequalities experienced in the legal workplace, she wrote My Boyfriend's Last Will and Testament, a story about a woman lawyer in her late 20s named Reiko Kenmochi whose boyfriend dies and leaves a will specifying that his murderer should inherit his estate. She based the main character on herself, drawing on details from her own workplace, and wrote the book in about three weeks.

My Boyfriend's Last Will and Testament won the 2020 This Mystery is Amazing! Grand Prize, which is a juried competitive award for mystery novels that comes with a ¥12,000,000 monetary award. The book sold over 180,000 copies in the first month of release. In a review for the Asahi Shimbun, the critic Abe Kashou noted that while the solution of the mystery depended on specialist legal knowledge, the story's narrative elements had universal appeal. Writing for Da Vinci, reviewer Minami Asatō wrote that the "money-loving" Reiko was an "intense" main character, and that the story was one of the most exciting she had read in a long time.

Shinkawa's followup novel Guardian of the Market, a story about a Fair Trade Commission investigator looking into price collusion in the wedding industry, was published in 2022 by Kodansha. That same year, both My Ex-Boyfriend's Last Will and Testament and Guardian of the Market were adapted for television. My Ex-Boyfriend's Last Will and Testament was adapted into a Fuji TV series of the same name, starring Haruka Ayase as Reiko Kenmochi, that aired in spring 2022. Guardian of the Market was adapted into a Fuji TV series of the same name, starring Kentaro Sakaguchi and Anne Watanabe, that aired in fall 2022.

== Personal life ==
Shinkawa has a long-term domestic partner, but has not officially registered the marriage because it would legally require changing her name, which she opposes.
