= Anpō =

Japanese waka poet of the Heian period

Anpō (安法; dates unknown) was a Japanese waka poet of the Heian period. His given name was Minamoto no Shitagō (源趁); Anpō was his Dharma name. He had prestigious ancestry, but his immediate family fell on hard times. He entered religion and withdrew to an old mansion that had been built by one of his most famous ancestors. Many of his poems are on the theme of impermanence or are laments of his lost youth. He was included in the Late Classical Thirty-Six Immortals of Poetry, and twelve of his poems were included in imperial anthologies.

== Biography ==
Minamoto no Shitagō was a member of the Saga Genji, descendants of Emperor Saga who adopted the clan name Minamoto. His birth and death dates are unknown. He was a grandson of the dainagon Minamoto no Noboru (848–918). His father was Minamoto no Hajime (源適) and his mother was supposedly a daughter of Ōnakatomi no Yasunori.

Although his house were descended from the prestigious Minister of the Left Minamoto no Tōru, during the time of his father the family's fortunes had taken a downturn. Possibly for this reason, Shitagō abandoned political ambitions and entered religion, becoming a monk and adopting the Dharma name Anpō.

After entering Buddhist orders, he took up residence in the Kawara-no-in, the mansion his ancestor Tōru had built. Although the building was already in disrepair, there was never any shortage of antiquarians infatuated with the era Kokin Wakashū coming to visit his home.

== Poetry ==
Anpō was included in the Late Classical Thirty-Six Immortals of Poetry.

Twelve of his poetry were included in imperial anthologies from the Shūi Wakashū on. He left a private collection, the Anpō-hōshi Shū (安法法師集).

Most of the poems included in his private collection were apparently composed on set topics for uta-awase contests, or were presented to others as part of his daily correspondences. He left very few "official" poems. Many of his surviving poems are on themes like the impermanence of things or laments of the poet's own old age.

== Works cited ==
- Hirata, Yoshinobu (1983). "Anpō". Nihon Koten Bungaku Daijiten 日本古典文学大辞典 (in Japanese). Vol. 1. Tokyo: Iwanami Shoten. pp. 107–108. OCLC 11917421.
