= Ise no Taifu =

Japanese poet

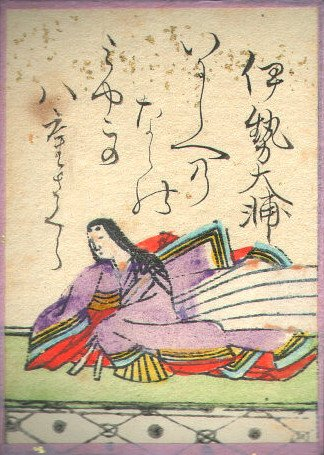
Ise no Taifu, from Ogura Hyakunin Isshu.

Ise no Taifu (伊勢大輔), also known as Ise no Tayū or Ise no Ōsuke, was a Japanese waka poet active in the later Heian period (early 11th century).

She is one of the later Thirty-six Poetry Immortals, and one of her poems is included in the Ogura Hyakunin Isshu. Her contemporaries include Uma no Naishi, Murasaki Shikibu, and Sei Shōnagon. A diptych of her exists in Nihon Meijo Banashi (Stories of Famous Japanese Women), implying that although little of her work exists into modernity, she was considered a critically important figurehead of the waka poetry movement, both as a Poetry Immortal and as a woman of renown.

Her grandfather, Ōnakatomi no Yoshinobu, was also an important waka poet.

Her mother, Kura no Myobu, served Fujiwara no Yorimichi, the first son of the powerful Michinaga, so she could get a support and joined to the imperial court. She became friends with Murasaki Shikibu and Izumi Shikibu. She was talented in music, so she was very popular and noble lady-in-waiting who moreover, could write poems and songs.

== Poetry ==
Only a few of no Taifu's poems have survived into modernity, translated in part due to Waka poetry anthologies:

Japanese

散り積もる
木の葉が下の
忘れ水
澄むとも見えず
絶間のみして

Rōmaji

Chiritsumoru
Konoha ga shita no
Wasuremizu
Sumu tomo miezu
Taema nomi shite

English

Scattered and drifted are
The leaves from the trees, and beneath is
A forgotten stream
How unclear it seems,
Appearing only now and then...

One of her poems was included in the Ogura Hyakunin Isshu:

Japanese

いにしへの
奈良の都の
八重桜
けふ九重に
にほひぬるかな

Rōmaji

Inishie no
Nara no miyako no
Yaezakura
Kyō kokonoe ni
Nioinuru kana

English

The double cherry trees
Of the ancient capital
Nara
Today must extend their fragrance
To the imperial palace.

Below is another of her poems, translated in the Asia-Pacific Journal:

Japanese

おき明かし
見つつ眺むる
萩の上の
露ふき乱る
秋の夜の風

Rōmaji

Oki akashi
Mitsutsu nagamuru
Hagi no ue no
Tsuyu fuki midaru
Aki no yo no kaze

English

Peering hour after sleepless hour
into the dark, my vacant gaze fixes
on the dew scattered
atop the bush clover
by the autumn night’s wind
