= Yoshiko Sembon =

Japanese screenwriter and director (born 1928)

- せんぼん よしこ
- Born: November 6, 1928 (age 97); Dalian, Manchuria, China
- Education: Waseda University
- Occupations: Director; Screenwriter
- Years active: 1953—present

Yoshiko Sembon (せんぼんよしこ; born November 6, 1928 in Dalian) is a Japanese screenwriter and director.

== Biography ==
Yoshiko Sembon was born November 6, 1928, in Dalian, then in the Manchuria region of China. When she was nine, Sembon relocated to Japan with her family and settled down in Tateyama, Chiba. While there, she attended Awa Minami High School. Her father died after the end of World War II and she moved with her mother and sister to Tokyo, where she attended Waseda University's drama school. In 1953, she began working at the newly created Nippon Television. She worked primarily in television but later expanded to film, and continued to work even after retiring from Nippon TV.

Sembon's directorial feature-film debut, Red Whale, White Snake (Akai kujira to shiroi hebi), was released on November 25, 2006 when she was 78 years old. The film was inspired by her childhood in Chiba Prefecture.

== Awards ==
- 1961: First Director Award from the Japan Writers Association
- 1961: Japan Media Arts Festival Encouragement Award for En (縁)
- 1980: Japan Media Arts Festival Grand Prize for Otake shinobu no a! Kono ai nakuba ganbasseyo Kuni-chan (ああ! この愛なくば)
- 1980: TV Excellent Individual Award for Otake shinobu no a! Kono ai nakuba ganbasseyo Kuni-chan (ああ! この愛なくば)
- 2006: Special Female Director Award at the Japanese Movie Critics Awards for Akai kujira to shiroi hebi (赤い鯨と白い蛇)
- 2007: Fujimoto Newcomer Award for Akai kujira to shiroi hebi (赤い鯨と白い蛇)

== Selected filmography ==
- 1980: Otake shinobu no a! Kono ai nakuba ganbasseyo Kuni-chan (ああ! この愛なくば)
- 1981: Haha taru koto wa jigoku no gotoku (母たることは地獄のごとく)
- 1981: Yama o hashiru on'na (山を走る女)
- 1983: Kiri no hata (霧の旗)
- 1987: Akai yūhi no daichi de ― ieji ― (赤い夕日の大地で ―家路―)
- 1988: Nagasaki (長崎)
- 1995: Hito sarai (ひとさらい)
- 1999: Suki? (好き?)
- 2006: Akai kujira to shiroi hebi (赤い鯨と白い蛇)
