= Kodai no Kimi =

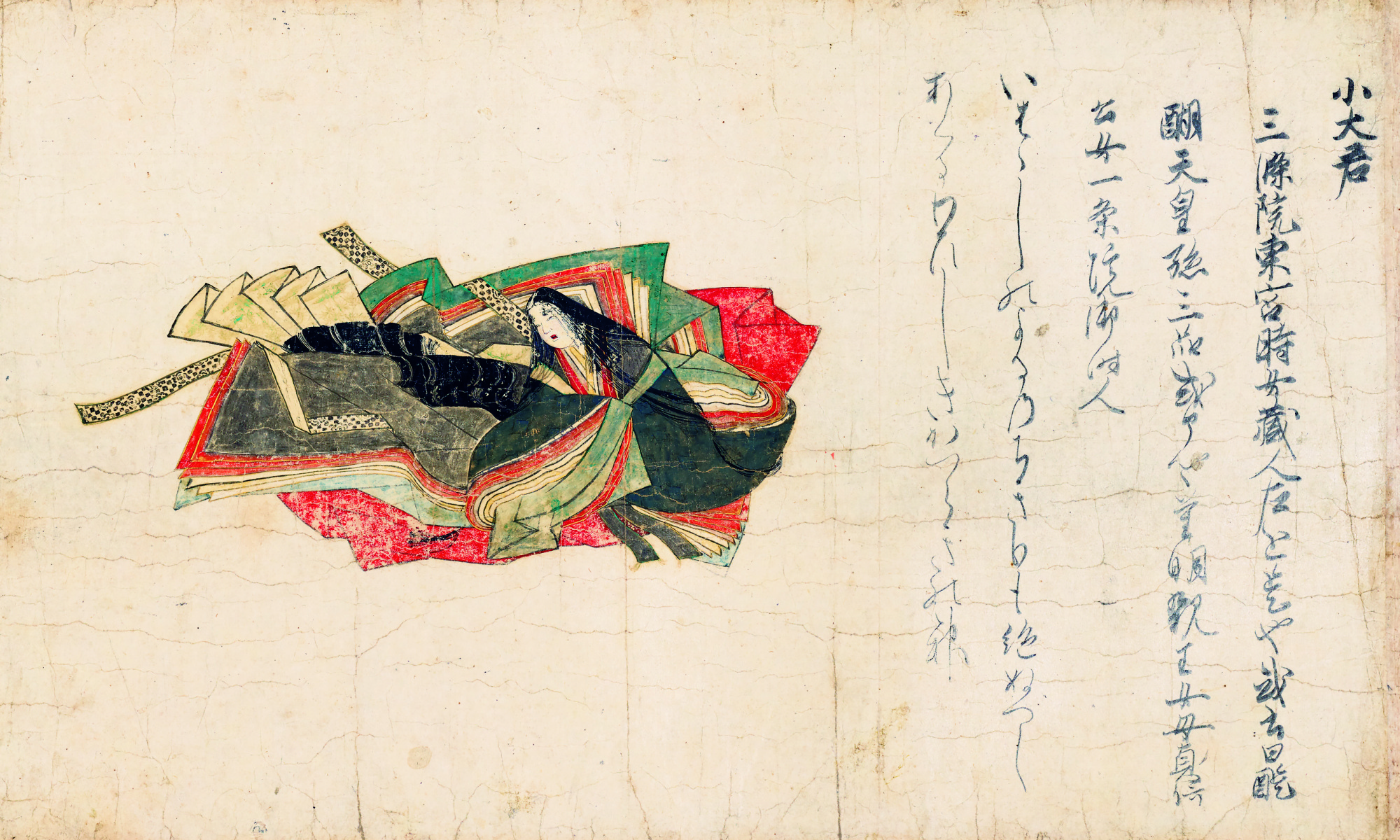
Kodai no Kimi (ICP) (Yamato Bunkakan)

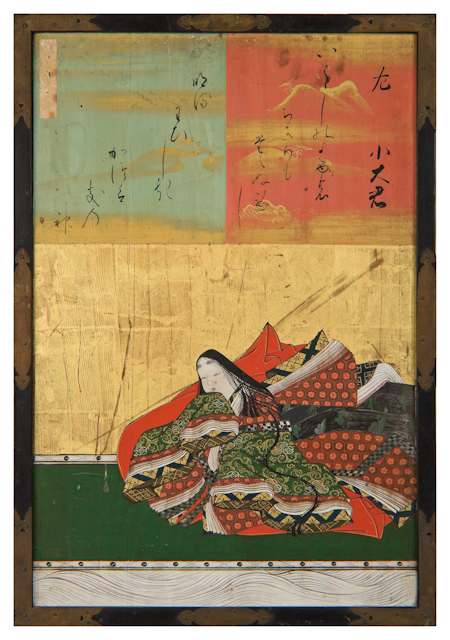
Kodai no Kimi by Kanō Naonobu, 1648

Kodai no Kimi (小大君, fl. circa 990 CE), also known as Koōgimi) was a Japanese waka poet and noble from the middle Heian period.

During this period of time, the Japanese court was a place of literary flourishing for noble women, and many of the ladies in waiting were accomplished poets and authors. For instance, she was at court as the same time as another renowned female writer, Murasaki Shikibu, author of the great novel The Tale of Genji.

Kodai no Kimi was a lady-in-waiting in the courts of Emperor Ichijo (who reigned from 986-1011 CE) and his son, the crown prince Okisada who would eventually reign as Emperor Sanjo. In the court of the Crown prince, her position appears to have been that of chamberlain and secretary. Members of the court were expected to participate complex poetic activities, writing poems to exchange for everything from greetings to games to poet-vs-poet competitions. Kodai-no-Kimi was one of the most skilled.

She is one of only five women numbered as one of the Thirty-six Poetry Immortals.

Many of her poems are in Japanese imperial poetry anthologies including Shūi Wakashū. There is some overlap between her personal poetry collection Kodai no Kimishū (小大君集) and Ono no Komachi's personal collection.
