= Taira no Kanemori =

Japanese poet

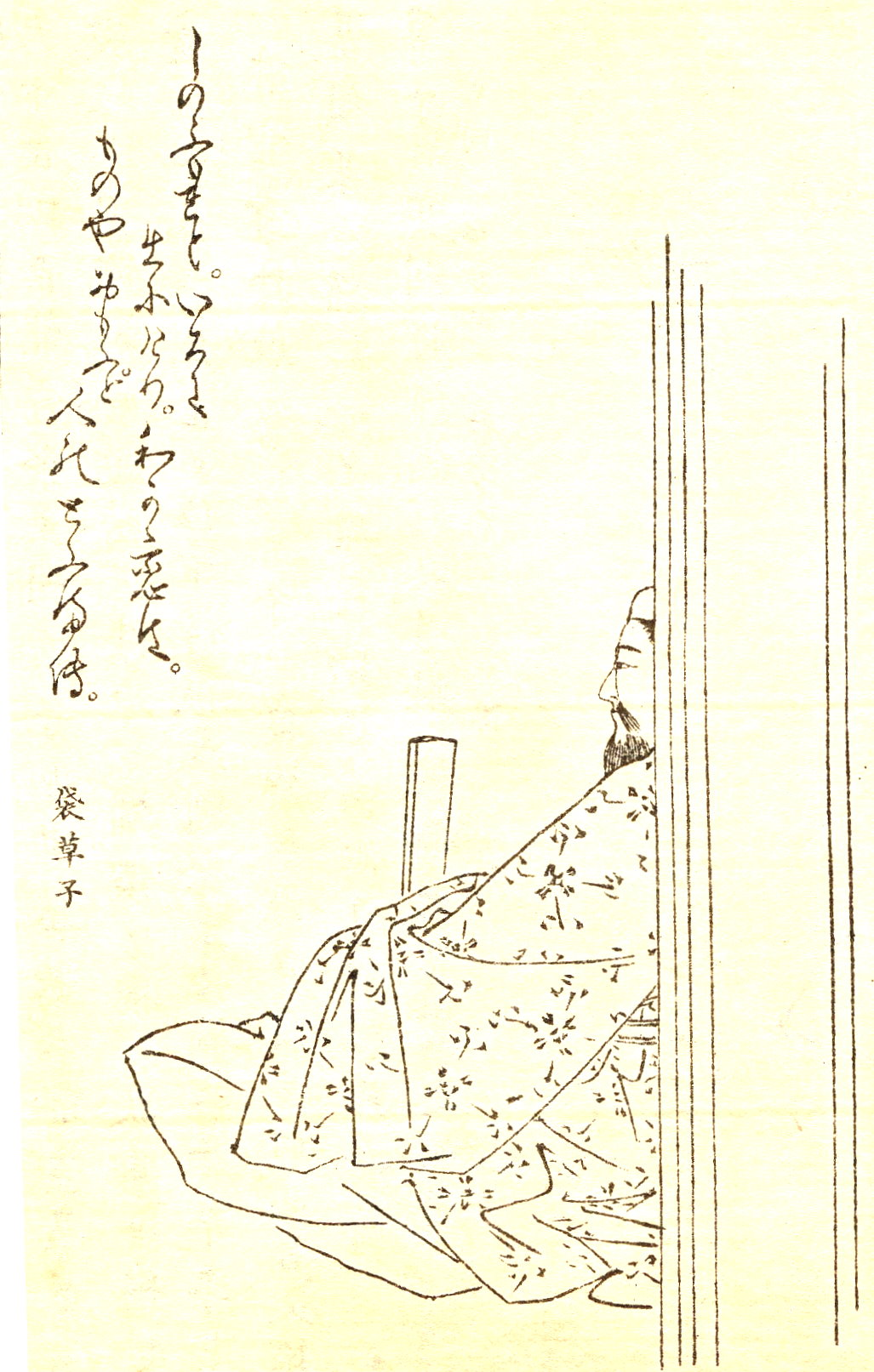
Taira no Kanemori by Kikuchi Yosai

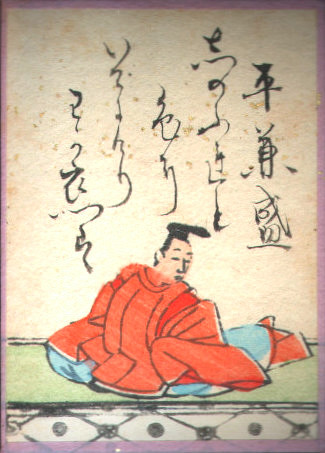
Taira no Kanemori, from the Ogura Hyakunin Isshu.

Taira no Kanemori ( ? –991, 平 兼盛) was a middle Heian period waka poet and Japanese nobleman. He is designated as a member of the Thirty-six Poetry Immortals and one of his poems is included in the famous anthology Hyakunin Isshu. He was a member of the Taira clan.

Kanemori's poems are included in several official poetry anthologies from the Heian Era. A personal collection known as the Kanemorishū (兼盛集) also remains. His daughter Akazome Emon was also a distinguished waka poet, though she is usually reckoned as the daughter of her adoptive father, Akazome Tokimochi.
