= Ōnakatomi no Yoshinobu =

Japanese poet and nobleman (921–991)

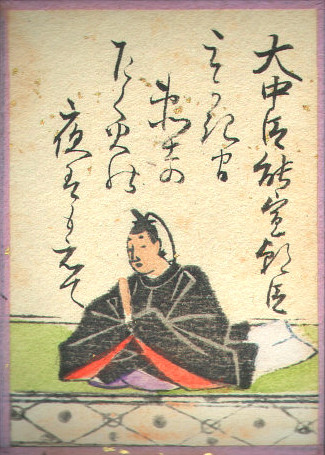
Ōnakatomi no Yoshinobu, from the Ogura Hyakunin Isshu.

Ōnakatomi no Yoshinobu (大中臣 能宣; 921–991), also Ōnakatomi no Yoshinobu Ason (大中臣能宣朝臣), was a middle Heian period Japanese nobleman and waka poet. He is designated as a member of the Thirty-six Poetry Immortals, and one of his poems is included in the Ogura Hyakunin Isshu, but one theory holds that his entry in this anthology was not actually written by him.

As one of the Five Men of the Pear Chamber (梨壺の五人), Yoshinobu assisted in the compilation of the Gosen Wakashū. He also compiled kundoku (訓読) readings for texts from the Man'yōshū.

Ōnakatomi no Yoshinobu's poems are included in several official poetry anthologies, including the Shūi Wakashū. A personal collection known as the Yoshinobushū (能宣集) also remains. His son Ōnakatomi no Sukechika was also an important Heian poet, and his granddaughter was the famous later Heian poet Ise no Taiu.
