= Uma no Naishi =

Japanese waka poet and noblewoman (949–1011)

Uma no Naishi (馬内侍; 949–1011) was a Japanese waka poet and noble from the middle Heian period. She is enumerated as one of the Thirty-Six Female Immortals of Poetry alongside famous authors, poets, and contemporaries Sei Shōnagon and Murasaki Shikibu.

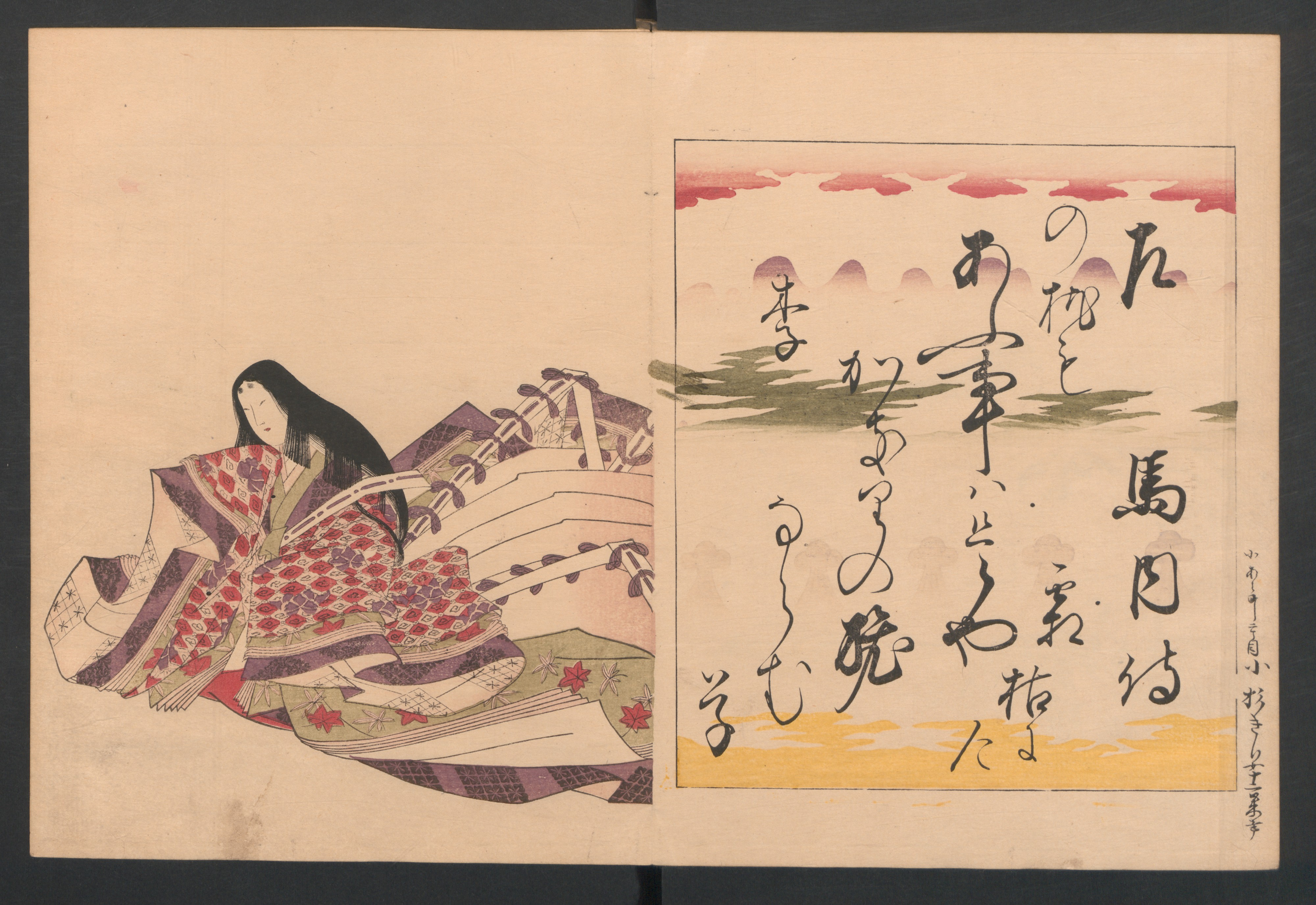
Naishi depicted in an 1801 woodblock print by Eishi

Naishi, as a contemporary and follower of Shōnagon, was a lady of the same court in Heian period Japan, and bettered her knowledge of waka poetry through her connection to Shōnagon, who was famously known for her waka poetry as well as her novel of courtly observations, The Pillow Book (枕草子, makura no sōshi). Shōnagon was a notorious rival of fellow Immortal of Poetry, Murasaki Shikibu, author of The Tale of Genji.

Her poems are included in the Japanese imperial poetry anthology Shūi Wakashū. She also has a personal collection entitled Uma no Naishi-shū (馬内侍集).

At some point in her life, she had a love affair with Major Captain of the Left Asamitsu, writing a poem for him. Of the waka poems she wrote, only three have survived into modernity. Near the end of her life, Naishi took Buddhist vows and withdrew to a temple.

== Writing ==
いかなれば知らぬにおふるうき蓴苦しや心人知れずのみ
ikanareba siranu ni oFuru uki nunaFa kurusi ya kokoro Fito sirezu nomi	Why is that All unnoticed grows A floating water shield? How pained is a heart That no one knows at all...

うつろふは下葉ばかりと見しほどにやがても秋になりにけるかな
utsuroFu Fa sitaba bakari to misi Fodo ni yagate mo aki ni narinikeru kana	Change has touched The under-leaves alone – When I saw that At last, our autumn Had arrived!

ちはやぶるかものやしろの神もきけ君わすれずはわれもわすれじ
tiFayaburu kamo no yasiro no kami mo kike kimi wasurezu Fa ware mo wasurezi	Puissant Kamo Shrine's Deity, hear me! If my love forsakes me not, Then never will I forsake him!

This poem was written in response to a confession of love by Asamitsu, Major Captain of the Left.
