= Shunzei's daughter =

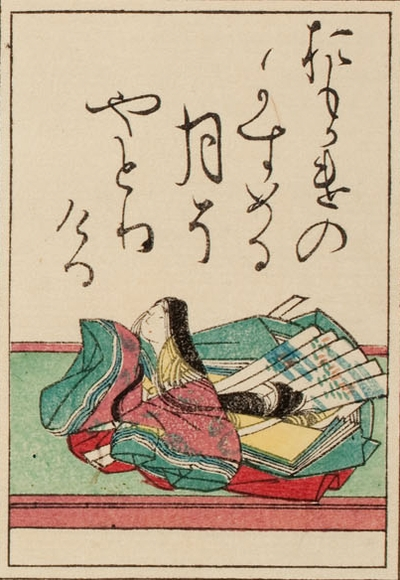
1851 painting of Shunzei's daughter

Fujiwara no Shunzei no Musume (藤原俊成女; "Fujiwara no Shunzei's daughter"; also occasionally called 藤原俊成卿女, 皇(太)后宮大夫俊成(卿)女 or 越部禅尼, 1171? - 1254), was a Japanese poet; she was probably the greatest female poet of her day, ranked with Princess Shikishi. Although she was called Shunzei's Daughter, Shunzei was in fact her grandfather, who adopted her, and her birth father's name was Fujiwara no Moriyori. Her grandfather likely adopted her after her father was implicated in the Shishigatani incident for the crimes of Fujiwara no Narichika.

Her grandfather was the noted poet Fujiwara no Shunzei, and her half-uncle was Fujiwara no Teika, who thought enough of her talents to seek her out for advice and criticism after Shunzei died, although she did not hesitate to castigate him when he completed the Shinchokusen Wakashū, for Teika had turned against his former ideal poetic style of yoen (ethereal beauty) while Shunzei's Daughter had not- thus she found Teika's previous efforts to be markedly inferior, and even according to Donald Keene, "declared that if it had not been compiled by Teika she would have refused even to take it into her hands." (in a letter sent to Fujiwara no Tameie, Teika's son). She and others also criticized it for apparently deliberately excluding any of the objectively excellent poems produced by the three Retired Emperors exiled in the aftermath of the Jōkyū War. Personal pique may also have played a role, since she saw 29 of her poems selected for the Shinkokinshū, while only nine were chosen for the Shin Chokusenshū.

After giving birth to a son and a daughter, she took Buddhist vows in 1213.

== Quote ==
How can I blame the cherry blossoms
for rejecting this floating world
and drifting away as the wind calls them?

== See also ==
- Mumyōzōshi, a text on literary criticism presumably written by Shunzei's daughter
