= Minamoto no Tomochika =

Japanese poet

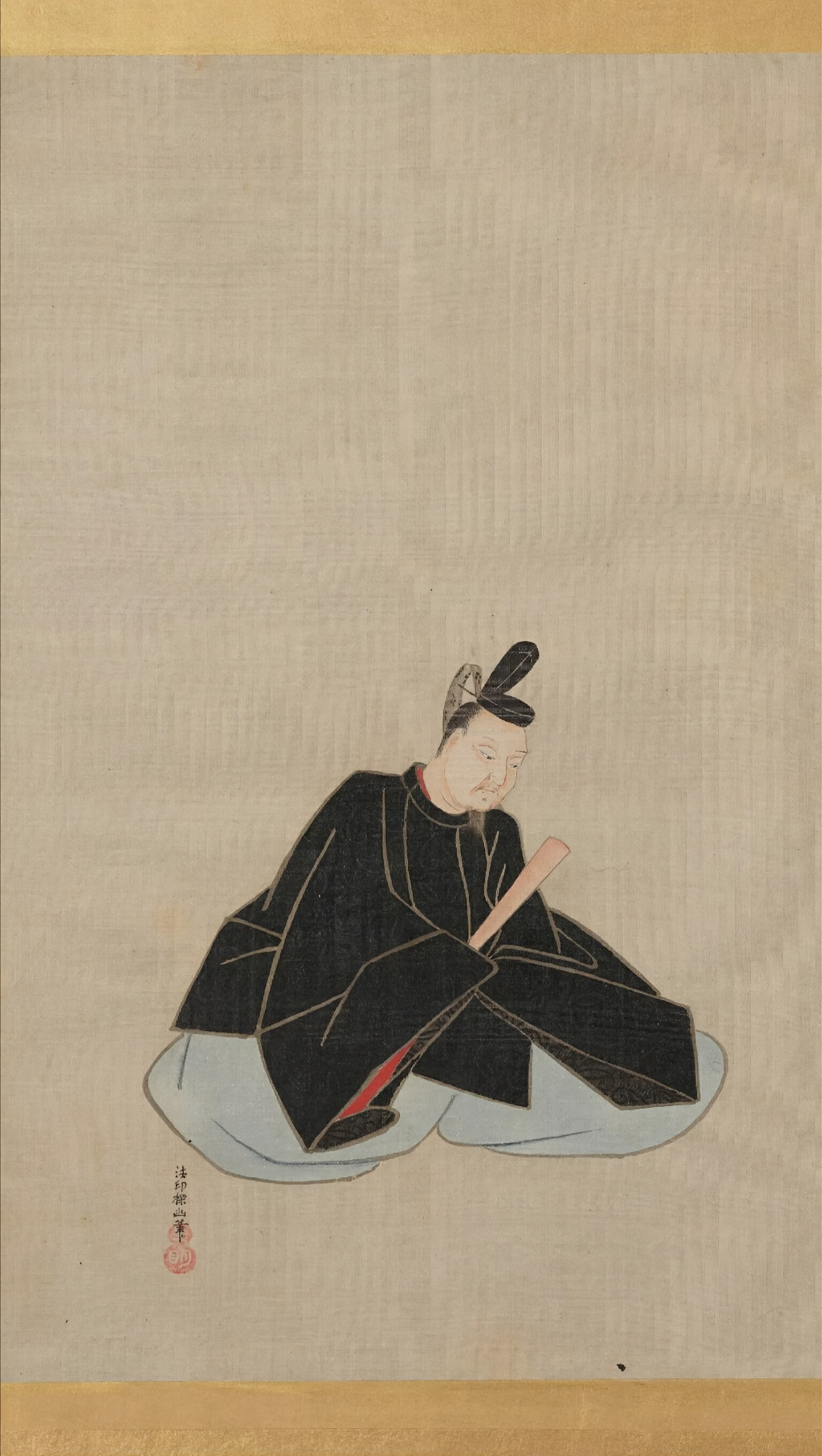
1664 portrait of Minamoto

Minamoto no Tomochika (源具親, dates unknown) was a waka poet and Japanese nobleman active in the early Kamakura period. He is designated as a member of the New Thirty-Six Immortals of Poetry (新三十六歌仙, Shinsanjūrokkasen).

In 1233, (Tenpuku era), he took tonsure as a Buddhist monk and was given the Dharma name Nyoshun (如舜).
