= Princess Shikishi =

Japanese classical poet

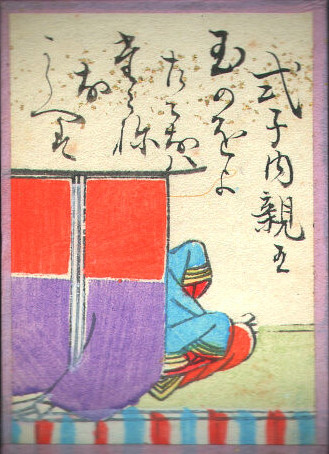
Shikishi Naishinnō in the Hyakunin Isshu.

Princess Shikishi or Shokushi (式子内親王, Shikishi/Shokushi Naishinnō) (1149 – March 1, 1201) was a celebrated Japanese classical poet, who lived during the late Heian and early Kamakura periods. She was the third daughter of Emperor Go-Shirakawa. In 1159, Shikishi, who did not marry, went into service as saiin at the Kamo Shrine in Kyoto. She left the shrine after some time, and in her later years became a Buddhist nun.

Shikishi is credited with 49 poems in the Shinkokinshū, a collection of some 2,000 popular works compiled in the early Kamakura period, and many other poems included in the Senzai Wakashū, compiled in the late Heian period to commemorate her father's ascension, and later compilations.

The poet's name is sometimes also pronounced as Shokushi (both on-yomi readings). Modern given names using the same characters include Shikiko (mix of on- and kun-yomi) and Noriko (pure kun-yomi). Her title of naishinnō translates to “Imperial Princess”.

== Biography ==
Though her exact date of birth is unknown, it is estimated that Princess Shikishi was born in 1150, and she died in the year 1201. She was the third daughter of Go-Shirakawa, seventy-seventh emperor of Japan beginning in the year 1155. During her lifetime, Japan saw turbulent times like the Hōgen and Heiji rebellions of 1156 and 1159, respectively, which involved competing samurai clans vying for political power. There were also numerous natural disasters, including a tornado, a famine, and an earthquake, all of which wreaked destruction on Japan's inhabitants.

During all this action, Shikishi was cloistered away for much of the time. In 1159, the Kamo Shrine chose her to be their thirty-first saiin or high priestess. An emperor-appointed position, the saiin represented the emperor by attending to the primary deities at the major Shinto shrines. To be saiin was an important and luxurious job—she factored largely in the annual rite, called the Kamo no Matsuri or Aoi Matsuri, which was celebrated with a great festival every year. She also had many attendants and lived in her own palace, but saiin could be a rather lonely appointment, as the girl would move away from her family and remain mostly separate from the public. As saiin, Shikishi would have lived near the capital, and her large number of attendants provided ample company; however, this career came with many restrictions and the government policies at the time made it difficult for princesses to marry. Shikishi remained in this position for ten years until she became ill, forcing her to depart the shrine in 1169. She dealt with several illnesses over the rest of her life, including what was probably breast cancer.

Around 1181, Shikishi became acquainted with Fujiwara no Shunzei, a famous poet of the time with whom she may have studied, and developed a friendship with his son Teika. Teika was also a renowned poet, and it is speculated that Shikishi and Teika were in a relationship. Much of Shikishi's poetry contains a tone of saddened longing, which has led some to believe she dealt with unrequited or unattainable love. Teika kept a thorough journal, in which he chronicles his visits to Shikishi. He and Shunzei would often visit her together, but Teika does not go into detail about these visits, though his concern for her appears in entries during the time when Shikishi's illness was worsening. A couple of times he wrote that he remained through the night, including a time Shikishi was especially ill and he stayed in “the northern corner of the kitchen”. Scholars disagree about whether or not Shikishi and Teika were lovers, and the evidence is too small to be certain either way. In the 1190s, Shikishi took Buddhist vows to become a nun and adopted the name Shōnyohō, as she had become a believer in Pure Land Buddhism. Also in the 1190s, there were two separate instances of rumors that she had cursed notable women, one of the instances involving a plot against the government; and some believe she took the vows partly to escape punishment. No action was taken regarding either of these accusations, however.

Shikishi was appointed as foster mother in 1200 to the future Emperor Juntoku, and also during this year she wrote a set of one hundred poems for the First Hundred-Poem Sequences of the Shōji Era (正治初度百首, Shōji Ninen Shodo Hyakushu), which was sponsored by her nephew, the retired Emperor Go-Toba. Go-Toba had directed all notable poets in this year to submit some of their works for this anthology, and Shikishi wrote this set of poems in only twenty days despite being extremely ill. Beginning with twenty-five, eventually forty-nine of Shikishi's poems were chosen for the eighth imperial anthology, the Shin Kokin Wakashū (as opposed to only nine of Teika's), which altogether contained 1,979 poems. For the two decades between Shikishi and Teika's first meeting and the former's death, the latter's diary displays some of the ongoing health struggles Shikishi had until her death in 1201.

== Poetry ==
Today 399 of Shikishi's poems are known, many of which are part of three sets: Sequences A, B, and C. The poetry form Shikishi used was called tanka, which involves grouping syllables into a set of 5-7-5-7-7. As this form was rather limited, the most widely used way of experimentation lay in stringing together several sets of these 5-7-5-7-7 lines to make longer poems. Sequences A, B, and C were written in hundred-tanka sequences, called hyakushu-uta, and the rest of her poems are in smaller sets of tanka. Though it is difficult to be certain, Sequence A is thought to have been written sometime between 1169 (perhaps earlier) and 1194. It is believed that Sequence B was written between 1187 and 1194, and it is known for certain that Sequence C, the one she wrote for Go-Toba's poetry collection, was written in 1200 shortly before she died. Sequences A and B both abide by the same subjects and numbers: Spring, 20 poems; Summer, 15 poems; Autumn, 20 poems; Winter, 15 poems; followed by Love, 15 poems; and Miscellany, 15 poems. Sequence C contains the typical set of seasonal poems: 20 for Spring and Autumn, and 15 for Summer and Winter; followed by Love, 10 poems; Travels, 5 poems; Mountain Living, 5 poems; Birds, 5 poems; and Felicitations, 5 poems. The many tanka in a hyakushu-uta each focus on a single component of the greater concept of the poem, coming together to form an interconnected whole. Tanka often made use of the literary technique kakekotoba, a method that involved using homonyms and homophones. For example, one of Shikishi's tanka reads:

春くれば心もとけて泡雪の
あはれふりゆく身をしらぬかな
haru kureba kokoro mo tokete awayuki no
aware furiyuku mi o shiranu ka na
As spring comes my heart melts, and I forget how like the soft snow I go on fading

In this poem, the segment furu of the word furiyuku means “to fall (like snow)” and also “to grow old”. The poem's use of kakekotoba connects the idea of the narrator's heart softening at the season's change to the idea that she is aging. Shikishi also used a device called engo (縁語), or “related word”. Engo involves tying together imagery in a poem by using words that evoke similar ideas. In one poem she writes:

風さむみ木の葉はれゆく夜な夜なに
残るくまなき庭の月影
kaze samumi konoha hareyuku yo na yo na ni
nokoru kuma naki niwa no tsukikage
Wind cold, leaves are cleared from trees night after night, baring the garden to the light of the moon
(Shin Kokin Wakashū 6:605)

Here, the word hare, meaning “cleared”, also connects to the image of the clear light of the moon (tsukikage). Another more content-based technique that appears in Shikishi's writing is honka-dori, the taking of a passage by another poet and incorporating it into one's own work, without acknowledgement. Some may be uncomfortable with this technique, considering its resemblance to plagiarism. However, considering the restrictive structure of tanka, the limited subjects poets were allowed to write on, and the closed-off nature of Kyoto at this time, it is not surprising that different poets’ work would gradually begin to sound similar. Also, within Chinese methods of poetry writing which influenced Japanese poets, including someone else's work within one's own was seen as a tribute paid to another author, not an act of stealing. There are differences in the ways scholars translate Shikishi's poetry:

玉の緒よ絶えなば絶えねながらへば
忍ぶることのよわりもぞする
tama no o yo taenaba taene nagareba
shinoburu koto no yowari mo zo suru
(Shin Kokin Wakashū 11:1034)

Earl Roy Miner's translation	Hiroaki Sato's translation	Joshua Mostow's translation
O cord of life! Threading through the jewel of my soul, If you will break, break now; I shall weaken if this life continues, Unable to bear such fearful strain.	String of beads, if you must break, break; if you last longer, my endurance is sure to weaken	O, jeweled thread of life! if you are to break, then break now! For, if I live on, my ability to hide my love will most surely weaken!

Here are Shikishi's spring poems from Sequence A, translated by Sato.

春もまづしるくみゆるは音羽山
峰の雪より出づる日の色
haru mo mazu shiruku miyuru wa Otowa-yama
mine no yuki yori izuru hi no iro
In spring too what first stands out is Mount Otowa: from the snow at its peak sunrays appear

鶯はまだ声せねど岩そそぐ
垂水の音に春ぞ聞こゆる
uguisu wa mada koe senedo iwa sosogu
tarumi no oto ni haru zo kikoyuru
Though warblers have not called, in the sound of cascades pouring down the rocks spring is heard

色つぼむ梅の木の間の夕月夜
春の光をみせそむるかな
iro tsubomu ume no konoma no yūzukuyo
haru no hikari o misesomuru ka na
Through a bud-tinted plum tree the evening moon begins to show light of spring

見渡せばこのもかのもにかけてけり
まだ緯うすき春の衣を
miwataseba kono mo kano mo ni kaketekeri
mada nuki usuki haru no koromo o
As I look around, now here, now there, it's covered with spring robes, their woof feeble still

あと絶えていくへも霞め深く我が
世をうぢ山の奧の麓に
ato taete ikue mo kasume fukaku waga
yo o Ujiyama no oku no fumoto ni
Isolate my life, seclude it with layers of haze, deeply, at the food of the Hill of Gloom

春ぞかし思ふばかりにうち霞
めぐむ梢ぞながめられける
haru zo kashi omou bakari ni uchi kasumi
megumu kozue zo nagamerarekeru
It's spring: to my heart's content I gaze at the treetops shrouded in haze and budding

消えやらぬ雪に果つるる梅が枝の
初花染めの置くそゆかしき
kieyaranu yuki ni hatsururu umegae no
hatsuhana-zome no oku zo yukashiki
Opening on plum twigs in unfaded snow, the first blossoms for dyeing bring back the past

誰が里の梅の辺りに触れつらむ
移り香知るき人の袖かな
ta ga sato no ume no atari ni furetsuran
utsuri ka shiruki hito no sode ka na
In whose abode did they touch plum blossoms? The scent transferred so distinct on your sleeves

梅の花恋しきことの色ぞ添ふ
うたてにほひの消えぬ衣に
(m)ume no hana koishiki koto no iro zo sou
utate nioi no kienu koromo ni
Plum blossoms accompanied by a tinge of love: their scent on your coat, distinct, unfaded

花はいさそこはかとなく見わたせば
霞ぞかをる春のあけぼの
hana wa isa soko wa katonaku miwataseba
kasumi zo kaoru haru no akebono
About blossoms I do not know; there, not there, I look around: haze fragrant on a spring dawn

花ならでまたなぐさむる方もがな
つれなく散るをつれなくぞ見む
hana narade mata nagusa samuru kata mogana
tsurenaku chiru o tsurenaku zo min
Would there were other means of consolation than flowers: coldly they fall, coldly I watch
(Gyokuyō Wakashū 2:239)

儚くて過ぎにし方を数ふれば
花に物思ふ春ぞ経にける
hakanakute suginishi kata o kazoureba
hana ni mono-omou haru zo henikeru
When I count the seasons past, fleeting, so many springs wistful of flowers I’ve come through
(Shin Kokin Wakashū 2:101)

誰も見よ吉野の山の峰続き
雲ぞ桜よ花ぞ白雪
tare mo miyo Yoshino-no-yama no mine tsuzuki
kumo zo sakura yo hana zo shirayuki
Everyone, look at Yoshino's mountain peaks! Are the clouds cherry, the blossoms white snow?

花咲きし尾上は知らず春霞
千種の色の消ゆる頃かな
hana sakishi onoe wa shirazu harugasumi
chigusa no iro no kiyuru koro ka na
I do not know about hilltops with cherry in bloom; now in spring haze a thousand hues fade

春風やまやの軒端を過ぎぬらむ
ふりつむ雪のかをる手枕
harukaze ya maya no nokiba o suginuran
furitsumu yuki no kaoru tamakura
A spring breeze must have passed the gable eaves: the accumulated snow fragrant where I lie

残り行く有明の月の漏る影に
ほのぼの落つる葉隠れの花
nokori yuku ariake no tsuki no moru kage ni
honobono otsuru hagakure no hana
In the moonlight remaining after daybreak, faintly falling blossoms hidden among leaves

鶯も物憂く春は呉竹の
夜離れにけりな宿も寂しく
uguisu mo monouku haru wa kuretake no
yogarenikeri na yado mo sabishiku
Warblers, too, wearied as spring ends; no more visits at night and my house is desolate

故郷へ今はと向かふ雁が音も
別るる雲の曙の色
furusato e ima wa to mukau karigane mo
wakaruru kumo no akebono no iro
The geese, now heading for home, can't help saying farewell to the clouds aglow at dawn

けふのみと霞の色も立ち別れ
春は入り日の山の端の影
kyō nomi to kasumi no iro mo tachiwakare
haru wa irihi no yama no ha no kage
Today's the last; haze with its hues rises and parts, spring at sunset in the hilltop sky

A few of her other poems, not included in Sequences A, B, or C:

After resigning the vestal’s post at Kamo, on the Day of the Sacred Tree during the festival someone brought her a gift of aoi to offer her. She wrote on it:

神山の麓になれし葵草
引き別れても年ぞへにける
kamiyama no fumoto ni nareshi aoigusa
hikiwakarete mo toshi zo henikeru
At the foot of the god's hills I grew used to aoi; since I parted with it years have passed
(Senzai Wakashū 3:147)

Among the poems on “Love”:

しるらめや心は人に月草の
そめのみまさるおもひありとは
shirurame ya kokoro wa hito ni tsukigusa no
some no mimaseru omoi ari to wa
Does he know: some thoughts, like dayflowers, cling to someone and intensify in color?
(Shokugosen Wakashū 11:648)

いかにせむ岸うつ浪のかけてだに
しられぬ恋に身をくだきつつ
ika ni sen kishi utsu nami no kakete dani
shirarenu koi ni mi o kudakitsutsu
What to do? Like the waves beating on the beach, I, in unknown love, am shattering myself
(Shokugosen Wakashū 11:649)

Among the “Miscellaneous” poems:

筆の跡に過ぎにしことをとどめずは
知らぬ昔にいかであはまし
fude no ato ni suginishi koto o todomezu wa
shiranu mukashi ni ika de awamashi
If no one kept what passes in traces of a brush, how could we meet the unknown past?
(Shokugosen Wakashū 17:1142)

== Recognition ==
Shikishi was recognized in fifteen out of twenty-one imperial anthologies. Fujiwara no Shunzei included nine of Shikishi's works in the Senzai Wakashū, the seventh imperial anthology, containing 1,288 poems. The eighth imperial anthology, the Shin Kokin Wakashū, compiled shortly after her death, included forty-nine of her poems. 155 of her poems are incorporated throughout the seventh imperial anthology to the twenty-first.
