= Shikikenmon'in no Mikushige =

Japanese poet and lady-in-waiting

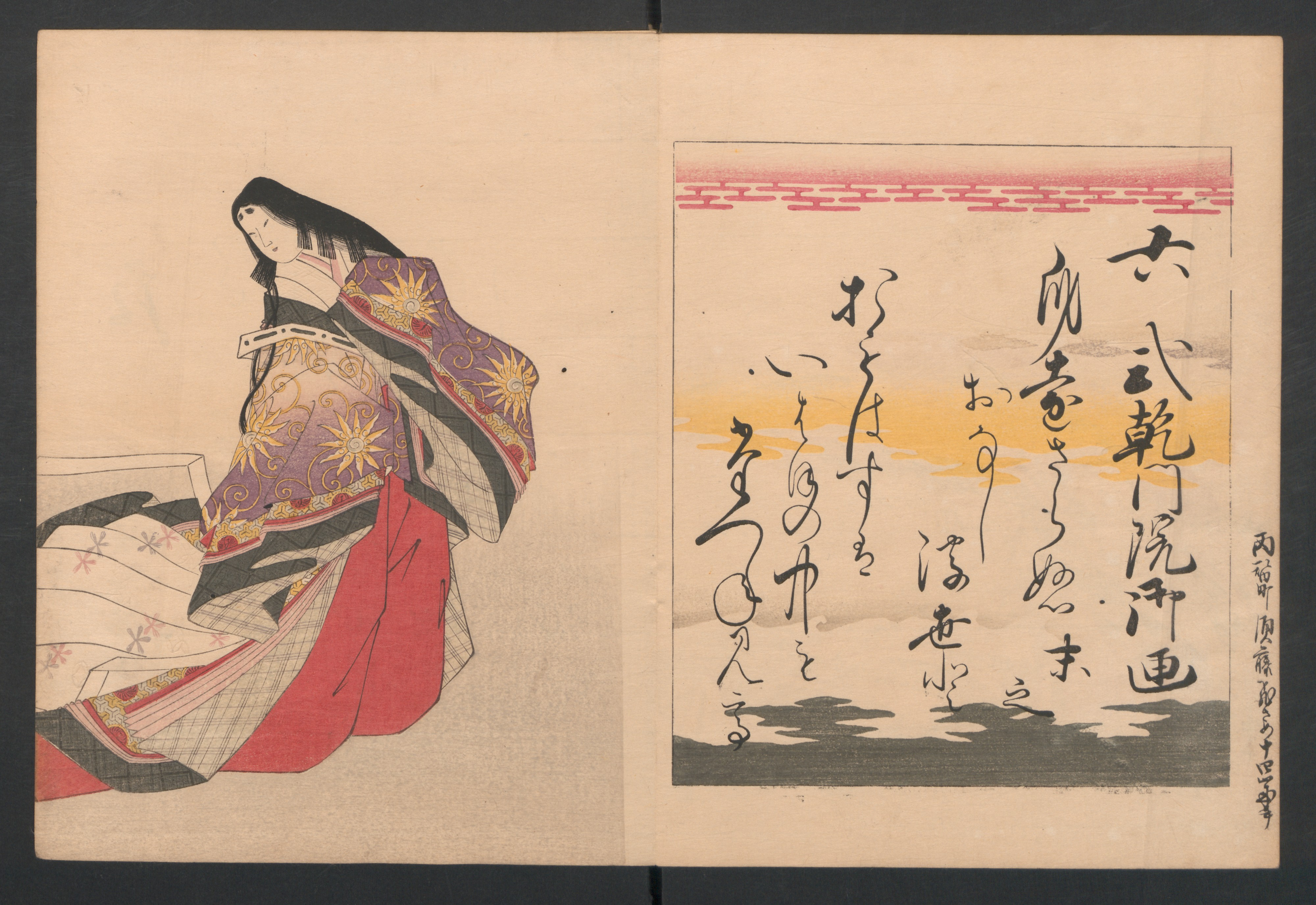
Shikikenmon'in no Mikushige by Chōbunsai Eishi and her poem by a Hanagata Shodo female calligraphy school student, woodblock print, 1801

Shikikenmon-in no Mikushige (式乾門院御匣; 13th century – 1304?), after also known as Ankamon'in Sanjo, was a Japanese poet and lady-in-waiting during the Kamakura period. She is listed as one of the prestigious Thirty-Six Immortal Women Poets of Classical Japan, and is also known by her posthumous Buddhist name of Kisaragi. She is believed to have been a daughter of Grand Minister of State Kuga Michimitsu, and thus may be the same person as a daughter of Michimitsu who is known to have died in 1304.

Lady Nijō, the author and protagonist of the diary Towazugatari, claimed Shikikenmon-in no Mikushige as her aunt, based on the genealogy cited in her diary.

== Biography ==
Shikikenmon-in no Mikushige was born on an unknown date in the early 13th century. She served Imperial Princess Toshiko (Shikikanmon'in) and accompanied her on the Ise procession as saigū in 1228. It is believed that she continued to serve at Kitashirakawa-in even after she retired from her position as saigū. After Princess Toshiko's death in 1251, Shikikenmon-in no Mikushige served her sister, Princess Kuniko (Ankamon'in). She is also known to have had a close relationship with poet and nun Abutsu-ni (Ankamon'in Shijō), who also served Princess Kuniko.

== Work ==
Shikikenmon-in no Mikushige's work appears in the Gyokuyō Wakashū (Collection of Jeweled Leaves), an imperial anthology of Japanese waka poetry compiled by Fujiwara no Tamekane. The collection was completed somewhere between 1313 and 1314, two or three years after the Retired Emperor Fushimi ordered it. Tamekane was the leader of the Kyōgoku branch of the Fujiwara family, which, along with the more junior Reizei branch, advocated for innovation and freedom in poetry, rather than the emphasis on form and tradition preferred by the senior Nijō branch.

From the Gyokuyō Wakashū, Vol. 17, Miscellaneous Poems 4:

従三位為信

けふはいかに涙ふりにし宮のうちも さらに時雨て袖ぬらすらん
返し 式乾門院御匣
涙のみいとゝふりそふ時雨には ほすひまもなき墨染の袖

Translation:

Junior Third Rank Tamenobu
How tears flowed in the palace today, and now the drizzle is wetting my sleeves.
Returns Shikikenmonin's Box

In the drizzle, tears fall like rain, and my ink-dyed sleeves have no time to wash.

The Gyokuyō Wakashū also contains a poem mourning the death of Shikikenmon-in no Mikushige, suggesting she had died before its completion.

== Anecdote ==
Poet and nun Abutsu-ni, a colleague of Shikikenmon-in no Mikushige in the service of Princess Kuniko, arrived in Kamakura in 1279 and frequently exchanged letters with acquaintances in Kyoto. She wrote in her Sixteenth Night Diary:

The one in Shikikenmon'in's Gokasodono Hall is said to be the daughter of the Grand Minister of State of Kuga. She has also been included in numerous collections since the Zokugosen era, and has also been heard in [Imperial] household interviews. Her name is therefore not hidden. She now serves Ankamon'in as a lady-in-waiting.

From this, it is visible that that Shikikenmon-in no Mikushige was seen as an accomplished poet and held in great esteem by her peers.

== Works ==
Anthrology

Wakashū	Author	Poem #	Wakashū	Author	Poem #	Wakashū	Author	Poem #
Shokugosen Wakashū	Shikikenmon'in no Mikushige	2	Shokukokin Wakashū	Shikikenmon'in no Mikushige	7	Shokushūi Wakashū	Shikikenmon'in no Mikushige	10
Shingosen Wakashū	Shikikenmon'in no Mikushige	8	Gyokuyō Wakashū	Shikikenmon'in no Mikushige	3	Shokusenzai Wakashū	Shikikenmon'in no Mikushige	5
Shokugoshūi Wakashū	Shikikenmon'in no Mikushige	3	Fūga Wakashū			Shinsenzai Wakashū	Shikikenmon'in no Mikushige	2
Shinshūi Wakashū	Shikikenmon'in no Mikushige	4	Shingoshūi Wakashū	Shikikenmon'in no Mikushige	1	Shinshokukokin Wakashū	Shikikenmon'in no Mikushige	5

== Other work cited ==
Inoue and Fukuda, Shuichi, Medieval Poetry Collections and Their Research, Vol. 1, September 1968, unpublished Japanese literature materials
