= Jūsandaishū =

The Jūsandaishū (十三代集) are the last thirteen imperial anthologies of Japanese waka poetry. They are:

- Shinchokusen Wakashū
- Shokugosen Wakashū
- Shokukokin Wakashū
- Shokushūi Wakashū
- Shingosen Wakashū
- Gyokuyō Wakashū
- Shokusenzai Wakashū
- Shokugoshūi Wakashū
- Fūga Wakashū
- Shinsenzai Wakashū
- Shinshūi Wakashū
- Shingoshūi Wakashū
- Shinshokukokin Wakashū

== See also ==
- List of Japanese poetry anthologies
