= List of Japanese poetry anthologies =

This is a list of significant Japanese poetry anthologies.

== Waka ==
Starting with the Kokin Wakashū, there were 21 official anthologies, known collectively as the Nijūichidaishū (二十一代集, Collections of the Twenty-One Eras).

=== Nara period (710 to 794) ===
- Man'yōshū: the oldest anthology in Japanese, c.785, 20 manuscript scrolls, 4,516 poems (when the tanka envoys to the various chōka are numbered as separate poems), Ōtomo no Yakamochi was probably the last to edit the Man'yōshū. It is not organized in any particular way (most metadata is supplied by headnotes), and the poems are written in a Japanese version of the Chinese monosyllabic pronunciation for the Chinese characters.

=== Heian period (794 to 1185) ===
- Imperial waka anthologies: anthologies as a national project. Each anthology reflected the taste of time and with loyal dignity became canons for contemporaries and those who followed. The earliest three anthologies are often called Sandaishū, Three Major Anthologies, and earliest eight Hachidaishū, Eight Major Anthologies. Twenty one Imperial anthologies were created: they are collectively known as the Nijūichidaishū.
  1. Kokin Wakashū: the first imperial waka anthology, 20 scrolls, 1,111 poems, ordered by Emperor Daigo and completed c. 905, compiled by Ki no Tsurayuki, Ki no Tomonori, Ōshikōchi no Mitsune and Mibu no Tadamine.
  2. Gosen Wakashū: 20 scrolls, 1,426 poems, ordered in 951 by Emperor Murakami
  3. Shūi Wakashū: 20 scrolls, 1,351 poems, ordered by ex-Emperor Kazan
  4. Goshūi Wakashū: 20 scrolls, 1,220 poems, Ordered in 1075 by Emperor Shirakawa, completed in 1086.
  5. Kin'yō Wakashū: 10 scrolls, 716 poems, ordered by former Emperor Shirakawa, drafts completed 1124–1127, compiled by Minamoto no Shunrai (Toshiyori)
  6. Shika Wakashū: 10 scrolls, 411 poems, ordered in 1144 by former Emperor Sutoku, completed c. 1151–1154, compiled by Fujiwara Akisuke (ja:藤原顕輔)
  7. Senzai Wakashū: 20 scrolls, 1,285 poems, ordered by former Emperor Go-Shirakawa, probably completed in 1188, compiled by Fujiwara no Shunzei (also known as Toshinari)
  8. Shin Kokin Wakashū: 20 scrolls, 1,978 poems, its name apparently aimed to show the relation and counterpart to Kokin Wakashū, ordered in 1201 by former Emperor Go-Toba, compiled by Fujiwara no Teika (whose first name is sometimes romanized as Sadaie), Fujiwara Ariie (ja:藤原有家), Fujiwara no Ietaka (Karyū), the priest Jakuren, Minamoto Michitomo (ja:堀川通具), and Asukai Masatsune

==== Private editions ====
Most waka poets had their own anthologies edited by themselves or by others. Some of these are sources of the imperial anthologies.

- Hitomarokashū: an anthology of Kakinomoto no Hitomaro works. The editor is unknown. Perhaps edited in the early Heian period. Many misattributed waka are included.
- Tsurayukishū: an anthology of Ki no Tsurayuki works, one of editors of Kokin Wakashū.
- Kintōshū: an anthology of Fujiwara no Kintō, the editor of Wakan Rōeishū. It gave influence to the waka poetry in the middle Heian period.
- Hyakunin Isshu, or more precisely Ogura Hyakunin Isshu: edited by Fujiwara no Teika. Till Meiji it had been read as elementary book for waka poets.
- Fujiwara no Teika Kashū: an anthology of Fujiwara no Teika works.
- Izumi Shikibu Shū: an anthology of Izumi Shikibu works.

=== Kamakura period (1185–1333) and Muromachi period (1336–1573) ===
- Imperial anthologies - thirteen anthologies were edited mostly in the Kamakura period.

9. Shinchokusen Wakashū: 20 scrolls, 1,376 poems.
10. Shokugosen Wakashū: 20 scrolls, 1,368 poems.
11. Shokukokin Wakashū: 20 scrolls, 1,925 poems.
12. Shokushūi Wakashū: 20 scrolls, 1,461 poems.
13. Shingosen Wakashū: 20 scrolls, 1,606 poems.
14. Gyokuyō Wakashū: 20 scrolls, 2,796 poems.
15. Shokusenzai Wakashū: 20 scrolls, 2,159 poems.
16. Shokugoshūi Wakashū: 20 scrolls, 1,347 poems.
17. Fūga Wakashū: 20 scrolls, 2,210 poems.
18. Shinsenzai Wakashū: 20 scrolls, 2,364 poems.
19. Shinshūi Wakashū: 20 scrolls, 1,920 poems.
20. Shingoshūi Wakashū: 20 scrolls, 1,554 poems.
21. Shinshokukokin Wakashū: 20 scrolls, 2,144 poems, last Imperial anthology, notable for including nearly 800 poets.

== Renga ==
- Renri Hishō (c. 1349): a treatise on renga poetics by Nijō Yoshimoto
- Tsukubashū (1356): edited by Nijō Yoshimoto. Given the status of imperial anthology after compilation.
- Shinsentsukubashū (1470): edited by Sōgi.

== Haikai and Haiku ==
- Shinseninutsukubashū (1532): edited by Yamazaki Sōkan. The significant anthology of early haikai renga from which haiku later developed.
- Kai Ōi (The Seashell Game) (1672): hokku anthology, compiled by Matsuo Bashō
- Haikai Shichibushū: the conventional name for seven anthologies collecting Matsuo Bashō and his disciples' renku.
  - Fuyunohi (A Winter Day)
  - Harunohi (A Spring Day)
  - Arano (Wilderness)
  - Hisago (Gourd)
  - Sarumino (Monkey's Straw Raincoat)
  - Sumidawara (Carbon Carton)
  - Zokusarumino (Monkey's Straw Raincoat II)

== Kanshi ==
- Kaifūsō (751): the oldest collection of Chinese poetry (kanshi) written by Japanese poets
- Imperial anthologies: advancing the Imperial waka anthologies, the earliest imperial anthologies gathered Kanshi, the Chinese poetry which Japanese learned from the Tang dynasty. Three anthologies were edited in the early Heian period:
  1. Ryōunshū
  2. Bunka Shūreishū
  3. Keikokushū

== Miscellaneous ==
- Wakan rōeishū: a collection of waka and kanshi for reciting. Compiled by Fujiwara no Kintō.
- Shin'yō Wakashū: compiled by Munenaga Shinnō ca. 1381 and commissioned by Emperor Chōkei, not included in the Nijūichidaishū for political reasons.

== See also ==
- Fūyō Wakashū, late 13th century, sponsorship uncertain
- List of Japanese language poets
- List of Japanese classic texts
- Japanese poetry
- List of poetry anthologies
- List of National Treasures of Japan (writings)
