= Aishōka =

Category of Waka poetry

Aishōka (哀傷歌) is a category of waka poetry. Loosely translated, it refers to "laments", but the precise meaning varied over the centuries. Originally it appears to have referred specifically to laments for the dead, but later came to include Buddhist poems on impermanence and even some love poems.

== Overview ==
Aishōka is a category of waka (poems in classical Japanese) based on the content of the poems. It is most frequently used in reference to bu-date, division of waka anthologies into thematic books. Aishōka most typically are poems of personal reminiscence and lament.

In the 8th-century Man'yōshū poems of this type were categorized as banka (elegies). The 9th-century Bunka Shūreishū (an anthology of poems in classical Chinese) used the word aishō (哀傷). Many of the imperial collections include books of aishōka, including the Kokin Wakashū, the Gosen Wakashū, the Shūi Wakashū, the Goshūi Wakashū, the Senzai Wakashū, the Shinkokin Wakashū, the Shokukokin Wakashū, the Shokusenzai Wakashū, the Shokugoshūi Wakashū, the Shinsenzai Wakashū, the Shinshūi Wakashū and the Shinshokukokin Wakashū.

The word aishō was already in use in the Man'yōshū to describe the themes of several poems. With the exception of one poem describing a banishment, all were laments for the dead. In the Kokin Wakashū, the term refers to poems written about the death of a friend or a relative, but by the time of the later Shūi Wakashū it had come to cover poems about the impermanence of things and such poems expounding specifically Buddhist principles. This shift in usage continued in later collections, and by the time of the Shinkokin Wakashū the category included a very large number of poems on impermanence.

In the Shūishō, the term was used to describe six poems at the end of the book of love poetry.

The precise meaning and boundaries of what constitute an aishōka are not certain and seem to have fluctuated, specifically grown broader, over time.

== Works cited ==
- Komachiya, Teruhiko (1983). "Aishōka". Nihon Koten Bungaku Daijiten 日本古典文学大辞典 (in Japanese). Vol. 1. Tokyo: Iwanami Shoten. p. 4. OCLC 11917421.
