= Nijō Tameakira =

Japanese courtier and waka poet (1295–1364)

Nijō Tameakira (二条為明, 1295–1364), also known as Fujiwara no Tameakira (藤原為定), was a Japanese courtier and waka poet of the late Kamakura period and Nanbokuchō period.

He was tied to Emperor Go-Daigo early in the latter's conflict with the Kamakura shogunate and was exiled to Shikoku, but returned to the capital during the Kenmu Restoration.

Later in his life, he was closely linked with the second Muromachi shōgun, Ashikaga Yoshiakira, and was assigned to the compilation of the Shinshūi Wakashū, the nineteenth imperial anthology of waka poetry, but died before it could be completed.

== Biography ==
=== Birth and ancestry ===
Nijō Tameakira was born in 1295. His father was Nijō Tamefuji.

Tamefuji was a son of Nijō Tameyo, Tameyo himself being a son of Nijō Tameuji, a grandson of Fujiwara no Tameie, and a great-grandson of Fujiwara no Teika.

=== Political career ===
He was closely associated with Emperor Go-Daigo, and throughout the 1320s, until around 1332, he participated in many poetry gatherings at both court and the residences of various nobles. He rose to the positions of Middle Captain of the Left (左中将) and 右兵衛督.

He was implicated in the plot to overthrow the Hōjō regents, captured in Rokuhara, and exiled to Tosa Province. Book 2 of the Taiheiki reports that it was at the time of his Rokuhara capture that he composed his poem omoi-ki ya / wa ga shikishima no / michi nara-de / ukiyo no koto o / towaru-beshi to wa (思ひきやわが敷島の道ならでうき世のことを問はるべしとは).

He returned to the capital during the Kenmu Restoration.

In 1359, he was awarded the position of Acting Middle Counselor (gon-chūnagon). The following year, he attained the Senior Third Rank.

=== Death ===
He died on the 27th day of the tenth month of Jōji 3 (1364).

== Name ==
He was a member of the Nijō branch of the Fujiwara clan, so is known as both Nijō Tameakira and Fujiwara no Tameakira.

== Poetry ==
In 1344, he took part in the Kōya-san Kongō-zanmai-in Tanzaku (高野山金剛三昧院短冊), and also presented his Jōwa Hyakushu (貞和百首) and Enbun Hyakushu (延文百首) to the court.

With the death of his cousin Nijō Tamesada in 1360, he became the central figure of the waka circle surrounding the shōgun Ashikaga Yoshiakira. In 1363, on Yoshiakira's request he was assigned to the compilation of the Shinshūi Wakashū, but died the following year before his work was completed.

== Works cited ==
- "Nijō Tameyo" 二条為世. Bijutsu Jinmei Jiten (in Japanese). Shibunkaku. 2016.
- Hosoya, Naoki (1983). "Nijō Tameakira". Nihon Koten Bungaku Daijiten 日本古典文学大辞典 (in Japanese). Vol. 4. Tokyo: Iwanami Shoten. p. 595. OCLC 11917421.
- Hosoya, Naoki (1983). "Nijō Tamefuji". Nihon Koten Bungaku Daijiten 日本古典文学大辞典 (in Japanese). Vol. 4. Tokyo: Iwanami Shoten. p. 596. OCLC 11917421.
- Inoue, Muneo (1994). "Fujiwara no Tameyo" 二条為世. Encyclopedia Nipponica (in Japanese). Shogakukan.
