= Nijō Tamefuji =

Japanese courtier and waka poet (1275–1324)

Nijō Tamefuji (二条為藤, 1275–1324), also known as Fujiwara no Tamefuji (藤原為藤), was a Japanese courtier and waka poet of the late Kamakura period.

== Biography ==
Nijō Tamefuji was born in 1275. He was the second son of Nijō Tameyo, and his mother was a daughter of Kamo Ujihisa (賀茂氏久), Tameyo himself being a son of Nijō Tameuji, a grandson of Fujiwara no Tameie, and a great-grandson of Fujiwara no Teika. He was a member of the Nijō branch of the Fujiwara clan, so is known as both Nijō Tamefuji and Fujiwara no Tamefuji.

He was initially raised by his uncle Nijō Tameo (二条為雄), but following the death of his brother Tamemichi in the fifth month he returned to his father's household.

On the eleventh day of the sixth month of 1302 he participated in an uta-awase, and the following year took part in the Go-Nijō-in uta-awase. He was also included in the Kagen sentō on-hyaku-shu (嘉元仙洞御百首) and the Bunpō on-hyaku-shu (文保御百首). In 1317 he was awarded the position of Acting Middle Counselor (gon-chūnagon).

When Emperor Go-Daigo, with whom he had worked closely, succeeded to the Chrysanthemum Throne, his position in poetic circles continued to grow in importance. On the second day of the seventh month of Genkō 3 (1323), he was selected as the compiler of the Shokugoshūi Wakashū. Five days later, he took part in the Kameyama-dono shichihyaku-shu (亀山殿七百首), to which he contributed 68 poems (third after Retired Emperor Go-Uda and his father Tameyo). In the second month of the following year, he wrote the Iwashimizu-sha uta-awase (石清水社歌合). Soon thereafter he abandoned work on the Shokugoshūi Wakashū with it still incomplete.

116 of his poems are included in imperial collections from the Shingosen Wakashū on. Several of his poems are also known from private collections (私撰集 shisenshū), such as the Shoku Gen'yō Wakashū (続現葉和歌集) and the Tōyō Wakashū (藤葉和歌集).

He died on the seventeenth day of the seventh month of Genkō 4 (1324).

== Works cited ==
- "Nijō Tameyo" 二条為世. Bijutsu Jinmei Jiten (in Japanese). Shibunkaku. 2016.
- Hosoya, Naoki (1983). "Nijō Tamefuji". Nihon Koten Bungaku Daijiten 日本古典文学大辞典 (in Japanese). Vol. 4. Tokyo: Iwanami Shoten. p. 596. OCLC 11917421.
- Inoue, Muneo (1994). "Fujiwara no Tameyo" 二条為世. Encyclopedia Nipponica (in Japanese). Shogakukan.
