= Nijō poetic school =

The Nijō poetic school (二条, Nijō) refers to descendants of Fujiwara no Tameie's eldest son, Nijō Tameuji (1222–86). The family name took after Nijō district of Kyoto where the family had resided. This hereditary house of Japanese waka poetry is generally known for its conservative slant toward the politics and poetics aimed at preserving the ideals of Fujiwara no Shunzei and Fujiwara no Teika. The members of the family are credited for the compilation of eleven out of thirteen later imperial anthologies, i.e., Jūsandaishū (十三代集) :

- Shinchokusen Wakashū (新勅撰和歌集);
- Shokugosen Wakashū (続後撰和歌集);
- Shokukokin Wakashū (続古今和歌集);
- Shokushūi Wakashū (続拾遺和歌集);
- Shingosen Wakashū (新後撰和歌集);
- Shokusenzai Wakashū (続千載和歌集);
- Shokugoshūi Wakashū (続後拾遺和歌集);
- Shinsenzai Wakashū (新千載和歌集);
- Shinshūi Wakashū (新拾遺和歌集);
- Shingoshūi Wakashū (新後拾遺和歌集), and
- Shinshokukokin Wakashū (新続古今和歌集).

(listed in chronological order)

The rivals of Nijō school, the Kyōgoku and Reizei families are known for their innovative approach to poetic composition. The Kyōgoku family compiled the following two imperial anthologies:

- Gyokuyō Wakashū (玉葉和歌集) and
- Fūga Wakashū (風雅和歌集).
