= Ni-jū-hachi Hon Narabi ni Ku Hon Shiika =

Japanese poetry anthology

The Ni-jū-hachi Hon Narabi ni Ku Hon Shiika (二十八品并九品詩歌) is a Japanese anthology of both kanshi (poetry in Classical Chinese) and waka (poetry in Classical Japanese) on Buddhist themes. The collection was likely compiled by Fujiwara no Tameie in 1253, to mark the twelfth anniversary of the death of his father Fujiwara no Teika. The kanshi were composed by twelve poets, and the waka by thirteen, more than half being members of the Fujiwara clan, including Tameie himself and his son Tameuji. The text survives in three manuscripts.

== Genre ==
The Ni-jū-hachi Hon Narabi ni Ku Hon Shiika is an anthology of both Classical Chinese poetry (kanshi ) by Japanese authors and Classical Japanese poetry (waka). The poems are all on Buddhist themes.

== Compiler and date ==
The identity of the Ni-jū-hachi Hon Narabi ni Ku Hon Shiika's compiler is uncertain, but in his article on the collection for the Nihon Koten Bungaku Daijiten, Tsuneo Satō (佐藤恒雄) gave Fujiwara no Tameie as a possibility. The anthology dates to Kenchō 5 (1253).

== Contents ==
The kanshi in the Ni-jū-hachi Hon Narabi ni Ku Hon Shiika were composed by twelve men:

1. Fujiwara no Tsunemitsu
2. Fujiwara no Tsunenori (藤原経範)
3. Sugawara no Kimiyoshi (菅原公良)
4. Sugawara no Yoshiyori (菅原良頼)
5. Jakkū (寂空, secular name Fujiwara no Takahira, 藤原隆衡)
6. Sugawara no Naganari (菅原長成)
7. Jōkū (浄空)
8. Hino Mitsukuni
9. Hino Toshikuni (日野俊国, also called Fujiwara no Toshikuni, 藤原俊国)
10. Sugawara no Ariaki (菅原在章)
11. Fujiwara no Shigenori (藤原茂範)
12. Minamoto no Masatomo (源雅具)

The waka were composed by thirteen people:

1. Fujiwara no Ieyoshi
2. Fujiwara no Tameie
3. Fujiwara no Tameuji
4. Fujiwara no Tomoie (under his Dharma name Renshō, 蓮性)
5. Minamoto no Tomochika (under his Dharma name Nyoshun, 如舜)
6. Fujiwara no Yukiyoshi (under his Dharma name Jakunō, 寂能)
7. Fujiwara no Mitsutoshi (under his Dharma name Shinkan, 真観)
8. Fujiwara no Nobuzane (under his Dharma name Jakusei, 寂西)
9. Fujiwara no Yukiie (藤原行家)
10. Hafuribe no Narishige (祝部成茂)
11. Kozaishō
12. Fujiwara no Takasuke
13. Fujiwara no Motoyoshi (under his Dharma name Enkū, 縁空)

== History ==
The Ni-jū-hachi Hon Narabi ni Ku Hon Shiika likely came about when, on the twelfth anniversary of the death of Fujiwara no Teika, the twentieth day of the eighth month of 1253, Tameie (Teika's heir) commissioned Buddhist poems from the 25 people listed above.

== Textual tradition ==
Three manuscripts of the Ni-jū-hachi Hon Narabi ni Ku Hon Shiika are known to survive. There is a manuscript traditionally attributed to Nijō Tamesada in the possession of the Institute of Oriental Classics at Keio University, from which another manuscript in the holdings of the Ikeda Family Archives (池田家文庫 Ikeda-ke bunko) in Okayama University was copied. The Matsudaira Archives in Shimabara, Nagasaki contain another manuscript from a different textual line.

== Works cited ==
- Satō, Tsuneo (1983). "Ni-jū-hachi Hon Narabi ni Ku Hon Shiika". Nihon Koten Bungaku Daijiten 日本古典文学大辞典 (in Japanese). Vol. 4. Tokyo: Iwanami Shoten. p. 594. OCLC 11917421.
