= Interpretation of the title of the Man'yōshū =

The meaning of the title of the Man'yōshū, an eighth-century Japanese anthology of waka poetry, has been the subject of speculation and debate. The characters literally mean "ten thousand — leaves — collection", but more likely refer to a collection of a great many poems, or a collection to last for a very long time.

== Overview ==
The literal translation of the kanji that make up the title Man'yōshū (万 — 葉 — 集) is "ten thousand — leaves — collection".

The principal interpretations, according to the twentieth-century scholar Sen'ichi Hisamatsu, are (i) a book that collects a great many poems, (ii) a book for all generations, and (iii) a poetry collection that uses a large volume of paper.

Of these, supporters of (i) can be further divided into (a) those who interpret the middle character as "words" (koto no ha, lit. "leaves of speech"), thus giving "ten thousand words", i.e. "many waka", including Sengaku, Shimokōbe Chōryū, Kada no Azumamaro and Kamo no Mabuchi, and (b) those who interpret the middle character as literally referring to leaves of a tree, but as a metaphor for poems, including Ueda Akinari, Kimura Masakoto, Masayuki Okada (岡田正之), Torao Suzuki, Kiyotaka Hoshikawa and Susumu Nakanishi.

Furthermore, (ii) can be divided into: (a) it was meant to express the intention that the work should last for all time (proposed by Keichū, (Note: Keichū also recognized (i) as a possibility.) and supported by Kamochi Masazumi, Inoue Michiyasu, Yoshio Yamada, Noriyuki Kojima and Tadashi Ōkubo); (b) it was meant to wish for long life for the emperor and empress (Shinobu Origuchi); and (c) it was meant to indicate that the collection included poems from all ages (proposed by Yamada).

(iii) was proposed by Yūkichi Takeda in his Man'yōshū Shinkai jō (萬葉集新解上), but Takeda also accepted (ii); his theory that the title refers to the large volume of paper used in the collection has also not gained much traction among other scholars.

== Keichū ==
The reason for this ambiguity was elaborated on (with reference to classical Chinese sources) by Keichū in his work Man'yō Daishōki (萬葉代匠記):

The character yō has two meanings: the first, meaning an era, as in Mao Chang's commentary ... the second, meaning a poem, as in the Shiming (Note: 人聲曰歌，歌，柯也，...如草木之有柯葉也。) ... We cannot know the true intentions of the compiler, but the latter meaning has been held to by subsequent generations.

In a later edition of the same work, Keichū repeated the above dual explanation, further interpreting the meaning of "poem" as an elaboration on the meaning "word" (as in koto no ha), and speculating that the titles of the later Kin'yōshū, Gyokuyōshū and Shin'yōshū as utilizing this meaning. He suggested that the title might be meant to express a desire that this collection would last for all time, comparing the title of the later Senzaishū. He appears to have shown more support for (ii), but was not certain. No other early Edo period scholar cited as many Chinese precedents in support of their interpretation as did Keichū.

== Modern scholars ==
Yoshio Yamada, in his work "Man'yōshū Meigi Kō" (萬葉集名義考) advanced the "ten thousand ages" hypothesis believing it to be the stronger, but the Chinese literature scholar Masayuki Okada in his 1929 work Ōmi-Nara-chō no Kan-bungaku (近江奈良朝の漢文学) preferred the "ten thousand poems" interpretation, based on the titles of other works of the period comparing poems to trees or leaves in a forest (詩林 shirin, 歌林 karin).

Torao Suzuki, another Chinese scholar, followed Okada in his paper "Man'yōshū Shomei no Igi" (万葉集書名の意義, 1951, published in the first volume of the journal Man'yō), noting particularly the title of the (now lost) work Ruijū Karin (類聚歌林). Suzuki took the "leaves" of the title to be the leaves covering the trees in a forest of poetry (karin). Another Sinologist, Kiyotaka Hoshikawa, went further in his 1952 paper "Man'yō Meigi Ronkō" (万葉名義論考, published in the 29th volume of Kokugo to Kokubungaku), citing a Tang-era Chinese work that actually used the phrase man'yō (wànyè in modern Mandarin) in this sense. (Note: 學海千尋詞林萬葉) Following the work of these Chinese scholars, the "ten thousand poems" hypothesis became more widely accepted.

Susumu Nakanishi, in his 1963 book Man'yōshū no Hikakubungakuteki Kenkyū (万葉集の比較文学的研究), also expressed support for the idea that the title referred to the great number of poems included in the work.

Noriyuki Kojima, in the second volume of his 1964 book Jōdai Nihon Bungaku to Chūgoku Bungaku (上代日本文学と中国文学), sided with the "ten thousand ages" hypothesis, though, gathering all the Chinese sources he could find for both sides and weighing them against each other. Kojima determined that while the majority of the textual references in Chinese sources favoured the "ten thousand ages" interpretation, this evidence was not strong enough to base one's view purely on the surviving Chinese sources; he instead concluded that "ten thousand ages" was the better interpretation based on the more likely reasoning of the compiler(s): that they intended for the collection to last for all time. He cited Chinese sources such as the Wen Xuan and the Wenguan Cilin that use the character 葉 in the sense of "age", as well as texts that use it to mean "leaf", in the same contexts where literature is compared to forests and flowers.

In his 1972 book Man'yōshū Seiritsu Kō (万葉集成立考), Matsuo Itami (伊丹末雄) suggested that the title was provided by Tachibana no Moroe, one of the compilers, to mean "ten thousand ages", and cited in support of this a passage about Moroe in the Shoku Nihongi that reads "ten thousand years immortal, one thousand leaves inheritance" (万歳無窮、千葉相伝).

== Works cited ==
- Hisamatsu, Sen'ichi (1973). "Man'yōshū no Meigi". In Sen'ichi Hisamatsu (ed.). Man'yō Kōza (I). Tokyo: Yūseidō. pp. 16–27.
