= Nijō Tameyo =

Japanese courtier and waka poet (1250–1338)

Nijō Tameyo (二条為世, 1250–1338), also known as Fujiwara no Tameyo (藤原為世), was a Japanese courtier and waka poet of the late Kamakura period and the early Nanboku-chō period. His Dharma name was Myōshaku (明釈).

== Biography ==
=== Ancestry, birth and early life ===
Nijō Tameyo was born in 1250. His father was Fujiwara no Tameuji, and his mother was a daughter of Asukai Norisada. He was Tameuji's eldest son, a grandson of Fujiwara no Tameie, and a great-grandson of Fujiwara no Teika.

=== Political career ===
He was a supporter of the Daikakuji line, descendants of Emperor Kameyama, in the succession disputes of the late Kamakura period. At the height of his political career, he had attained the Senior Second Rank, and held the position of Provisional Major Counselor (gon-dainagon).

=== Later life and death ===
He entered Buddhist orders in 1329, acquiring the Dharma name Myōshaku. He died on 18 September 1338, or the fifth day of the eighth month of Engen 3 by Southern Court reckoning, Ryakuō 1 by Northern Court reckoning.

== Poetry ==
Tameyo learned waka composition from his father Tameuji and his grandfather Tameie, who between them had compiled four of the imperial anthologies.

In 1303, on the command of Retired Emperor Go-Uda, Tameyo compiled the Shin Gosen Wakashū. In 1320, also under the direction of Retired Emperor Go-Uda, he compiled the Shoku Senzai Wakashū.

As a result of the accession of Emperor Hanazono, a member of the rival Jimyō-in line, to the throne in 1308, he had a bitter dispute with his cousin Kyōgoku Tamekane over the compilation of the next imperial anthology, a dispute he lost. He attacked Tamekane in his Enkei Ryōkyō Sochin-jō.

He was also known as a teacher of waka composition, and his students included the so-called "Four Heavenly Kings of Waka": Jōben (浄弁), Kenkō, Ton'a and Keiun (慶運).

He produced a privately-compiled anthology, the Shoku Gen'yō-shū (続現葉集), and produced the poetic theory book Waka Teikin (和歌庭訓). He left a personal anthology, the Tameyo-shū.

177 of his poems are included in imperial collections from the Shoku Shūi Wakashū on.

He was also a composer of renga, and some of his work was included in the Tsukuba-shū.

== Works cited ==
- "Nijō Tameyo" 二条為世. Bijutsu Jinmei Jiten (in Japanese). Shibunkaku. 2016.
- "Nijō Tameyo" 二条為世. Britannica Kokusai Dai-Hyakkajiten (in Japanese). Encyclopædia Britannica, Inc. 2014.
- Inoue, Muneo (1994). "Fujiwara no Tameyo" 二条為世. Encyclopedia Nipponica (in Japanese). Shogakukan.
- Misumi, Yōichi (1994). "Nijō Tameyo" 二条為世. Asahi Nihon Rekishi Jinbutsu Jiten (in Japanese). Asahi Shinbun-sha.
- Keene, Donald (1999) [1993]. A History of Japanese Literature, Vol. 1: Seeds in the Heart – Japanese Literature from Earliest Times to the Late Sixteenth Century (paperback ed.). New York, NY: Columbia University Press. ISBN 978-0-231-11441-7.
- "Nijō Tameyo" 二条為世. Mypaedia (in Japanese). Hitachi. 1996.
