= Chikakiyo's fifth daughter =

Unidentified poet of the Kamakura period

Taira no Chikakiyo's fifth daughter (平親清五女, Taira no Chikakiyo no gojo) was a Japanese waka poet of the Kamakura period.

== Biography ==
The Kamakura-period waka poet conventionally known in Japanese as Taira no Chikakiyo no gojo was the daughter of Taira no Chikakiyo and Saneki's mother. This "name" translates to "Taira no Chikakiyo's fifth daughter", and her personal name is unknown.

She was the full sibling of Chikakiyo's fourth daughter. Her relationship (and that of the aforementioned fourth daughter) to the "Chikakiyo's daughter" (平親清女, Taira no Chikakiyo no musume), whose poems appear in the Shoku-Kokin Wakashū and later imperial anthologies, and "Chikakiyo's daughter's younger sister" (平親清女妹, Taira no Chikakiyo no musume no imōto), whose poems appear in the Shoku-Shūi Wakashū and later anthologies, is unknown. At some point she was on Mount Mino (美濃の御山, Mino no oyama). After entering religious orders she lived deep in Higashiyama.

Both her birth and death dates are unknown.

== Poetry ==
The Archives and Mausolea Department of the Imperial Household Agency has two books known as the Taira no Chikakiyo no Gojo Shū (平親清五女集, Taira no Chikakiyo' Fifth Daughter Anthology) comprising 403 poems and 270 poems respectively. The ordering of the poems differs between the two collections, and each contains poems the other does not. These anthologies show she exchanged poetry with her mother, elder sister and niece ("Chikatoki's daughter" (親時女, Chikatoki no musume). As well as organizing poetic gatherings (utakai) on set topics, she composed elegies for 持明院の女院 (Dowager Empress of Jimyōin), 花山院入道前右大臣 (Former Minister of the Right, Nyudo Kazanin), 花山院左大将 (Hanazono-in Left General), and others. She also had poems commissioned by the daughter of "the lord of Kōmyōbu-ji manor" (Kujō Michiie).
