= Hachidaishū =

The Hachidaishū (八代集) are the first eight imperial anthologies of Japanese waka poetry, of which the first three collections are the Sandaishū. The Sandaishū provided both the language and organizational principles for the rest of the anthologies thereafter. They are:

- Kokin Wakashū
- Gosen Wakashū
- Shūi Wakashū
- Goshūi Wakashū
- Kin'yō Wakashū
- Shika Wakashū
- Senzai Wakashū
- Shin Kokin Wakashū
