= Kenchū Mikkan =

Kenchū Mikkan (顕註密勘) is a commentary on the Kokin Wakashū, a 10th-century waka anthology, attributed to the poet-monk Kenshō but compiled and appended after Kenshō's death by the poet and scholar Fujiwara no Teika.

== Overview ==
Kenchū Mikkan includes a note by its compiler, the Kamakura-period waka poet Fujiwara no Teika, that it was completed on the 28th day of the third month of Jōkyū 3 (1221). (Note: Some manuscripts say the 21st day of the third month of Jōkyū 3.'"`UNIQ--ref-00000002-QINU`"') It is a commentary on the Kokin Wakashū, in three kan (books or scrolls). It is a compilation of comments made by the poet-monk Kenshō (ja), who died around 1210.)

== Title ==
The work is normally known by the title Kenchū Mikkan, but it has a large number of alternate titles, including:

- Kokin Wakashū Shō (古今和歌集抄, also written 古今倭歌集抄)
- Kokin Hichū Shō (古今秘註抄)
- Kenchū Mikkan-shō (顕註密勘抄)

Its title is also abbreviated to Kenchū (顕註), Mikkan (密勘), or simply Kan (勘).

== Works cited ==
- Katō, Mutsumi (1994). "Kenshō" 顕昭. Asahi Nihon Rekishi Jinbutsu Jiten (in Japanese). Asahi Shinbun-sha.
- Eizō, Arai (1983). "Kenchū Mikkan". Nihon Koten Bungaku Daijiten 日本古典文学大辞典 (in Japanese). Vol. 2. Tokyo: Iwanami Shoten. pp. 452–453. OCLC 11917421.
