= Nijō =

Nijō can refer to:

== Places ==
- Nijō Street (二条通, Nijō-dori, "second street"), one of numbered east–west streets in the ancient capital of Heian-kyō (present-day Kyoto, Japan)
  - Nijō Castle, a castle in Nakagyō-ku, Kyoto
  - Nijō Station (Kyoto), a train station in Nakagyō-ku, Kyoto
- Nijō, Fukuoka (二丈町, Nijō-machi), a former town in Fukuoka Prefecture, Japan

== People ==
- Emperor Nijō (1143–1165), 78th emperor of Japan
- Nijō family, one of the five regent houses (go-sekke)
- Nijō Tameuji (1222–1286), also known as Fujiwara no Tameuji, poet and founder of:
  - Nijō poetic school, a conservative school of Japanese waka (poetry)
- Lady Nijō (1258–c. 1307), Japanese writer, author of The Confessions of Lady Nijo
