= Utsunomiya Yoritsuna =

Japanese samurai and poet

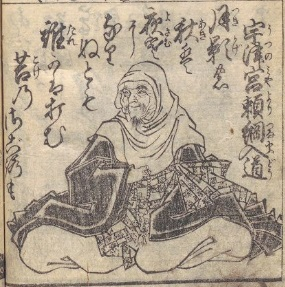
Utsunomiya Yoritsuna by Utagawa Sadahide

Utsunomiya Yoritsuna (宇都宮頼綱) was a Japanese samurai and waka poet of the early Kamakura period.

== Family ==
His father was Utsunomiya Naritsuna (宇都宮成綱). He married a daughter of Hōjō Tokimasa.

After entering Buddhist orders, he took the name Renshō (蓮生), and was also known as Ogura Nyūdō (小倉入道; "the monk of Ogura").

== Poetry ==
He was a close friend of Fujiwara no Teika and his daughter married Teika's son Tameie. He is also said to have commissioned Teika's compilation of the Ogura Hyakunin Isshu. The collection was originally prepared (in a slightly different form to the present Ogura Hyakunin Isshu) to decorate screens (屏風歌, byōbu-uta; "screen-poems") in Yoritsuna's Mt. Ogura residence in the Saga district of Kyoto.

He was the head of one of the chief poetic houses of the Kamakura period.

== Bibliography ==
- Keene, Donald (1999). A History of Japanese Literature, Vol. 1: Seeds in the Heart — Japanese Literature from Earliest Times to the Late Sixteenth Century. New York: Columbia University Press. ISBN 978-0-231-11441-7.
- McMillan, Peter (2010). One Hundred Poets, One Poem Each. New York: Columbia University Press. ISBN 978-0-231-14399-8.
- Suzuki, Hideo; Yamaguchi, Shin'ichi; Yoda, Yasushi (2009). Genshoku: Ogura Hyakunin Isshu. Tokyo: Bun'eidō. ISBN 978-4-578-10082-9.
