= Reizei =

Reizei can refer to:

- Emperor Reizei, emperor of Japan
- Reizei family, a branch of the Fujiwara family
