= Mō hitotsu no chūseizō =

1991 book by Barbara Ruch

Mō hitotsu no chūseizō: Bikuni, otogi-zōshi, raise
- Author: Barbara Ruch
- Original title: もう一つの中世像: 比丘尼・御伽草子・来世
- Language: Japanese
- Publisher: Shinbukaku Publishing
- Publication date: 1991

Mō hitotsu no chūseizō: Bikuni, otogi-zōshi, raise (Japanese: もう一つの中世像: 比丘尼・御伽草子・来世) is a non-fiction book by academic Barbara Ruch. It was published in Japanese in 1991 by Shinbukaku Publishing. The book consists of eight essays, each about the Kamakura and Muromachi periods. These essays discuss the nuns Mugai, Abutsu, and Lady Nijō, and about Japanese literary concepts such as etoki and nara-ehon.

In 1992, the book won the Aoyama Nao Prize for Women's History. In 1999, Ruch won the Yamagata Bantō Award due to the book.
