= Travelers of a Hundred Ages =

Book by Donald Keene

Travelers of a Hundred Ages: The Japanese as Revealed Through 1,000 Years of Diaries
- First edition
- Author: Donald Keene
- Language: English
- Subject: Japanese diaries and literature
- Genre: Academic
- Publisher: Henry Holt and Company, Inc.
- Publication date: 1989
- Publication place: USA
- Media type: Trade paperback
- Pages: 468 (1st edition; including index)
- ISBN: 0-8050-0751-2 (1999 Columbia University Press edition: ISBN 0-231-11437-0)
- OCLC: 18835736
- Dewey Decimal: 895.6/803 19
- LC Class: PL741.1 .K44 1989

Travelers of a Hundred Ages is a nonfiction work on the literary form of Japanese diaries by Donald Keene, who writes in his Introduction that he was introduced to Japanese diaries during his work as a translator for the United States in World War II when he was assigned to translate captured diaries of soldiers; he found them moving enough that he continued to study that genre. Keene's book takes the form of self-contained long chapters (originally published as independent essays in Japanese in Asahi Shimbun) that deal with a single diary, each of which is valuable in its own right as a literary work This treatment is especially apparent when Keene writes of Matsuo Bashō's travel diaries, such as The Narrow Road to the North, or provides a window into an author's life, such as in the case of Fujiwara no Teika's Meigetsuki ("Chronicle of the Clear Moon").

There are variant versions of Travelers of a Hundred Ages; the original English version published by Henry Holt deals with diaries between the 850s CE and up to c. 1850, while the Japanese version has a continuation that brings the time span up to c. 1925, in addition to certain chapters that were omitted from the Holt edition "because it seemed unlikely that they would interest readers outside Japan". An expanded edition was later published by Columbia University Press in 1999.

Thematically, the essays are grouped by historical period. Names are given Japanese-style, family name first.

== Contents ==
=== "Heian Diaries" ===
- The Record of a Pilgrimage to China in Search of the Buddhist Law, by Ennin
- The Tosa Diary, by Ki no Tsurayuki
- The Gossamer Years, by "the mother of Michitsuna" or Michitsuna no Haha
- The Master of the Hut, by Zōki (増基)
- The Izumi Shikibu Diary, by Izumi Shikibu
- The Murasaki Shikibu Diary, by Murasaki Shikibu
- The Sarashina Diary, by the daughter of Takasue
- The Tale of the Tonomine Captain or the Takamitsu Diary, by Fujiwara no Takamitsu
- The Collection of the Mother of Jojin, the Ajari, by ?
- The Sanuki no Suke Diary, by Fujiwara no Nagako
- Chuyuki, by Fujiwara no Munetada
- Poetry Collections and Poem Tales, by Shijonomiya no Shimotsuke
- The Poetic Memoirs of Lady Daibu, by Lady Daibu

=== Diaries of the Kamakura Period ===
- Chronicle of the Bright Moon, by Fujiwara no Teika
- The Diary of Minamoto Ienaga, by Minamoto Ienaga
- The Visit of the Emperor Takakura to Itsukushima, by Minamoto no Michichika
- The Ascension to Heaven of the Late Emperor Takakura, by Minamoto no Michichika
- Journey Along the Seacoast Road, by anonymous
- The Diary of the Priest Shunjo, by Shunjo
- A Journey East of the Barrier
- Fitful Slumbers, by Abutsu
- The Diary of the Waning Moon, by Abutsu
- The Diary of Asukai Masaari, by Asukai Masaari
- The Diary of Lady Ben, by Ben no Naishi
- Diary of Lady Nakatsukasa, by Nakatsukasa no Naishi
- The Confessions of Lady Nijō, by Koga Nijō
- Account of the Takemuki Palace, by Hino Nako

=== Diaries of the Muromachi Period ===
- Account of a Pilgrimage to the Great Shrine of Ise, by Saka Jubutsu
- Gifts from the Capital, by Sokyu
- Reciting Poetry to Myself at Ojima, by Nijō Yoshimoto
- Pilgrimage to Sumiyoshi, by Ashikaga Yoshiakira
- The Visit to Itsukushima of the Lord of the Deer Park, by Imagawa Ryoshun
- A Source of Consolation, by Shōtetsu
- Journey to Fuji, by Asukai Masayo
- Journey to Zenko-ji, by Gyoe
- Account of Fujikawa, by Ichijō Kaneyoshi
- Journey to Shirakawa, by Sōgi
- Journey Along the Tsukushi Road, by Sōgi
- Account of Sogi's Last hours, by Socho
- Account of Utsunoyama, by Socho
- Socho's Notebook, by Socho
- A Pilgrimage to Yoshino, by Sanjonishi Kin'eda
- Journey to See Fuji, by Satomura Joha
- The Diary of Gen'yo, by Gen'yo
- Choshoshi's Journey to Kyushu, by Kinoshira Choshoshi

=== Diaries of the Early Tokugawa Period ===
- A Record of Favors Received, by Matsunaga Teitoku
- A Journey of 1616, by Hayashi Razan
- Travels Round the East, by Anonymous
- A Journey in the Year 1667, by Ikeda Tsunamasa

==== Bashō's Diaries ====
- Exposed in the Fields
- A Pilgrimage to Kashima
- Manuscript in My Knapsack
- Journey to Sarashina
- The Narrow Road of Oku
- The Saga Diary

=== Diaries of the Later Tokugawa Period ===
- Journey to the Northwest, by Kaibara Ekken
- Travels of Gentlemen Emissaries, by Ogyū Sorai
- The Frolic of the Butterfly, by Yamazaki Hokka
- Diary of the Nagasaki Border Guard, by Nagakubo Sekisui
- Diary of Kokan's Trip to the West, by Shiba Kōkan
- Journal of a New Era, by Ōta Nanpo
- Bakin's Diaries, by Takizawa Bakin
- The Diary of Iseki Takako, by Iseki Takako
- The Uraga Diary, by Sakuma Shōzan
- The Nagasaki Diary, by Kawaji Toshiakira
- The Shimoda Diary, by Kawaji Toshiakira
