= Shingoshūi Wakashū =

Shingoshūi Wakashū (新後拾遺和歌集; "New Later Waka Collection of Gleanings"), abbreviated as Shingoshūishū, a title which recollects the Goshūi Wakashū and the Shinshūi Wakashū, is an imperial anthology of Japanese waka poetry. It was finished somewhere around 1383 CE (and revised in 1384), eight years after the Emperor Go-Enyū first ordered it in 1375 at the request of the Ashikaga Shōgun Ashikaga Yoshimitsu. It was compiled by Fujiwara no Tametō (a member of the older conservative Nijō), and finished by Fujiwara no Tameshige (again, a Nijō partisan); its Japanese Preface is notable because it was authored by Nijō Yoshimoto, who Brower and Miner describe as "an important conservative critic and poet of the renga, or linked verses." It consists of twenty volumes containing 1,554 poems.

== See also ==
- List of Japanese poetry anthologies
