= Sandaishū =

First 3 anthologies of Japanese waka poetry

The Sandaishū (三代集) are the first three imperial anthologies of Japanese waka poetry. The Sandaishū provided both the language and organizational principles for the rest of the anthologies thereafter. They are:

- Kokin Wakashū
- Gosen Wakashū
- Shūi Wakashū
