= Nijō Tameuji =

Japanese courtier and waka poet (1222–1286)

Nijō Tameuji (二条為氏, 1222–1286), also known as Fujiwara no Tameuji (藤原為氏), was a Japanese courtier and waka poet of the mid-Kamakura period. His Dharma name was Kakua (覚阿).

== Biography ==
=== Ancestry, birth and early life ===
Nijō Tameuji was born in 1222. His father was Fujiwara no Tameie, and his mother was a daughter of Utsunomiya Yoritsuna. He was Tameie's eldest son, and a grandson of Fujiwara no Teika. He was not known as Nijō in his early life; he received this moniker from his son Tameyo.

=== Political career ===
At the height of his political career, he had attained the Senior Second Rank, and held the position of Provisional Major Counselor (gon-dainagon).

=== Later life and death ===
He entered Buddhist orders in 1285, acquiring the Dharma name Kakua. He died on 3 October 1286, or the fourteenth day of the ninth month of Kōan 9.

=== Descendants ===
He was the father of Nijō Tameyo, Nijō Tamezane and Nijō Jōi.

== Poetry ==
Tameuji learned waka composition from his father Tameie and his grandfather Teika, who between them had compiled three of the imperial anthologies. He was the founder of the conservative Nijō poetic school.

In 1247, he took part in the Hyakusanjū-ban Uta-awase (百三十番歌合), and the following year in the Hōji Hyakushu (宝治百首).

In 1278, on the command of Retired Emperor Kameyama, he compiled the Shokushūi Wakashū. He may have also compiled the Shin Wakashū, although other theories as to its compiler's identity have been proposed.

As the heir to the prestigious Mikohidari house, he was a central figure of the waka society of his day. His disagreements with his brother Tamenori and stepmother Abutsu-ni, however, gave rise to the split between the Nijō, Kyōgoku and Reizei poetic schools, the latter two of which were founded by his brothers Tamenori and Tamesuke, respectively. He had a bitter dispute with his stepmother over valuable manuscripts related to the waka traditions, as well as the inheritance of his father's landholdings.

Among his most famous poems is the following, which was included in the Shokugosen Wakashū, compiled by his father Tameie.

Japanese text	Romanized Japanese	English translation
人問はば 見ずとや言はむ 玉津島 かすむ入江の 春のあけぼの	hito towaba mizu to ya iwan tamatsushima kasumu irie no haru no akebono	If anyone asks, I shall say I haven't seen it— Tamatsu Isle, where haze spreads over the inlet in the dim light of spring dawn.

He left a private collection, the Dainagon Tameuji-kyō Shū (大納言為氏卿集), which collects the poems of both Tameuji himself and his son Tameyo.

== Works cited ==
- Carter, Stephen D. (2005). Just Living: Poems and Prose of the Japanese Monk Tonna. New York, NY: Columbia University Press. ISBN 978-0-231-50077-7.
- Gotō, Shigeo (1994). "Fujiwara no Tameuji" 藤原為氏. Encyclopedia Nipponica (in Japanese). Shogakukan.
- Katō, Mutsumi (1994). "Nijō Tameuji" 二条為氏. Asahi Nihon Rekishi Jinbutsu Jiten (in Japanese). Asahi Shinbun-sha.
- Keene, Donald (1999) [1993]. A History of Japanese Literature, Vol. 1: Seeds in the Heart – Japanese Literature from Earliest Times to the Late Sixteenth Century (paperback ed.). New York, NY: Columbia University Press. ISBN 978-0-231-11441-7.
- "Nijō Tameuji" 二条為氏. Mypaedia (in Japanese). Hitachi. 1996.
- Nakagawa, Hiroo (1986). "Shin Wakashū seiritsu jiki shōkō" (PDF). Mita Kokubun (in Japanese) (6). Keiō University Kokubungaku Kenkyūshitsu: 80–86.
