= Shin'yō Wakashū =

Collection of Japanese poetry compiled by Munenaga Shinnō ca. 1381

The Waka Collection of New Leaves (新葉和歌集, Shin'yō Wakashū) is a Nanboku-chō period collection of Japanese poetry compiled by Munenaga Shinnō ca. 1381. Although commissioned by Emperor Chōkei (r. 1368-83) of the Southern Court, it is not included in the Nijūichidaishū, i.e., the twenty-one imperial waka anthologies for political reasons – the "official" anthologies had been sponsored by the rival Northern Court and the Ashikaga shōguns.

The Shin'yō Wakashū consists of twenty books, 1,420 poems in total. The poems included are mainly from the Nijō poetic school, but there is also a substantial amount of warrior-class poems.
