= Shinsenzai Wakashū =

The Shinsenzai Wakashū (新千載和歌集; "New Waka Collection of a Thousand Years"), sometimes abbreviated as Shinsenzaishū, a title which recollects the Senzai Wakashū, is an imperial anthology of Japanese waka. The title is in opposition to the prior Senzai Wakashū. It was completed in 1359, three years after being commissioned by Emperor Go-Kōgon at the request of the shōgun Ashikaga Takauji. It was compiled by Fujiwara no Tamesada (who also compiled the Shokugoshuishu, and was a member of the older conservative Nijō). It consists of twenty volumes containing 2,364 poems. The collection is considered mediocre, but an interesting example of how power continued to transfer from the Emperors to the military authorities- traditionally, announcing the collection of a new Imperial anthology was the exclusive privilege of an Emperor.
