= Shokusenzai Wakashū =

The Shokusenzai Wakashū (続千載和歌集; "Waka Collection of a Thousand Years Continued", a title which recollects the Senzai Wakashū) is a Japanese imperial anthology of waka poetry. It was finished somewhere around 1320 CE, two years after the Retired Emperor Go-Uda first ordered it in 1318. It was compiled by Fujiwara no Tameyo (who also compiled the Shingosen Wakashū, and was a member of the older conservative Nijō). It consists of twenty volumes containing 2,159 poems.
