= Gyokuyō Wakashū =

The Gyokuyō Wakashū (玉葉和歌集; Collection of Jeweled Leaves, a title which recollects the Kin'yō Wakashū) was an imperial anthology of Japanese waka poetry. The work was completed somewhere between 1313 and 1314, two or three years after the Retired Emperor Fushimi first ordered it around 1311.

The anthology was compiled by Fujiwara no Tamekane, also known as Kyōgoku no Tamekane, who was descended from Fujiwara no Teika. Tamekane was the leader of the Kyōgoku branch of the family, which, along with the more junior Reizei branch, advocated for innovation and freedom in poetry, rather than the emphasis on form and tradition preferred by the senior Nijō branch.

The work consists of twenty volumes containing 2,796 poems. This and the Fūga Wakashū would be the only Imperial anthologies compiled by either of the innovative factions.
