= Shokushūi Wakashū =

The Shokushūi Wakashū (続拾遺和歌集; "Collection of Gleanings of Japanese Poems Continued", a title which recollects the Goshūi Wakashū) is a Japanese imperial anthology of waka poetry. It was finished in about 1278 CE, two years after the Retired Emperor Kameyama first ordered it around 1276. It was compiled by Fujiwara no Tameuji (grandson of Fujiwara no Teika, and eldest son of Fujiwara no Tameie; he founded the Nijō poetic clan). It consists of twenty volumes containing 1,461 poems.

== See also ==
- 1278 in poetry
- List of Japanese poetry anthologies
