= Fūga Wakashū =

The Fūga Wakashū (風雅和歌集; "Poetry Collection of Elegance"), also abbreviated as the Fūgashū (風雅集) was an imperial anthology of Japanese waka; it was compiled somewhere between 1344 and 1346 CE, by Emperor Hanazono, who also wrote its Chinese and Japanese Prefaces. It consists of twenty volumes containing 2,210 poems. This, with the Gyokuyoshu was one of the only two Imperial anthologies to be heavily influenced or compiled by persons affiliated with the innovative Kyogoku and Reizei factions. As befits two clans descended from Fujiwara no Teika, this collection harkens back to his styles of poetry; Miner and Brower consider it to be "the last of the great collections of Court poetry."
