= Shokugosen Wakashū =

The Shokugosen Wakashū (続後撰和歌集) ("Later Collection Continued") was an imperial anthology of Japanese waka poetry. It was finished in 1251 CE, three years after the Retired Emperor Go-Saga first ordered it in 1248. It was compiled by Fujiwara no Tameie, son of Fujiwara no Teika. It consists of twenty volumes containing 1,368 poems. It is characterized by the conservative taste and general competency (but not excellence) of the Nijō faction that would be founded by Tameie's son.

== See also ==
- 1251 in poetry
- 1251 in literature
- List of Japanese anthologies
