= Fujiwara no Tamekane =

Japanese poet (1254–1332)

Fujiwara no Tamekane (藤原為兼, Fujiwara Tamekane; 1254–1332), also known as Kyōgoku Tamekane (京極為兼), was a prominent Japanese poet, an official in the Imperial court of Emperor Fushimi, and a senior bureaucrat of the Kamakura shogunate.

Tamekane was the grandson of esteemed poet Fujiwara no Tameie.

In the Imperial Daijō-kan, he rose to the rank of Chūnagon and Dainagon.

In 1298, he was banished to Sado Island. Later, this exile was modified to banishment in Tosa province.

In 1312, he compiled the Gyokuyō Wakashū.

== Selected works ==
In a statistical overview derived from writings by and about Kyōgoku Tamekane, OCLC/WorldCat encompasses roughly 10+ works in 30+ publications in 2 languages and 400+ library holdings.

- 玉葉和歌集 (1647)
- 訳注為兼卿和哥抄 (1963)
- 為兼・為相等書狀並案 (1988)

== See also ==
- Gyokuyō Wakashū
