= Shinshokukokin Wakashū =

Japanese poetry anthology

The Shinshokukokin Wakashū (新続古今和歌集; "New Poetry Anthology of Ancient and Modern Times Continued", a reference to the Shokukokin Wakashū or "New Poetry Anthology of Ancient and Modern Times") was an imperial anthology of Japanese waka; it was finished somewhere around 1439 CE, six years after the Emperor Go-Hanazono first ordered it in 1433 at the request of the Ashikaga Shōgun Ashikaga Yoshinori. It was compiled by Asukai Masayo (the Asukai poetic family, traditionally aligned with conservative Nijō, had taken their place in the Court when the Nijo family fell into problems; they nevertheless persecuted the Nijo's ancient enemies, which led them to, among other things, omit any poems of Shōtetsu from this collection); its Japanese and Chinese Prefaces were written by Ichijō Kanera. It consists of twenty volumes containing 2,144 poems.

The unusual feature of Shinshokukokin Wakashū is that it challenged Ashikaga Yoshinori with a compilation agenda that undermined shogun's authority.

This was the last Imperial anthology. It is notable for including a large number of poets (close to 800) ranging from the Man'yoshu period all the way up to contemporary poets.

== See also ==
- List of Japanese poetry anthologies
- 1439 in poetry
