= Shinchokusen Wakashū =

Shinchokusen Wakashū (新勅撰和歌集; "New Imperial Waka Collection"), abbreviated as Shinchokusenshū, is an imperial anthology of Japanese waka, initially compiled in ~1234 CE at the behest of the Retired Emperor Go-Horikawa. It was compiled by Fujiwara no Teika (who also wrote its Japanese preface). It consists of twenty volumes containing 1,376 poems. Miner and Brower remark that "The collection reflects Teika's late preference for poetry of a relatively plain, simple style." This sentiment accurately reflects its conservative selection, taking 47 poems from Fujiwara no Ietaka, 36 from Fujiwara no Yoshitsune, a full 35 from Fujiwara no Shunzei, along with 30 by Saionji Kintsune and 27 from the priest Jakuren.
