= Shokugoshūi Wakashū =

14th century Japanese poetry anthology

The Shokugoshūi Wakashū (続後拾遺和歌集; "Later Collection of Gleanings of Japanese Poems Continued", a title which recollects the Shokushūi Wakashū), is a Japanese imperial anthology of waka poetry. It was finished somewhere around 1325 or 1326 CE, two or three years after the Retired Emperor Go-Daigo first ordered it in 1323. It was compiled initially by Fujiwara no Tamefuji, but had to be finished by Fujiwara no Tamesada (both members of the older conservative Nijō). It consists of twenty volumes containing 1,347 poems.
