= Shokukokin Wakashū =

Japanese imperial anthology of poetry

The Shokukokin Wakashū (続古今和歌集; "Collection of Ancient and Modern Times Continued", a title which recollects the Kokin Wakashū) is a Japanese imperial anthology of waka, a type of poetry in classical Japanese literature. It was finished in 1265 CE, six years after the Retired Emperor Go-Saga first ordered it in 1259. It was compiled by Fujiwara no Tameie (son of Fujiwara no Teika) with the aid of Fujiwara no Motoie, Fujiwara no Ieyoshi, Fujiwara no Yukiee, and Fujiwara no Mitsutoshi; like most Imperial anthologies, there is a Japanese and a Chinese Preface, but their authorship is obscure and essentially unknown. It consists of twenty volumes containing 1,925 poems.

== See also ==
- 1265 in poetry
- List of Japanese poetry anthologies
