= Goshūi Wakashū =

"The language of poetry should be like brocade and the feeling deeper than the ocean." -from Michitoshi's Preface

The Goshūi Wakashū (後拾遺和歌集, Later Collection of Gleanings of Japanese Poems), sometimes abbreviated as Goshūishū, is an imperial anthology of Japanese waka compiled in 1086 at the behest of Emperor Shirakawa (who had ordered it to be started in 1075). It was compiled by the conservative Fujiwara no Michitoshi (1047-1099), who wrote its preface. It consists of twenty volumes containing 1,220 poems. It is noted for a comparatively large contingent of poems written by women.

Its name "Later Collection" comes from the fact that it succeeds the Shūi Wakashū ("Collection of Gleanings").
