= Reizei family =

Branch of the Fujiwara clan

Reizei 冷泉
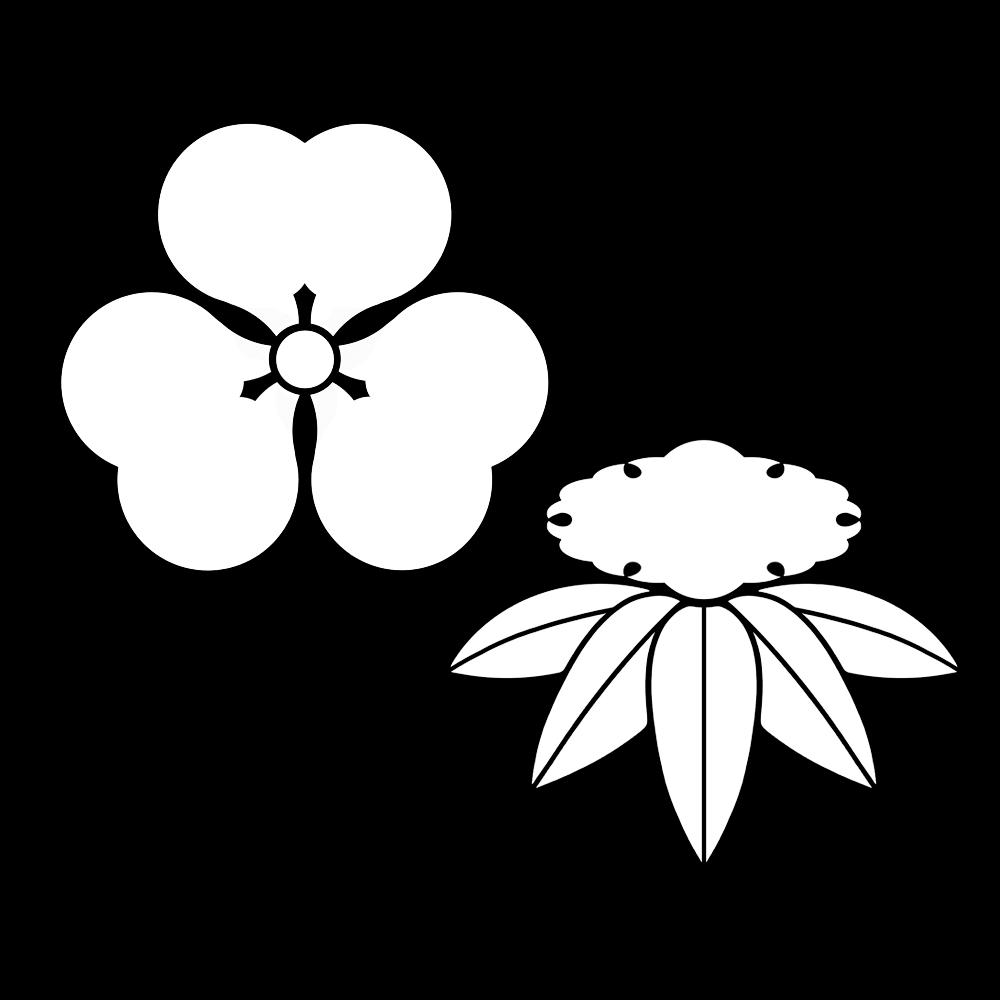
- Mon: Katabami and Yukisasa
- Parent house: Fujiwara clan
- Founder: Reizei Tamesuke
- Current head: Reizei Tamehito
- Founding year: 14th century
- Ruled until: still extant
- Cadet branches: Yanagiwara family

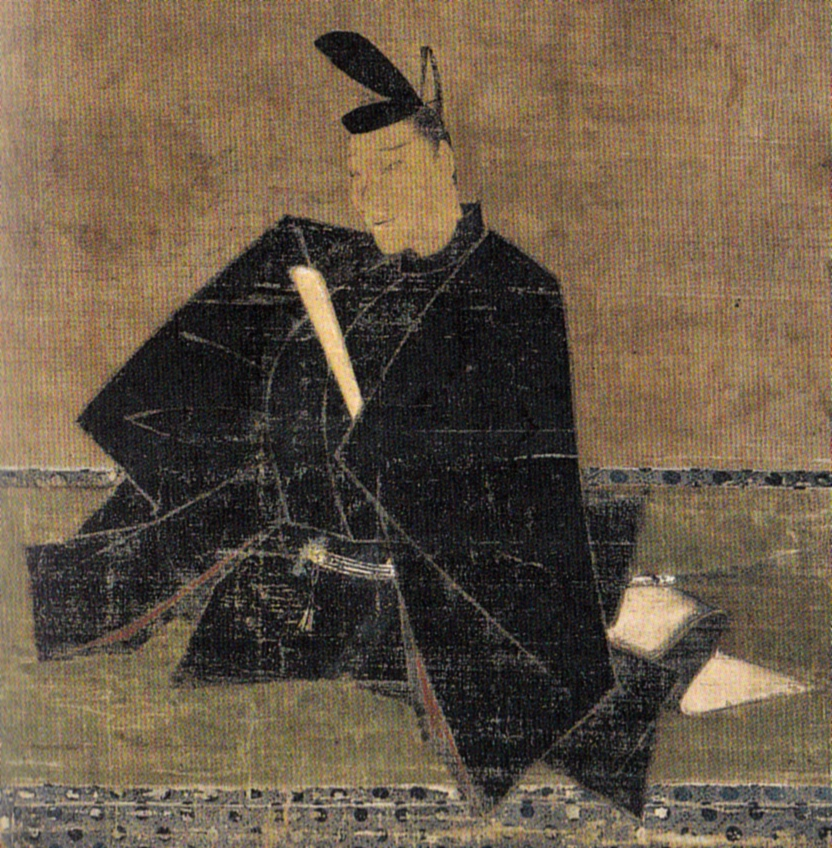
Fujiwara no Teika, one of the ancestors of the Reizei family

Reizei family (冷泉家, Reizei-ke) is a Japanese kuge (court noble) family from Kyoto. It is a branch of the Fujiwara clan, with a long poetic tradition.

== History ==
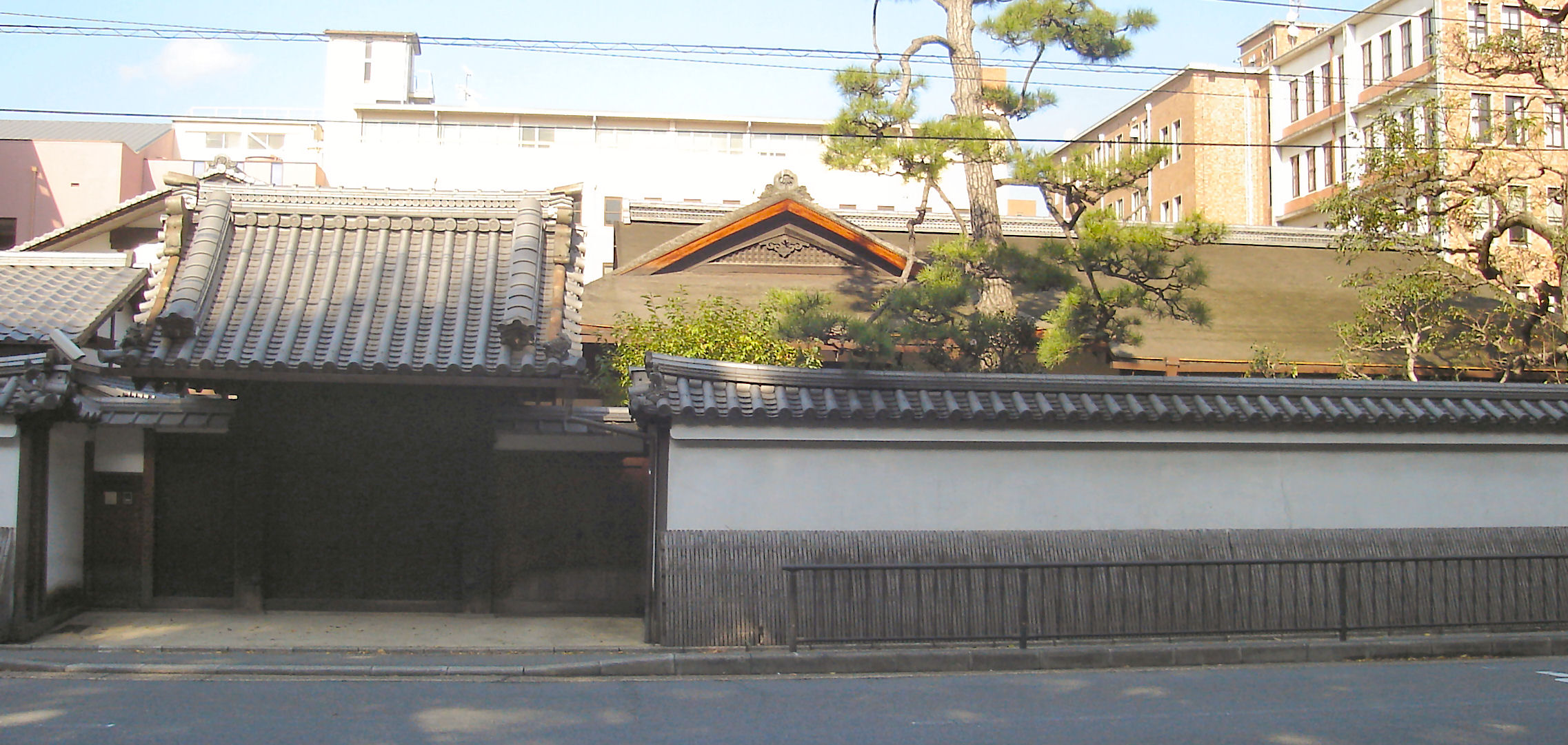
The Reizei residence in Kyoto, next to the Imperial Palace

The Reizei family descended from Fujiwara no Michinaga through his sixth son, Nagaie (1005-1064); this line was known by the name of Mikohidari until Tamesuke took the name of Reizei. Nagaie's second son Tadaie (1033-1091) had a second son, Toshitada (1071-1123), whose fourth son Toshinari (also known as Fujiwara no Shunzei, 1114-1204) had a second son, Sadaie (also known as Fujiwara no Teika, 1162-1241), whose third son Tameie (1198-1275) was Reizei Tamesuke's father.

The present (25th generation) head of the senior line of the family is Reizei Tamehito (born 1944).

For eight centuries, the family secretly preserved, under imperial order, an important collection of documents. On April 4, 1980, this collection of about 200,000 pieces was made public by Reizei Tametou (1914-1986). The following year, a library in Tokyo was created specially for their conservation. Not all of the documents have yet been identified, but some have already been classified as national treasures.

The Reizei residence is located to the north side of Kyoto Imperial Palace, and is the last extant original court noble residence in Kyoto. It was registered as an Important Cultural Property.

== Heads of the Reizei family ==
- 1- Reizei Tamesuke (1263-1328)
- 2- Reizei Tamehide (d. 1372)
- 3- Reizei Tamemasa (1361-1417)
- 4- Reizei Tameyuki (1393-1439)
- 5- Reizei Tametomi
- 6- Reizei Tamehiro (1450-1526)
- 7- Reizei Tamekazu (1486-1549)
- 8- Reizei Tamemasu (1516-1570)
- 9- Reizei Tamemitsu (1559-1619)
- 10- Reizei Tameyori
- 11- Reizei Tameharu
- 12- Reizei Tamekiyo
- 13- Reizei Tametsuna
- 14- Reizei Tamehisa (1686-1741)
- 15- Reizei Tamemura (1712-1774)
- 16- Reizei Tameyasu
- 17- Reizei Tamefumi (1752-1822)
- 18- Reizei Tamenori
- 19- Reizei Tametake
- 20- Reizei Tametada (1824-1885)
- 21- Reizei Tamemoto (1854-1905)
- 22- Reizei Tametsugi (1881-1946)
- 23- Reizei Tameomi (d. 1944)
- 24- Reizei Tametou (1914-1986)
- 25- Reizei Tamehito (1944-)

== See also ==
- Reizei Tamechika
