= Nihon Koten Bungaku Daijiten =

Nihon Koten Bungaku Daijiten (Japanese: 日本古典文学大辞典) is a reference work about Japanese literature published by Iwanami Shoten circa 1983-1985.
