= Shinshūi Wakashū =

Shinshūi Wakashū (新拾遺和歌集; "New Waka Collection of Gleanings"), occasionally abbreviated as Shinshūishū, a title which recollects the Shūi Wakashū, is the 19th imperial anthology of Japanese waka poetry. It was finished late in 1364 CE, a year after Emperor Go-Kōgon first ordered it in 1363 at the request of the Ashikaga Shōgun Ashikaga Yoshiakira. It was compiled by Nijō Tameaki (1295-1364), a member of the older conservative Nijō house, who died in 1364 and was unable to complete his task; the priest Ton'a finished it. It consists of twenty volumes containing 1,920 poems.
