= Senzai Wakashū =

Imperial anthology of Japanese waka poetry

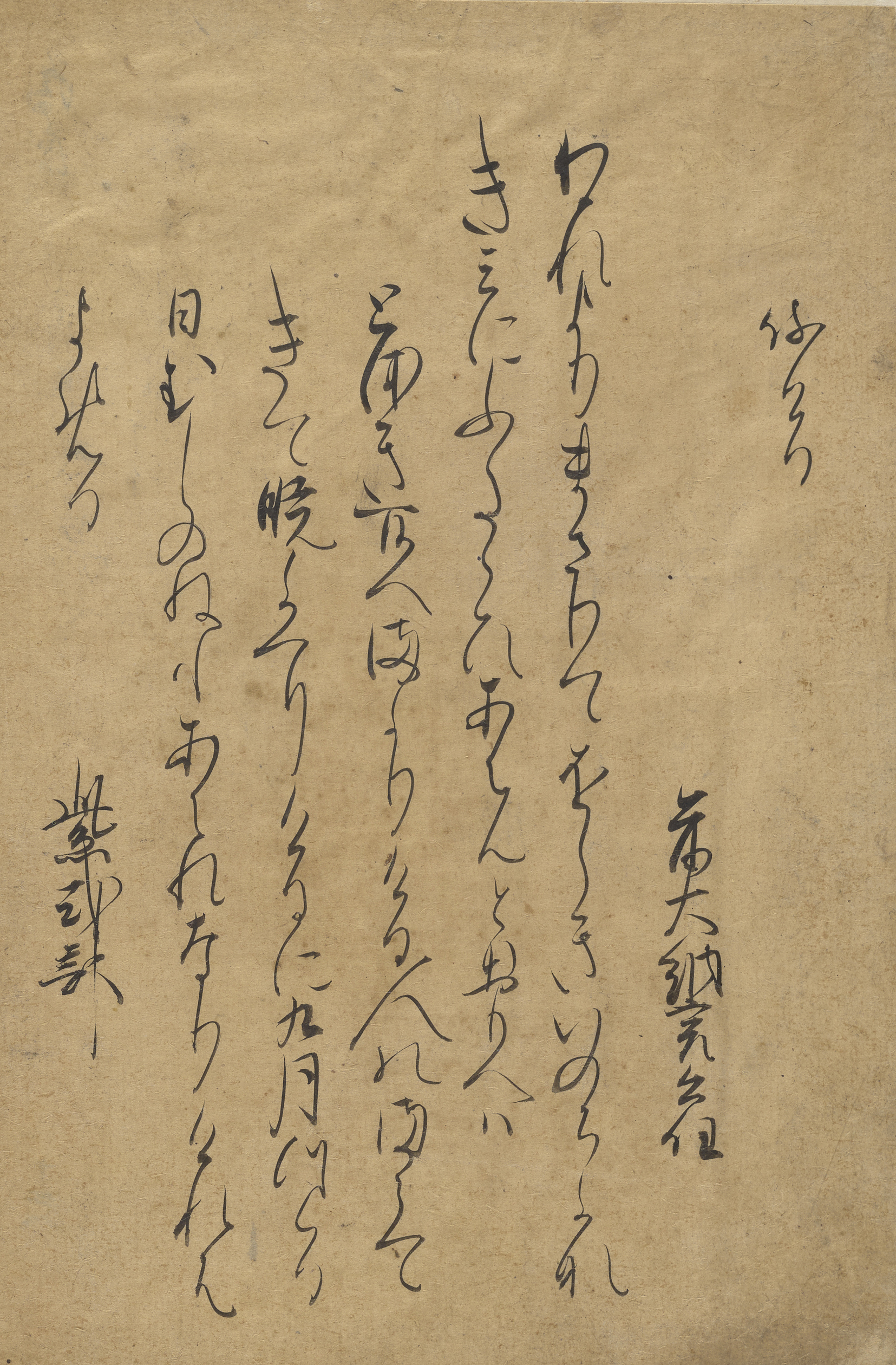
Poem 478 by Murasaki Shikibu in the Senzaishū calligraphy by Nijō Tameuji

The Senzai Wakashū (千載和歌集; "Collection of a Thousand Years"), often abbreviated as Senzaishū, is an imperial anthology of Japanese waka poetry. Compiled in 1187 by Fujiwara no Shunzei at the request of the Retired Emperor Go-Shirakawa, who ordered it in 1183. It consists of twenty volumes containing 1,285 poems.
