= Shingosen Wakashū =

1303 imperial anthology of Japanese waka poetry

The Shingosen Wakashū (新後撰和歌集; "New Later Collection of Waka"), often abbreviated as Shingosenshū, is an imperial anthology of Japanese waka poetry. The title is in opposition to the previous Gosen Wakashū. It was completed in 1303, two years after the Retired Emperor Go-Uda first ordered. It was compiled by Fujiwara no Tameyo and consists of twenty volumes containing 1,606 poems.
