= Fujiwara no Teika =

Japanese poet and court noble

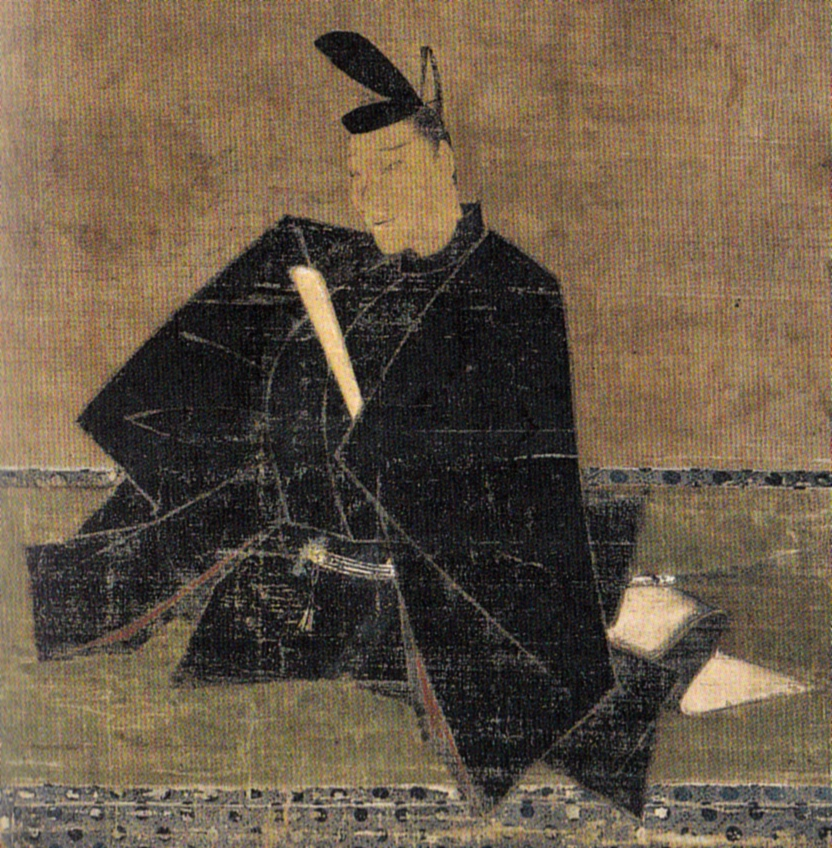
- A portrait of Teika; Attributed to Fujiwara no Nobuzane; Kamakura period
- Born: 1162; Kyoto, Heian Japan
- Died: September 26, 1241 (aged 78–79); Kyoto, Kamakura shogunate
- Occupations: Anthologist, calligrapher, literary critic, novelist, poet, scribe

Fujiwara no Sadaie or Teika (Note: Japanese pronunciation: [ɸɯ̈̀.(ɟ̟͡)ʑí.β̞ä́.ɾä́ nó̞ | sä̀.dä́.ì.è̞, -nó̞ sä́-, -nó̞ (|) té̞ì.kä̀, -nó̞ (|) té̞è̞.kä̀, -nó̞ | tè̞í.kä́, -nó̞ | tè̞é̞.kä́, -nó̞ (|) té̞é̞.kä́]) (藤原 定家; 1162 – September 26, 1241) was a Japanese anthologist, calligrapher, literary critic, novelist, poet, and scribe of the late Heian and early Kamakura periods. His influence was enormous, and he is counted as among the greatest of Japanese poets, and perhaps the greatest master of the waka form – an ancient poetic form consisting of five lines with a total of 31 syllables.

Teika's critical ideas on composing poetry were extremely influential and studied until as late as the Meiji era. A member of a poetic clan, Teika's father was the noted poet Fujiwara no Shunzei. After coming to the attention of the Retired Emperor Go-Toba (1180–1239; r. 1183–1198), Teika began his long and distinguished career, spanning multiple areas of aesthetic endeavor. His relationship with Go-Toba was at first cordial and led to commissions to compile anthologies, but later resulted in his banishment from the retired emperor's court. His descendants and ideas would dominate classical Japanese poetry for centuries afterwards.

== Biography ==
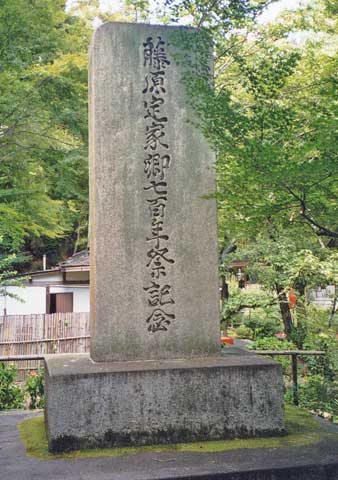
Monument to Fujiwara no Teika, Ogura, Kyoto

=== Birth ===
Teika was born to a minor and distant branch of the aristocratic and courtly clan, the Fujiwara, in 1162, sometime after the Fujiwara regents had lost their political pre-eminence in the Imperial court during the Hōgen Rebellion. His branch of the clan sought prestige and power in the court by aligning itself with the Mikohidari family, and by specializing in artistic endeavors, principally poetry. Such specialization was not unusual; branches of extended clans were not in a position to compete directly in politics with the head branch of the clan (or indeed other clans because of their junior status), but could compete in more restricted aesthetic pursuits. (The Mikohidari, also known as the Miko, were a cadet branch of the Fujiwaras, through Fujiwara no Michinaga's sixth son, Fujiwara no Nagaie (1005–1064); the Mikohidari were themselves aligned with the more senior Kujō branch of the original Fujiwara, who opposed the Rokujō family.)

Teika's grandfather was the venerable poet Fujiwara no Toshitada. His father was Fujiwara no Shunzei (1114–1204), a well known and greatly respected poet (and judge of poetry competitions), who had compiled the seventh Imperial anthology of waka (the Senzai Wakashū). His niece became a well-respected poet of waka and renga, known as Kengozen or Shunzei's Daughter, whom he occasionally sought out for poetic advice. His elder brother, Fujiwara no Nariee (sometimes romanized as "Nariie"; 藤原成家), was somewhat successful in court, but not nearly as much as his niece. Teika's foster-brother, the priest Jakuren or "Sadanaga" c. 1139–1202 was successful as a poet although his career was cut tragically short; he had been adopted by Shunzei when Shunzei's younger brother "retired from the world".

=== Career ===
Teika's goals as the senior male of his branch were to inherit and cement his father's position in poetry, and to advance his own reputation (thereby also improving the political fortunes of his own clan in the court). While his life was marked by repeated illness and wildly shifting fortunes – only partially moderated by his father's long-lasting influence in court (Shunzei would live to the advanced age of 90), the young and poetically inclined Retired Emperor Go-Toba's patronage lead to some of Teika's greatest successes.

==== Go-Toba's patronage ====
The Retired Emperor Go-Toba announced, in the second year of his abdication (1200, the second year of the Shōji era) that he would be conducting a poetry contest. Retired Emperors frequently became more influential after their retirement from the office of Emperor rather than as the actual Emperor, since they were free from the highly restricting ceremonial requirements and politics of the court. Go-Toba was 20 when he abdicated; he was the consummate amateur, skilled at playing the lute, considered an authority on traditional learning and courtly precedent, excellent at playing Go, and fond of equestrian pursuits such as horseback archery, shooting at running dogs, and swordsmanship.

Go-Toba regarded all these pursuits as hobbies, taking one up and dropping another. One of these was his support of poetry, especially the waka. Immediately after his abdication, he had announced that he would hold two poetry contests, each requiring a number of preeminent poets to compose some 100 waka in a particular thematic progression, known as the hyakushu genre of poem sequences. The first contest (Go-Toba In shodo hyakushu 後鳥羽院初度百首; "Ex-Emperor Go-Toba's First Hundred-Poem Sequences") was considered a crucial political nexus; if a clan's poet did well and impressed the powerful (and youthful) Go-Toba, the clan would benefit considerably.

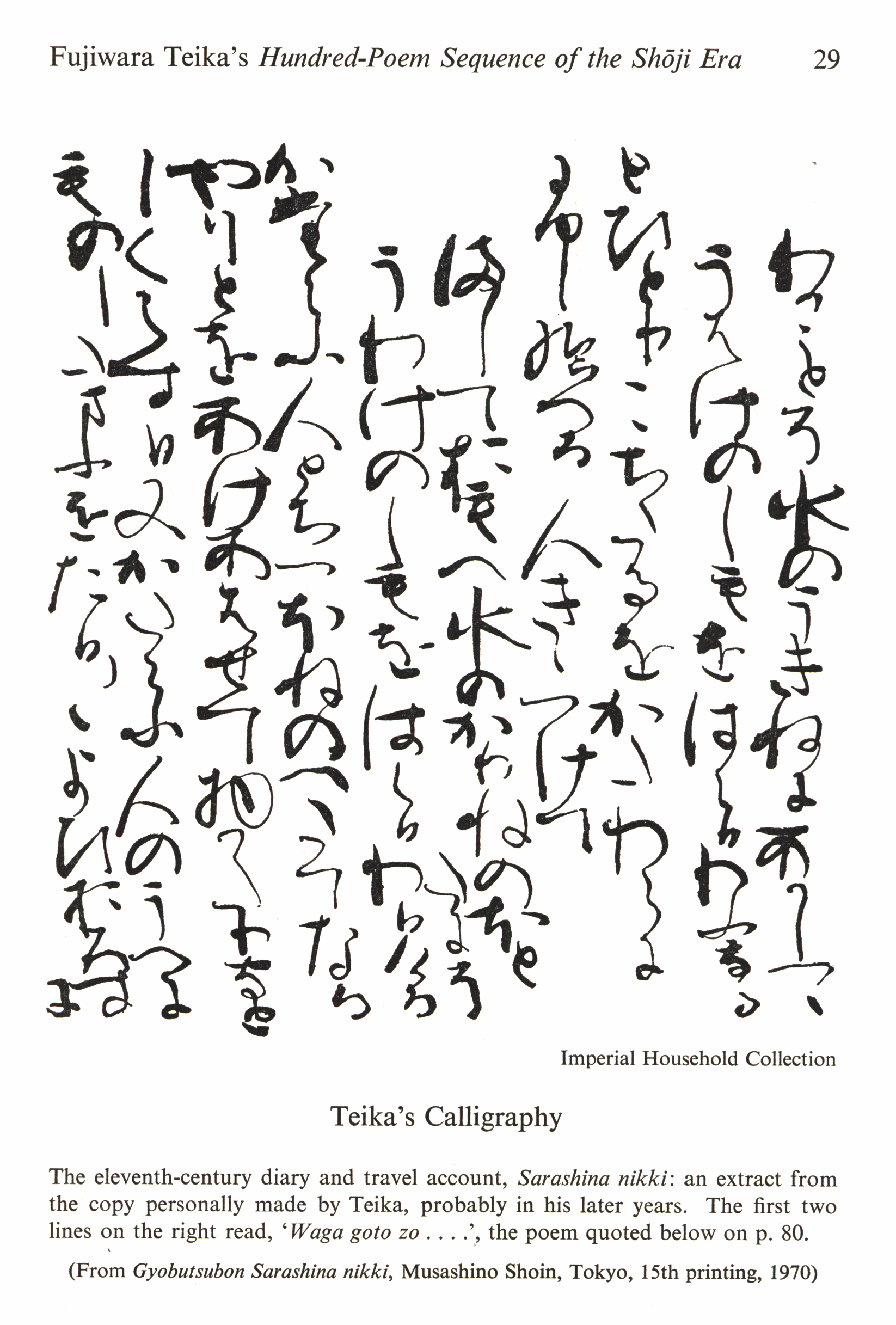
Another example of Teika's calligraphy; here he has copied a portion of Sugawara no Takasue no musume's Sarashina nikki

Teika's diary records that he looked forward to this chance to improve himself. He was 38, and had reached middle age. While he was recognized as a talented poet, his career was stagnant; he had been in the Palace Guards of the Left for twenty years, and had not been promoted for nearly 10. He was "Lesser Commander of the Palace Guards of the Left" with little prospect of further advancement.

Teika had wider political problems: the influence of his patrons, the Kujōs, over the Emperors had declined drastically. Minamoto no Michichika (d. 1202) had insinuated himself into Imperial circles through Go-Toba's former nursemaid; with this leverage, Michichika's adopted daughter (the then-Shōgun's daughter, who had decided to marry his daughter off to the Emperor, using Michichika as a go-between – contrary to the Shōgun's usual policy of favoring Kujo Kanezane. The Shōgun's lack of confidence allowed Michichika to push Go-Toba into firing Kanezane as kampaku in 1196) became Go-Toba's concubine (making Michichika the Retired Emperor Go-Toba's father in law), and they had his first heir in 1195. The shame of this usurpation led Go-Toba's first wife, Ninshi, to retire from the court. As Ninshi was the daughter of the Kujō's leader Kujō Kanezane, the Kujō's influence in court diminished considerably, even to the extent of Kanezane and Yoshitsune (d. 1206; once the regent and prime minister) being driven from the court in 1196; with the diminution of their influence, so dimmed Teika's prospects. Teika expressed his disappointment through poetry, such as this example, written when he was "passed over for promotion in the spring list" in 1187 (he would eventually be promoted in 1190, but as his good and encouraging friend Saigyō died that year, it was cold comfort):

Rōmaji
English

toshi furedo
kokoro no haru wa
yoso nagara
nagamenarenuru
akebono no sora

Another year gone by
And still no spring warms my heart,
It's nothing to me
But now I am accustomed
To stare at the sky at dawn.

In fact, Teika was initially not invited, the instigation of the rival Rokujō clan's leader, Suetsune and the connivance of Michichika. Suetsune and Teika were bitter enemies; just a few months before, Teika had humiliated Suetsune by calling him "that fake poet" and publicly refusing to participate in a poetry competition with Suetsune. His revenge was well-done; Teika was furious, writing in his Meigetsuki: :"I never heard of such a thing as choosing only senior poets [writes Teika about the pretext used to exclude him]. I can just see Suetsune at the bottom of this, contriving by some bribe that I be left out. It has to be Suetsune, Tsuneie, that whole family. Well, I have no regrets, for there is no possible hope for me now. But I did write in confidence to Kintsune so this may all come out eventually. He has replied that there is still room for hope."

I gather that it was probably not the Emperor who decided on the rules for the hundred-poem competition. It was due entirely to the machinations of Michichika. One feels like flicking him away in disgust.

Teika's appeals to the unrelenting Michichika failed, and so Shunzei stepped in with an eloquent letter (the well-known Waji sojo; "Appeal in Japanese" – writing in Japanese as opposed to the official Chinese was considered a mark of sincerity) addressed to Go-Toba, arguing that such an exclusion was without precedent, and motivated by base jealousy on their opponent's part:

Of late the people who call themselves poets have all been mediocrities. The poems they compose are unpleasant to hear, wordy and lacking in finesse.

As Keene writes, "He denounced by name Teika's enemy Suetsune, calling him an ignoramus, and urged Gotoba not to be misled by his machinations." Gotoba relented at this appeal from a man he greatly respected (the second time Shunzei had so interceded on Teika's behalf; the first time was in 1185 when Teika had lost his temper and struck a superior – the lesser general Masayuki – with a lamp). He allowed Teika, along with two other "young" poets, Fujiwara no Ietaka (1159–1237; 1158–1237, according to Brower), adopted son of Jakuren and pupil to Shunzei, and Takafusa (1148–1209) to enter the contest. Teika was overjoyed at this turn of events:

Early this morning came a message from Lord Kintsune that last evening the Ex-Emperor ordered my inclusion among the participants for the hundred-poem sequences.....To have been added to the list for this occasion fills me with inexpressible joy. Though they can hinder me no more, I am still convinced that the trouble was all due to the machinations of those evil men. And that it has turned out this way is a fulfillment of all my hopes and prayers for this life and the next.

Teika furiously worked for more than two weeks to complete the full sequence, and when he finally turned his Shoji hyakushu in a day late, Go-Toba was so eager he read the poems immediately. Go-Toba's personal secretary, Minamoto Ienaga, kept a diary (the Minamoto Ienaga nikki) which eulogistically concerned itself with Go-Toba's poetic activities, and he records that it was Teika's hundred-poem sequence, and more specifically, poem number 93 which was directly responsible for Teika's being granted the special permission necessary to be admitted to the Retired Emperor's court (distinct from the reigning emperor's court; this special admittance was crucial to any future patronage); this is scarcely surprising as the 100-poem sequences submitted were of uniformly high quality (more poems originating in the sequences Go-Toba commissioned were included in the Shin Kokinshū than from any other source except the enormous "Poetry Contest in 1,500 Rounds").

Rōmaji
English

Kimi ga yo ni
Kasumi o wakeshi
Ashitazu no
Sara ni sawabe no
Ne o ya nakubeki.

In our Lord's gracious reign,
Will I still have cause to cry aloud
As cries the crane
That now stalks desolate in reedy marshes
Far from its former cloudland of spring haze?

This poem is both a fine example of the jukkai ("personal grievances") genre and as Minamoto no Ienaga first pointed out, also an allusion to the poem (preserved, along with Go-Shirakawa's reply, in the Imperial anthology Senzai Wakashū) Shunzei had sent Retired Emperor Go-Shirakawa 14 years previously, imploring him to forgive Teika for striking a superior with a candlestick; "the allusion conveys the hope that just as Shunzei's poem obtained his erring son's restoration to rank and office under Go-Shirakawa, now Teika's own poem will win him admission to Go-Toba's Court despite his connection with the "disgraced" Kujō faction."

Rōmaji
English

Ashitazu no
Kumoji mayoishi
Toshi kurete
Kasumi o sae ya
Hedatehatsubeki

Now that the year
Has closed in which it lost its way
Upon the cloudland path,
Must the crane still be kept apart
Even from the haze of a new spring?

Teika and Go-Toba would have a close and productive relationship; Teika was favored in such ways as being appointed by Go-Toba as one of the six compilers (and de facto head compiler by virtue of his dedication and force of personality in addition to his already established reputation as a poet) of the eighth Imperial Anthology of waka poetry, the esteemed Shin Kokinshū (c. 1205, "New Collection of Japanese Poetry, Ancient and Modern") which Go-Toba ordered to be written after the success of the hundred-poem sequences (which furnished a base for the collection). In order to compile it, Go-Toba had resurrected the defunct institution, the Poetry Bureau in the seventh month of 1201, with fifteen yoryudo, or "contributing members", and three added later), who participated in the many poetry contests and similar activities that soon began taking place in the Bureau; of the Fellows, six (Minamoto Michitomo, Fujiwara Ariie, Teika, Fujiwara Ietaka, Fujiwara Masatsune and Jakuren, who would not live to finish the task, and was not replaced. Minamoto Ienaga was apparently detached from being Go-Toba's personal secretary to instead serve as the secretary for the compilation committee; his and Teika's diaries have survived, affording an unprecedentedly good view of the inner workings of how an imperial anthology was created) were chosen to compile the Shin Kokinshū in the eleventh month of 1201.

As if the honor of helping to compile the Shin Kokinshū and of having a remarkable 46 of his poems (including three from the Shoji hyakushu) included were not enough, Teika was later appointed in 1232 by the Retired Emperor Go-Horikawa to compile – by himself – the ninth Imperial Anthology, the Shinchokusen Wakashū (c. 1235; "New Imperial Collection"). Teika was the first person to have ever been a compiler of two Imperial anthologies.

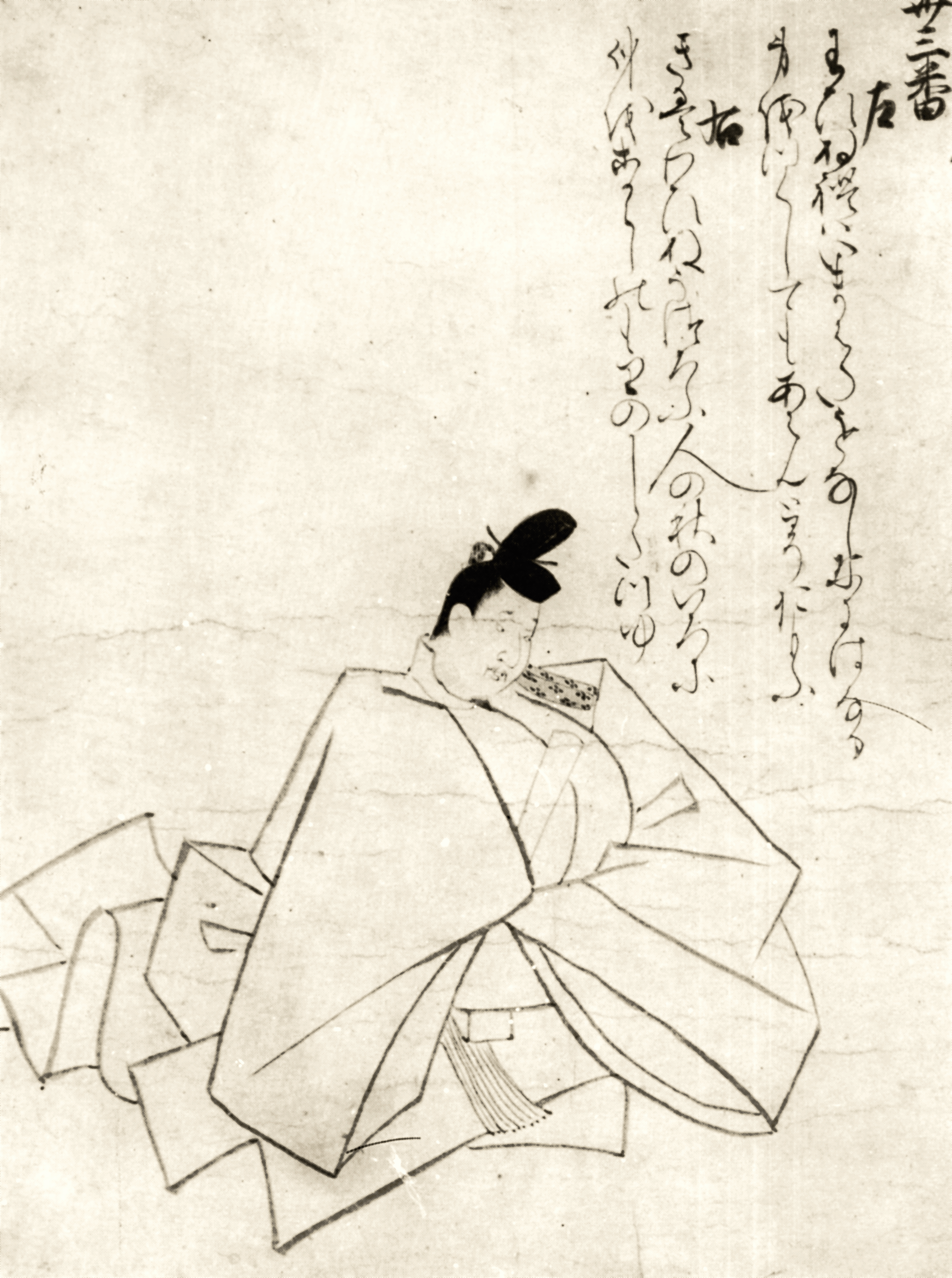
A painting of Teika, possibly by his son, Tameie

==== Teika and Go-Toba quarrel ====
This favorable patronage and collaboration eventually soured even as Teika's relation with Emperor Juntoku and Minamoto no Sanetomo deepened, over many things such as differences in how one should use "association and progression" (as Brower terms it) in poetic sequences. In 100-poem sequences and the like, the poems were usually in one of several groups (the four seasons were common ones, as was love); the poems generally formed an integrated sequence in which they dealt with the same subject matter, proceeding from stage to stage (for instance, a sequence on Love might proceed from loneliness, to falling in love, to a mature relationship, and then the sorrow when it ends) or which refer to elements of previous poems (a technique later central to renga sequences). Go-Toba used such techniques consistently and often, whereas Teika's use was more erratic. During the compilation of the Shin Kokinshū, there were other differences, apparently over how wide-ranging a net to throw for poems:

In a situation like the present, where he [Go-Toba] has included poems by a great many people one has never heard of, whose names have remained in almost total obscurity for generations, and persons who have only recently begun to attract attention had as many as ten poems apiece included – in such a situation it is no particular distinction for me to have forty-odd [46] poems chosen, or for Ietaka to have a score or more. The Ex-Sovereign's recent decisions make it appear he is choosing men rather than poems – a questionable procedure.

Teika's displeasure manifested itself in more petty ways, such as refusing to attend a banquet in 1205 (300 years after the Kokinshū was completed) celebrating the official completion of the Shin Kokinshū because there was no precedent for such a banquet (apparently he was not convinced by the precedent of the banquet celebrating the completion of the Nihon Shoki); Go-Toba reciprocated by cutting Teika out of the process of continually revising the Shin Kokinshū (while it was officially complete by the date of the banquet, it was de facto incomplete as the Japanese Preface only existed in rough drafts and because Go-Toba would continue revising the selection of poems for some time thereafter, only releasing the final edition approximately 6 years later, sometime after the ninth month of 1210; indeed, Go-Toba would continue revising it until his death, although the later revisions are not extant).

In addition, there apparently were serious personality conflicts, which lead Go-Toba to write once, after praising Teika's poetry, that:

The way Teika behaved, as if he knew all about poetry, was really quite extraordinary. Especially when he was defending his own opinion, he would act like the man who insisted a stag was a horse. He was utterly oblivious of others, and would exceed all reason, refusing to listen to anything other people had to say.

(The stag and horse anecdote refers to the ancient Chinese Zhao Gao (d. 207 BCE), who revolted after an incident in which he brought a stag to the Imperial court, claimed it was actually a horse, and saw that more of the officials sycophantically agreed with him, rather than the emperor who pointed out that the horse was actually a stag.)

Donald Keene believes that as Teika grew more important, he resented Go-Toba's peremptory use of him. In his later years, Go-Toba took issue not merely with Teika's personality, but also with his poetry, complaining of Teika's more liberal style that Teika (among other things) "by contrast, paid no attention whatsoever to the topic. For this reason in recent times even beginners have all come to be like this. It is outrageous. Only when one concentrates very hard upon a compound topic and composes a poem which centers upon the topic is the result of any interest. This modern style is sheer carelessness. It is absolutely essential to practice composing poems on compound topics in the correct way."

In any event, the precipitating events were two incidents, one in 1207 and the next in 1220. In 1207, Go-Toba decided to organize the creation of 46 landscape screens for the Saishō Shitennō Temple which he had built in 1205 (apparently "in order to enlist divine aid in the overthrow the feudal government"). Each of these screens would also have a waka on the landscape depicted, composed by a leading poet, who would compose the requisite 46, with the best poems for each landscape selected. Of course, Teika was asked to contribute, but one (on the "Wood of Ikuta", a picturesque woodland attached to the Ikuta Shrine of Settsu Province, modern-day Kobe; it was also a battlefield between the Minamoto and Taira clans) was rejected by Go-Toba; not because it was a bad poem, but because it was a "poor model", as Keene puts it. Teika, already annoyed by the minimal notice for the contest and the lack of time for composing the poems (he had to turn them in two days after he was first informed of the contest), began complaining about Go-Toba and attacking his poetic judgement, both with regard to the Shin Kokinshū and the poems selected from the screens. Nothing came of this incident, but nevertheless, the damage had been done.

The second incident took place in the second month of 1220 and is described in a preface to the two poems concerned as recorded in Teika's personal anthology, the Shū gusō; during the six-year period covering such events as Teika's banishment from Go-Toba's court and Go-Toba's participation in the Jōkyū War of 1221, Teika's diary is silent. Teika was asked to participate in a poem competition on the 13th of the second month; Teika declined, citing as a reason the anniversary of his mother's death 26 years previous, in 1194. Go-Toba and his officials sent several letters to him, strongly urging him to come, and Teika eventually gave in, arriving with only two waka. The headnote to the two poems reads:

Having been summoned to the palace for a poetry gathering on the thirteenth day of the second month in the second year of Shokyu [1220], I had begged to be excused because of a ritual defilement, it being the anniversary of my mother's death. I thought no more about it, but quite unexpectedly in the evening of the appointed day, the Archivist Iemitsu come with a letter from the ex-emperor, saying that I was not the hold back on account of the defilement, but was to come in any case. I continued to refuse, but after the ex-emperor had sent two more letters insisting on my presence, I hastily wrote down the following two poems and took them with me.

The first waka was critical of Go-Toba but otherwise fairly innocuous, but the second was quite pointed, obliquely attacking Go-Toba both for forcing Teika to attend Go-Toba's contest when Teika was memorializing his mother and also for insufficiently promoting Teika (the final line is a variation on a phrase dealing with "double griefs"):

Rōmaji
English

Michinobe no
Nohara no yanagi
Shitamoenu
Aware nageki no
Keburikurabe.

Under the willows
In the field by the roadside
The young sprouts burgeon
In competition as to which,
Alas, has most to bewail.

Go-Toba saw this attack as both ingratitude of the rankest sort and the culmination of a series of affronts, this latest being petty resentment at what Go-Toba would have seen as a flimsy pretext for attempting to get out of the poetry competition. Accordingly, he banished Teika from his court, a banishment that would last for more than a year; this feud distressed devotees of poetry.

==== Teika in the ascendancy ====
Possibly another a factor in this estrangement was politics – Teika had had the good fortune of being selected in 1209 as a poetry teacher to the new and young shōgun, Minamoto no Sanetomo; the Shogunate was a rival and superior authority to that of the Emperors and the Imperial court. It was probably to the unhappy Sanetomo that Teika addressed the prefatory essay to his didactic collection, Kindai shūka ("Superior Poems of Our Time"), and his treatise on poetry Maigetsusho ("Monthly Notes"). Go-Toba would become an enemy of the then-bedridden Teika. Fortunately for Teika, Go-Toba would be exiled by the Kamakura shogunate in 1221 for the rest of life to the Oki Islands after Go-Toba led a failed rebellion against the Shogunate (the Jōkyū War) which Go-Toba had long hated;

Teika's political fortunes improved in this period, as it was after Go-Toba's exile that Teika was appointed compiler of the ninth imperial anthology, the Shinchokusen Wakashū ("New Imperial Collection"; completed c. 1234). While it was a great honor, it was poorly received except by conservatives. According to Donald Keene, Shunzei's Daughter "declared that if it had not been compiled by Teika she would have refused even to take it into her hands." (From a letter sent to Fujiwara no Tameie, Teika's son). She and others also criticized it for apparently deliberately excluding any of the objectively excellent poems produced by the three Retired Emperors exiled in the aftermath of the Jōkyū War This absence has been variously attributed to vengefulness on the part of Teika, or simply a desire to not potentially offend the Kamakura shogunate.

In 1232, Teika was advanced at the age of 70 to the court rank of "Gon Chūnagon" (Acting Middle Counselor).

But even Teika's improved fortunes could not insulate him entirely from the various famines and disasters that wracked the country in this period, and which greatly exacberated his illnesses:

Today I had my servants dig up the garden (the north one), and plant wheat there. Even if we only grow a little, it will sustain our hunger in a bad year. Don't make fun of me! What other stratagem does a poor old man have? (Meigetsuki, 13th day of the 10th month, 1230)

Starving people collapse, and their dead bodies fill the streets. Every day the numbers increase ... The stench has gradually reached my house. Day and night alike, people go by carrying the dead in their arms, too numerous to count. (Meigetsuki, 2nd day of the 7th month, 1231)

During the later portions of his life, Teika experimented with refining his style of ushin, teaching and writing it; in addition to his critical works and the manuscripts he studied and copied out, he experimented with the then-very young and immature form of renga – "They are an amusement to me in my dotage." He died in 1241, in Kyoto, and was buried at a Buddhist temple named "Shokokuji".

=== Rival descendants ===
One of his 27 children by various women (and one of two legitimate sons), Fujiwara no Tameie (1198–1275; he is remembered as a reluctant heir, in youth inclining rather to court football at the encouragement of Go-Toba than to poetry), would carry on Teika's poetic legacy. Tameie's descendants would split into three branches: the conservative elder Nijō branch (founded by Tameie's elder son, Nijō Tameuji (1222–1286); the middle branch of the Kyōgoku founded by Fujiwara no Tamenori (1226–1279), which, before it became extinct in 1332 with the death of Fujiwara no Tamekane, merged with the Reizei at the prompting of Nun Abutsu-ni; and the younger, more liberal Reizei branch, founded by Tameie' younger son Fujiwara no Tamesuke (b. 1263) by Abutsu (d. circa 1283; a poet and a great diarist, especially remembered for her diary Isayoi Nikki ("Diary of the Waning Moon") chronicling her legal battles to get the Kamakura shogunate to stop Tameuji from disinheriting Tamesuke of the Hosokawa estate near the capital that Tameie had left Tamesuke).

It is a testament to Teika's importance that the poetic history of the next centuries is in large part a story of the battles between the rival branches; indeed, it is this rivalry that is chiefly responsible for the great number of forgeries attributed to Teika. When the Reizei lost a court case concerning possession of the Hosokawa estate Tameie had willed to Tamesuke, they were ordered to hand over the valuable manuscripts and documents inherited from Teika and Tameie over to the Nijō; they outwardly complied, but along with the few genuine documents whose existence the Nijō had already learned of, they mostly included forgeries which the Nijō had little choice but to accept. In retaliation, the Nijō manufactured a number of forgeries of their own, the better to buttress their claims.

After a period of Reizei ascendancy under Reizei Tamehide (冷泉為秀, great-grandson of Teika) (b. 1302?, d. 1372), they suffered a decline and a consequent rise in the fortunes of the Nijō, as Tamehide's son, Iametuni, became a Buddhist monk. However, the Nijō soon suffered setbacks of their own under the wastrel Nijō no Tameshige (b. 1325, d. 1385), whose promising son, Nijō no Tametō (b. 1341, d. 1381), died comparatively young, killed by a brigand.

In a further disaster for the Nijō, Tametō's son, Nijō no Tamemigi was killed by a brigand as well in 1399 (?), effectively wiping out the Nijō as an organized force. Under the grandson of Tamehide, Tanemasa (b. 1361, d. 1417), the Rezei achieved temporary victory in the time of Shōtetsu. Ironically, the once-liberal Reizei would become associated during and after the Meiji Era with the ultra-conservatives of the "Palace School".

== Poetic achievements ==
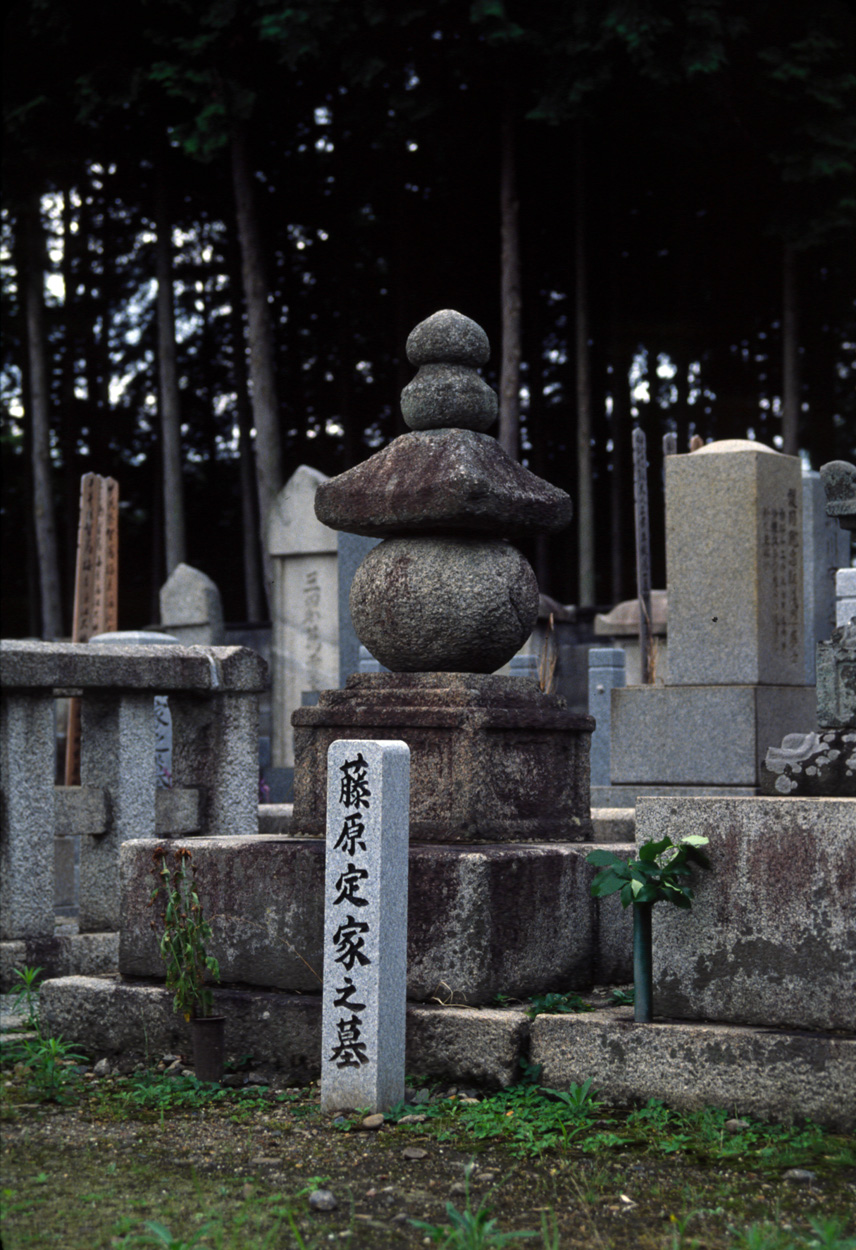
Teika's grave site.

In this art of poetry, those who speak ill of Teika should be denied the protection of the gods and Buddhas and condemned to the punishments of hell.

— Shōtetsu

Teika selected the works for the Ogura Hyakunin Isshu, an anthology of a hundred poems by a hundred poets. His Ogura Hyakunin Isshu was later thought to be a book of waka theory in which all types of ideal waka and all techniques were laid out; disputes over specific style and whether to be conservative or liberal that divided his descendants into a number of feuding schools/clans like the Reizei, Kyōgoku, and Nijō.

Teika made many manuscript copies of Japanese classics, including such landmarks of Japanese literature as The Tale of Genji, The Tales of Ise and the Kokinshū anthology. In his days, the ancient Japanese pronunciations were lost or difficult to understand, rendering the orthography of kana confused and uncertain. Teika researched old documents and recovered the earlier system of deciding between interpretations of kana, and developed a systematic orthography which was used until the modern Meiji period. He applied his kana system to his manuscripts, which were known for their accuracy and general high quality and called Teika bon ("Teika text"). Using his method he was able to document the accurate pronunciation of earlier waka like the ones in the Kokin Wakashū. His manuscripts were also appreciated for his eponymous distinct and bold style of calligraphy. The Adobe font "Kazuraki SPN", released in 2009, is based upon the calligraphic style of Fujiwara Teika.

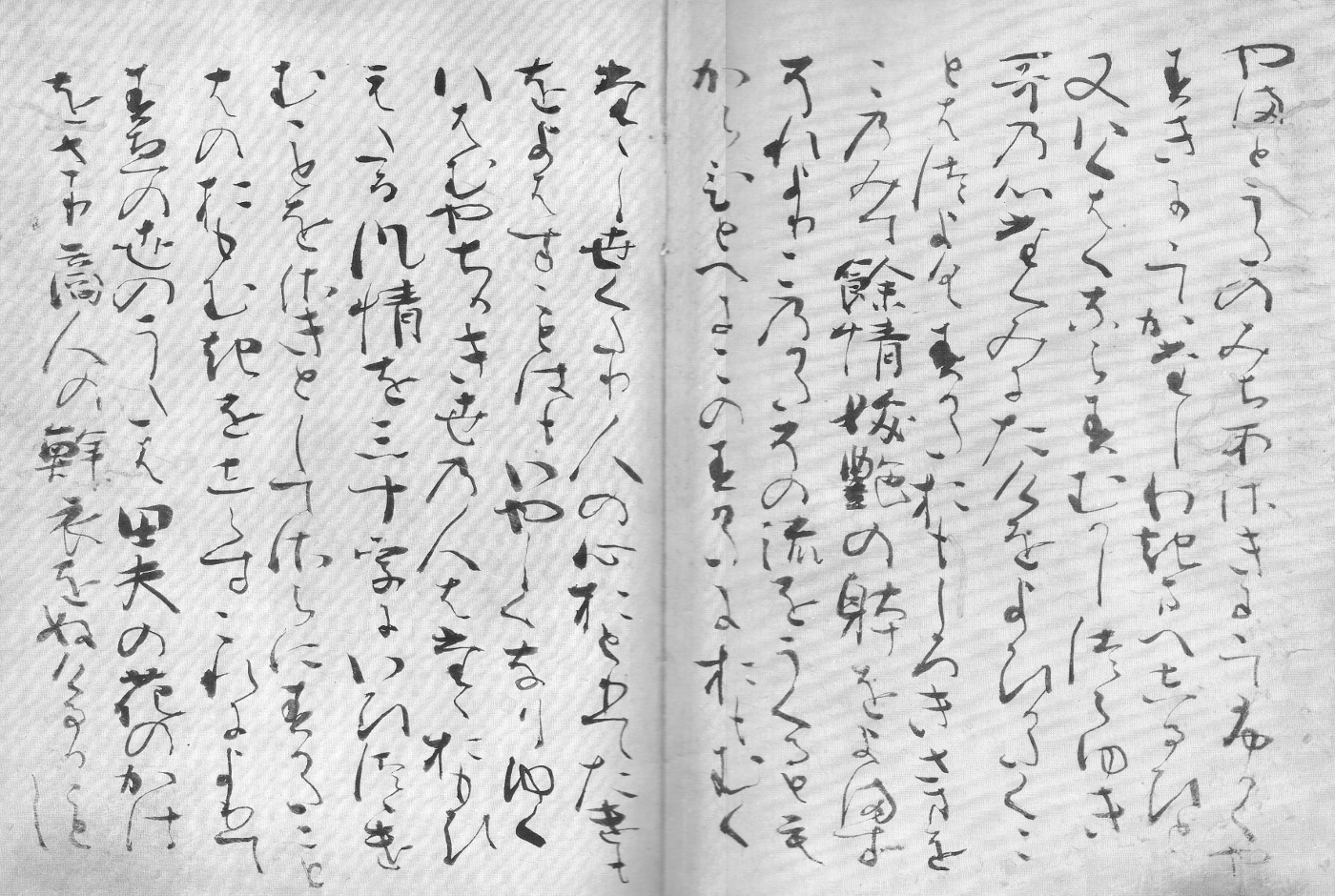
A manuscript in Teika's hand of "Superior Poems of our Time", showing his calligraphic style.

Teika is also remembered, like his father, as being something of an innovator – the Encyclopædia Britannica says:

Teika employed traditional language in startling new ways, showing that the prescriptive ideal of "old diction, new treatment" [kotoba furuku, kokoro atarashi] inherited from Shunzei might accommodate innovation and experimentation as well as ensure the preservation of the language and styles of the classical past.

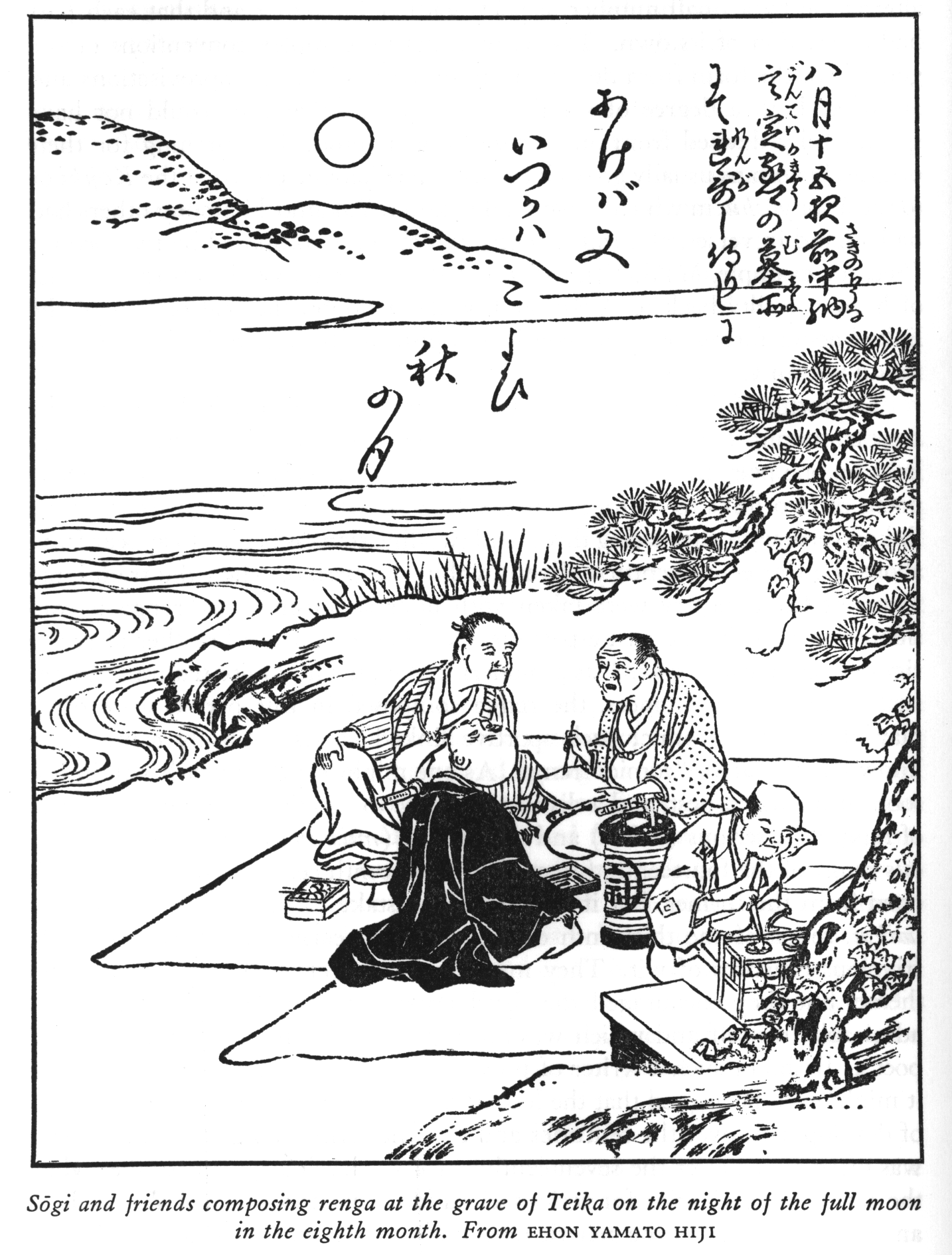
Sōgi and his friends honor Teika's grave with a poetry party.

The "old diction" here are phrases and words from the "Three Collections": the Kokinshū, the Gosen Wakashū, and the Shūi Wakashū, but not much older than that (for instance, the diction of the Man'yōshū was considered too old). Teika wrote in his Maigetsusho that the best poems were spontaneous and original, but nevertheless traditional:

But such a notion is quite erroneous. For if we were to call such verses as that superior, then any poem at all we might write could be a fine one. No, first the powers of invention must be freed by reciting endless possibilities over and over to oneself. Then, suddenly and spontaneously, from among all the lines one is composing, may emerge a poem whose treatment of the topic is different from the common run, a verse that is somehow superior to the rest. It is full of poetic feeling, lofty in cadence, skillful, with resonances above and beyond the words themselves. It is dignified in effect, its phrasing original, yet smooth and gentle. It is interesting, suffused with an atmosphere subtle yet clear. It is richly evocative, its emotion not tense and nervous but sensible from the appropriateness of the imagery. Such a poem is not to be composed by conscious effort, but if a man will only persist in unremitting practice, he may produce one spontaneously.

The following is an example of how Teika used old and classic imagery such as Takasago and Onoe, as well as pine and cherry trees, in fresh ways:

Japanese
Rōmaji
English

高砂の
松とみやこに
ことづてよ
をのへのさくら
いまさかり也

Takasago no
Matsu to miyako ni
Kotozute yo
Onoe no sakura
Ima sakari nari.

Tell it in the capital:
That like the steadfast pine trees
On Takasago's sands,
At Onoe, the cherries on the hills
yet wait in the fullness of their bloom.

His poems were described as remarkable for their elegance and exemplars of Teika's ideals, in his early and later years (respectively; Teika considerably modified his personal beliefs during his 40s, after the death of Shunzei, and simplified his style of composition), of the styles of yoen – one of the ten orthodox styles Teika defined and defended in his poetic criticism, with some of the others being the onihishigitei ("demon-quelling force") style, the style of sabi or "loneliness" (closely related to mono no aware), the style of yūgen, or "mystery and depth"; the yoen style was concerned with "ethereal beauty", and ushin ("deep feeling" or "conviction of feeling". This shift in style from yoen to ushin was intended to achieve a certain sort of makoto, or integrity; Teika sometimes referred to his aim as ushin ("deep feeling"), which confusingly was also the name of one of the ten styles. The yoen style was one of the most popular in his time due in no small part to Teika's of it (yoen had first been described by Fujiwara no Mototoshi in the 1150s, but had been only marginally successful); years later, the Symbolists would admire and emulate (to a degree) his use of language to evoke atmosphere in his brief poems in the yoen style. An excellent example (and one later chosen for an Imperial anthology) is the first poem below:

Japanese
Rōmaji
English

駒とめて
袖うちはらふ
かげもなし
佐野のわたりの
雪の夕暮

Koma tomete
Sode uchiharau
Kage mo nashi
Sano no watari no
Yuki no yūgure.

There is no shelter
where I can rest my weary horse,
and brush my laden sleeves:
the Sano Ford and its fields
spread over with twilight in the snow.

こぬ人を
まつほの浦の
夕なぎに
焼くやもしほの
身もこがれつつ

Konu hito o
Matsuho no ura no
Yunagi ni
Yaku ya moshio no
Mi mo kogare tsutsu.

Like the salt sea-weed,
Burning in the evening calm.
On Matsuo's shore,
All my being is aflame,
Awaiting her who does not come.

しかばかり
契りし中も
かはりける
此世に人を
たのみけるかな

Shika bakari
Chigirishi naka mo
Kawarikeru
Kono yo ni hito o
Tanomikeru kana.

So strong were
Our pledges, yet between us
All has changed;
In this world, in her
Did I put my trust...

== Partial bibliography ==
- Shūi gusō (拾遺愚草); Teika's personal anthology which includes over 3500 poems selected by himself. The two poems which offended Retired Emperor Go-Toba so much and caused the rift between Teika and him are preserved here only.
- Meigetsuki (明月記; "The Record of the Clear Moon"; sometimes called "Diary of the Clear Moon" or possibly "Chronicle of the Bright Moon"; as the second translation suggests, this was a diary Teika kept in classical Chinese between the ages of approximately 18 (in 1180) to just before his death, around 1241; the entries for 1180 and 1181 may have been written when Teika was an old man, but the bulk of the diary covers the 47 years between 1188 and 1235. As its comprehensiveness might suggest, it is an extremely valuable resource for understanding the court and Teika's place in the Imperial court, even despite its incompleteness—available extant versions consist of 56 scrolls (the Reizei family possesses in its family library holographs of 56 and copies of two more), while scholars estimate that the original consisted of over 180 scrolls.) Among its many interesting passages (some quoted previously) about Teika's career and life is a passage from the ninth month of 1180 about Teika's indifference to political or military advancement, in which he aristocratically remarked that "Reports of disturbances and punitive expeditions fill one's ears, but I pay them no attention. The red banners and the expeditions against the traitors are no concern of mine." (Here, "red banners" probably refers to the Imperial standard; the last line is possibly a reference to a poem by Po Chu-i in which he tells of how he has been effectively exiled and passes his time playing Go).
- Hyakunin isshu (百人一首, c. 1235 "Single Poems by One Hundred Poets"; this collection became the foundation of the modern Japanese New Year game karuta.)
- Hyakunin Shūka (百人秀歌, 1229–1236?; a 101-poem anthology arranged at the request of Utsunomiya Yoritsuna to be copied onto 101 strips of paper and pasted onto the walls of his villa; it has 97 poems in common with Hyakunin isshu, suggesting that perhaps it is a misidentified and variant version of the Isshu.)
- Shoji hyakushu (正治百首, 1200; "Hundred-Poem Sequence of the Shoji era")
- Gotoba-in Kumano Gokō Ki (熊野御幸記, 1201; "The Visit of the Cloistered Emperor to Kumano"). Portion of Meigetsuki which Teika wrote about a trip to Kumano he took with Go-Toba and Michichika; like his other diary, it is written in classical Chinese, except for the wakas along the way to the shrines there that Go-Toba was so devoted to that this trip was but one of more than thirty. Teika seems not to have enjoyed the trip; his diary often records concern over his health and matters of decorum such as the proper clothes to wear.
- Eiga taigai or Eika no Taigai (詠歌大概, c. 1216, 1222?; "Essentials of Poetic Composition"). Besides normal advice and criticism of poetry such as pedantic rules on honkadori – poems used as a base in honkadori should always be old poems and from either the Kokinshū, Shūi Wakashū, or the Gosen Wakashū with no more than two and a half lines borrowed from the originals; similarly, borrowed elements were to be moved within the new poem and the new poem should have a different theme), Teika also tellingly recommends certain classic works for aspiring poets to study: the Tales of Ise, Sanjurokkasen (or "Poems of the Thirty-Six Immortals") and the first two portions of The Collected Works of Po Chü-i. Portions of the Eiga taigai have been translated into English
- Kindai shūka (近代秀歌, c. 1209; "Superior Poems of Our Time"; a collection of poems Teika felt to be excellent models, with a preface dealing with his critical philosophy, sent to Sanetomo to instruct him in how his poems should emulate the great ancient Japanese poets – teaching by example. This sequence was constructed when he was 47, after the death of Shunzei, which depressed Teika, as evidenced by his writing in the Kindai shūka that he had "forgotten the color of the followers of words; the well-springs of inspiration have run dry.")
- Maigetsusho (毎月抄, c. 1219; "Monthly Notes"; an epistle of corrections of one hundred poems, sent to a student of Teika's. Besides the corrections, it bore a preface which is a major source of information regarding Teika's view on the aesthetics of poetry; Shōtetsu states that it was sent to Minamoto no Sanetomo; Ton'a holds rather that it had been sent to the "Kinugasa Great Inner Minister", or Fujiwara no Ieyoshi.) Besides Brower's English translation, the Maigetsusho was also translated to French, Italian and Hungarian.
- Matsuranomiya monogatari (松浦宮物語 "The Tale of the Matsura Palace"; an experimental novel believed to be written by Teika, though Teika's manuscript claims that he was merely copying it.)
- Teika hachidai sho (定家八代抄; Anthology of 1811 poems from the first 8 Imperial anthologies.)
- Shuka no daitai (秀歌大体; "A Basic Canon of Superior Poems")
- Teika Jittai (定家十体, 1207–1213; an anthology of 286 poems, chiefly derived from the Shin Kokinshū; long believed a forgery, but some modern scholars contend that it is a genuine work.)

== See also ==
- Shikishi
- Reizei family

== Bibliography ==
- Brower, Robert H. (1972), "'Ex-Emperor Go-Toba's Secret Teachings': Go-Toba no in Gokuden" (PDF), Harvard Journal of Asiatic Studies, vol. 32, pp. 5–70, archived from the original (PDF) on March 3, 2016
- Brower, Robert H. (1978), Translation of Fujiwara Teika's Hundred-Poem Sequence of the Shoji Era, 1200, Sophia University, ASIN B0006E39K8
- Brower, Robert H. (1985), "Fujiwara Teika's Maigetsusho" (PDF), Monumenta Nipponica, vol. 40, no. 4, pp. 399–425, archived from the original (PDF) on March 3, 2016
- Bundy 1990, "Poetic Apprenticeship: Fujiwara Teika's Shogaku Hyakushu"
- Carter, Steven D. (1997), Unforgotten Dreams: Poems by the Zen Monk Shōtetsu, Columbia University Press, ISBN 0-231-10576-2
- Keene, Donald (1989), Travelers of a Hundred Ages: The Japanese as Revealed Through 1,000 Years of Diaries, Henry Holt and Company, ISBN 0-8050-1655-4
- Keene, Donald (1999), Seeds in the Heart: Japanese Literature from Earliest Times to the Late Sixteenth Century (PDF), Columbia University Press, ISBN 0-231-11441-9
- Miner, Earl; Brower, Robert H. (1961), Japanese Court Poetry, Stanford University Press, ISBN 0-8047-1524-6
- Miner, Earl (1968), An Introduction to Japanese Court Poetry, Stanford University Press, ISBN 0-8047-0636-0
- Mostow, Joshua S., ed. (1996). Pictures of the Heart: The Hyakunin Isshu in Word and Image. Honolulu: University of Hawaii Press.
- Nussbaum, Louis-Frédéric and Käthe Roth. (2005). Japan encyclopedia. Cambridge: Harvard University Press. ISBN 978-0-674-01753-5; OCLC 58053128
