= Chokusen wakashū =

21 anthologies of Japanese waka poetry

The chokusen wakashū (勅撰和歌集), also shortened to chokusenshū (勅撰集), were imperially-commissioned Japanese anthologies of waka poetry. They numbered 21 in total (called nijūichidaishū).

== Overview ==
The term chokusen wakashū (hereafter shortened to chokusenshū) refers to anthologies of waka poetry compiled and presented for inspection on the order of either a reigning emperor of Japan, or a retired or cloistered emperor. The first was the Kokin Wakashū compiled at the beginning of the tenth century and the last was the Shinshoku Kokin Wakashū compiled in the first half of the fifteenth century, with 21 in total.

The first three chokusenshū are referred to as the sandaishū, the first eight (through the Shin-Kokin Wakashū) as the hachidaishū, the ninth (the Shin Chokusen Wakashū) through the 21st called the jūsandaishū, and the whole group of 21 as the nijūichidaishū. The total number of poems contained in the 21 collections comes to about 33,700.

Two collections were compiled on the orders of emperors but are not included in this list. The first is the Shoku-Shika Wakashū (compiled in the late 12th century by Fujiwara no Kiyosuke), which was commissioned by Emperor Nijō, but the emperor died before it could be presented to him, and so it was never formally given the title of chokusenshū. The second is the Shin'yō Wakashū, a so-called quasi-chokusenshū (準勅撰和歌集, jun-chokusen-wakashū), which was compiled at the end of the 14th century at the Southern Court.

== Nijūichidaishū ==
The Nijūichidaishū (二十一代集, Collections of the Twenty-One Eras) are Japan's twenty one imperial collections (chokusenshū) of waka poetry written by noblemen. The following texts listed in chronological order constitute the Nijūichidaishū:

The Hachidaishū are the first eight collections, in which the first three collections are the Sandaishū. The Sandaishū provided both the language and organizational principles for the rest of the anthologies thereafter. They are:

- Kokin Wakashū
- Gosen Wakashū
- Shūi Wakashū
- Goshūi Wakashū
- Kin'yō Wakashū
- Shika Wakashū
- Senzai Wakashū
- Shin Kokin Wakashū

The Jūsandaishū are the later thirteen collections. They are:

- Shinchokusen Wakashū
- Shokugosen Wakashū
- Shokukokin Wakashū
- Shokushūi Wakashū
- Shingosen Wakashū
- Gyokuyō Wakashū
- Shokusenzai Wakashū
- Shokugoshūi Wakashū
- Fūga Wakashū
- Shinsenzai Wakashū
- Shinshūi Wakashū
- Shingoshūi Wakashū
- Shinshokukokin Wakashū

Note that the Shin'yō Wakashū—although an imperial anthology of Japanese poetry—is not included in the list of twenty-one collections.

== Commissioners and compilers ==
The compilers of the first several chokusenshū were acting under direct orders of the reigning emperor, but during the period of cloistered rule (or rather the later Heian period and the Kamakura period) it was more common for the anthologies to be commissioned by the retired emperor who was in charge of the court (the Daijō Tennō).

With the exceptions of the Shūi Wakashū and the Fūga Wakashū, the commissioner would give the order to between one and five compilers to select poems, arrange them into books by topic, arrange the poems within each book and make orthographic decisions. When the compilation was completed, the collection would be presented to the commissioner for inspection. Occasionally the commissioner would order changes to be made, resulting in, for example, the three variant texts of the Kin'yō Wakashū. The Shin-Kokin Wakashū has an unusual history that after being inspected and approved, later changes were made personally by the commissioner.

The last four chokusenshū were compiled during a period of decline for the imperial house, and were instead commissioned and completed under the auspices of the Ashikaga shōguns. Ashikaga Yoshimasa ordered a further collection, which Asukai Masachika (飛鳥井雅親) began compiling, but the work was abandoned during the Ōnin War.

== Works cited ==
- Fujihira, Haruo (1994). "Chokusen wakashū". Encyclopedia Nipponica (in Japanese). Shogakukan.
