= Fujiwara no Tameie =

Japanese poet and poetry compiler

- 藤原 為家
- Born: 1198
- Died: 1275 (aged 76–77)
- Spouse: Abutsu-ni
- Children: Nijō Tameuji, Kyōgoku Tamenori and Reizei Tamesuke
- Writing career
- Notable work: Anthology of Poetry

Fujiwara no Tameie (藤原 為家; 1198-1275) was a Japanese poet and compiler of Imperial anthologies of poems.

Tameie was the second son of poet Teika and married Abutsu-ni. He was the central figure in a circle of Japanese poets after the Jōkyū War in 1221. His three sons were Nijō Tameuji, Kyōgoku Tamenori and Reizei Tamesuke. They each established rival families of poets—the Nijō, the Kyōgoku and the Reizei.

Starting in 1250, Tameie was among those who held the ritsuryō office of chief administrator of the Ministry of Taxation (民部卿, Minbu-kyō). In 1256, he abandoned public life to become a Buddhist monk, taking the name Minbukyō-nyūdō.

== Biography ==
The poet Fujiwara no Tameie was born in 1198. He was a member of the Nagaie lineage of the Northern Branch of the Fujiwara clan, the second son of Acting Middle Counsellor Fujiwara no Teika. His mother was a daughter of Great Minister of the Centre Fujiwara no Sanemune.

Peerage was conferred on the young Tameie at the age of five, by Japanese reckoning, in Kennin 2 (1202). The same year, he accompanied his father on a visit to Emperor Go-Toba and the crown prince (the later Emperor Juntoku).

He died on the first day of the fifth month of Kenji 1, or 27 May 1275 in the Julian calendar. He was 78 years old by Japanese reckoning.

== Names ==
Tameie's infanthood name was Mimyō (三名). His art name was Naka-no-in (中院), and upon entering religious orders he took the dharma name Yūgaku (融覚).

== Selected work ==
Tameie's published writings encompass 23 works in 28 publications in 1 language and 124 library holdings.

- 2002 — Anthology of Poetry (藤原為家全歌集, Fujiwara Tameie zenkashū; OCLC 050635854)
