= Thirty-Six Immortal Women Poets =

Canon of Japanese poets of the Heian and Kamakura periods

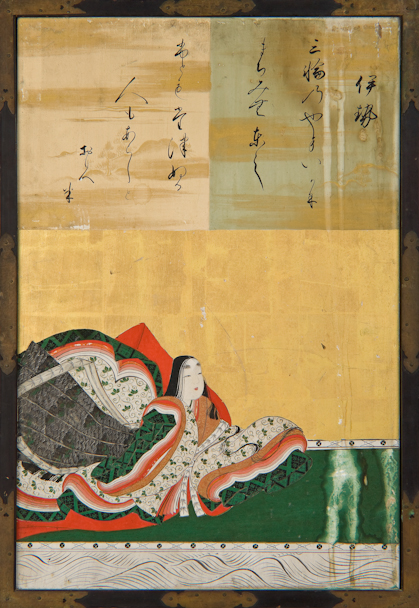
Lady Ise, painting by Kanō Tan’yū

The Thirty-Six Immortal Women Poets (女房三十六歌仙, Nyōbō Sanjūrokkasen) is a canon of Japanese poets who were anthologized in the middle Kamakura period. The compiler and exact date of the canon's construction is unknown, but its reference is subsequently noted in the Gunsho Ruijū, volume 13.

Five of the 36, Ono no Komachi, Lady Ise, Nakatsukasa, Saigū no Nyōgo and Kodai no Kimi also appeared in an earlier anthology with the similar title Thirty-Six Immortals of Poetry which dates from 1113 (late Heian Period). The poet Fujiwara no Kintō chose this original selection that preceded the Thirty-Six Immortal Women Poets.

These five women poets from the original publication were included in the Thirty-Six Immortal Women Poets and canonized along with others from the Heian and Kamakura eras.

== Role of women's court poetry in Heian-era Japan ==
The women canonized in this compilation are typically noblewomen associated with the imperial court, for example, Lady Ise, consort to Emperor Uda, Inpumon'in no Tayū (literally the Attendant to Empress Inpu), Michitsuna no haha (literally, Michitsuna's mother), Fujiwara no Shunzei no Musume (Literally Shunzei Fujiwara's daughter).

Scholars Esperanza Ramirez-Christensen and Yumiko Watanabe have suggested that the lack of a proper name or singular identity, symbolising broader structural power relations that marginalised court women, may have contributed to their autobiographic impulse to craft poetry.

Pre-modern Japanese literature professor Roselee Bundy traces the contribution to women's court poetry reaching its zenith in the mid Heian period as aesthetic communal events, before gradual professionalization of the genre began to exclude women's voices beginning in the Kamakura period.

== List of poets ==
【1】	【2】	左	【3】		右	【4】
○		Ono no Komachi 小野小町	○	○	Shikishi Naishinnō 式子内親王	○
○		Lady Ise 伊勢	○		Kunai-kyō 宮内卿	○
○		Nakatsukasa 中務		○	Suō no Naishi 周防内侍（平仲子）	
○		Saigū no Nyōgo (Kishi Joō) 斎宮女御			Fujiwara no Toshinari no Musume 俊成卿女	○
		Ukon 右近	○	○	Taikenmon'in no Horikawa 待賢門院堀河	
	○	Fujiwara no Michitsuna no Haha 右大将道綱母	○		Gishūmon'in no Tango 宜秋門院丹後	
	○	Uma no Naishi 馬内侍			Kayōmon'in no Echizen 嘉陽門院越前	
	○	Akazome Emon 赤染衛門	○	○	Nijōin no Sanuki 二条院讃岐	
	○	Izumi Shikibu 和泉式部	○		Kojijū 小侍従	
○		Kodai no Kimi 三条院女蔵人左近（小大君）			Go-Toba-in no Shimotsuke 後鳥羽院下野	
	○	Murasaki Shikibu 紫式部	○		Ben no Naishi 弁内侍	
		Koshikibu no Naishi 小式部内侍	○		Gofukakusa-in no shōshō no naishi 少将内侍	
	○	Ise no Taifu 伊勢大輔	○	○	Inpumon'in no Tayū 殷富門院大輔	
	○	Sei Shōnagon 清少納言	○		Tsuchimikado'in no Kosaishō 土御門院小宰相	
		Daini no Sanmi 大弐三位（藤原賢子）	○		Hachijō-in Takakura 八条院高倉	○
		Takashina no Kishi 高内侍（儀同三司母）	○		Fujiwara no Chikako 後嵯峨院中納言典侍（典侍藤原親子）	
		Yūshi Naishinnō-ke no Kii 一宮紀伊（祐子内親王家紀伊）	○		Shikikenmon'in no Mikushige 式乾門院御匣	
	○	Sagami 相模	○		Sōhekimon'in no Shōshō 璧門院少将	○

- 【1】：Selected in the Thirty-Six Immortals of Poetry by Fujiwara no Kintō (1113).
- 【2】：Selected in the Late Classical Thirty-Six Immortals of Poetry by Fujiwara no Norikane in the late Heian period.
- 【3】：Selected in the Ogura Hyakunin Isshu by Fujiwara no Teika in the early Kamakura period.
- 【4】：Selected in the New Thirty-Six Immortals of Poetry by unknown compilers in the Kamakura period

== Woodblock prints of the Thirty-Six Immortal Women Poets by Chōbunsai Eishi ==
In 1801 the ukiyo-e painter Chōbunsai Eishi made a series of paintings to depict the thirty-six immortal women poets to accompany the calligraphy of each poet's verse, as produced by 36 girls who were students of Hanagata Giryu's (花形義融) calligraphy school "Hanagata Shodo". The album, reproduced with woodblock printing was intended to publicize the school. The 36 portraits are divided into a "left" (左) team and a "right" (右) team where the left team comprised poets who lived between the ninth and eleventh centuries, and the right team was made up of those poets that lived in the twelfth and thirteenth centuries.

The teams square off in a pair-competition on each spread, which was a practice dating from the Heian period imperial court in the late ninth century. The Smithsonian researcher Andrew J. Pekarik compared this competitive social art form to poetry slams at the Nuyorican Poets Café in the 1990s.

The album was published by Nishimura Yohachi with an album binding (gajōsō) and also featured a woodblock printed cover designed by Hokusai. The block carvers were Yamaguchi Matsugorō (山口松五郎) and Yamaguchi Seizō (山口清蔵).

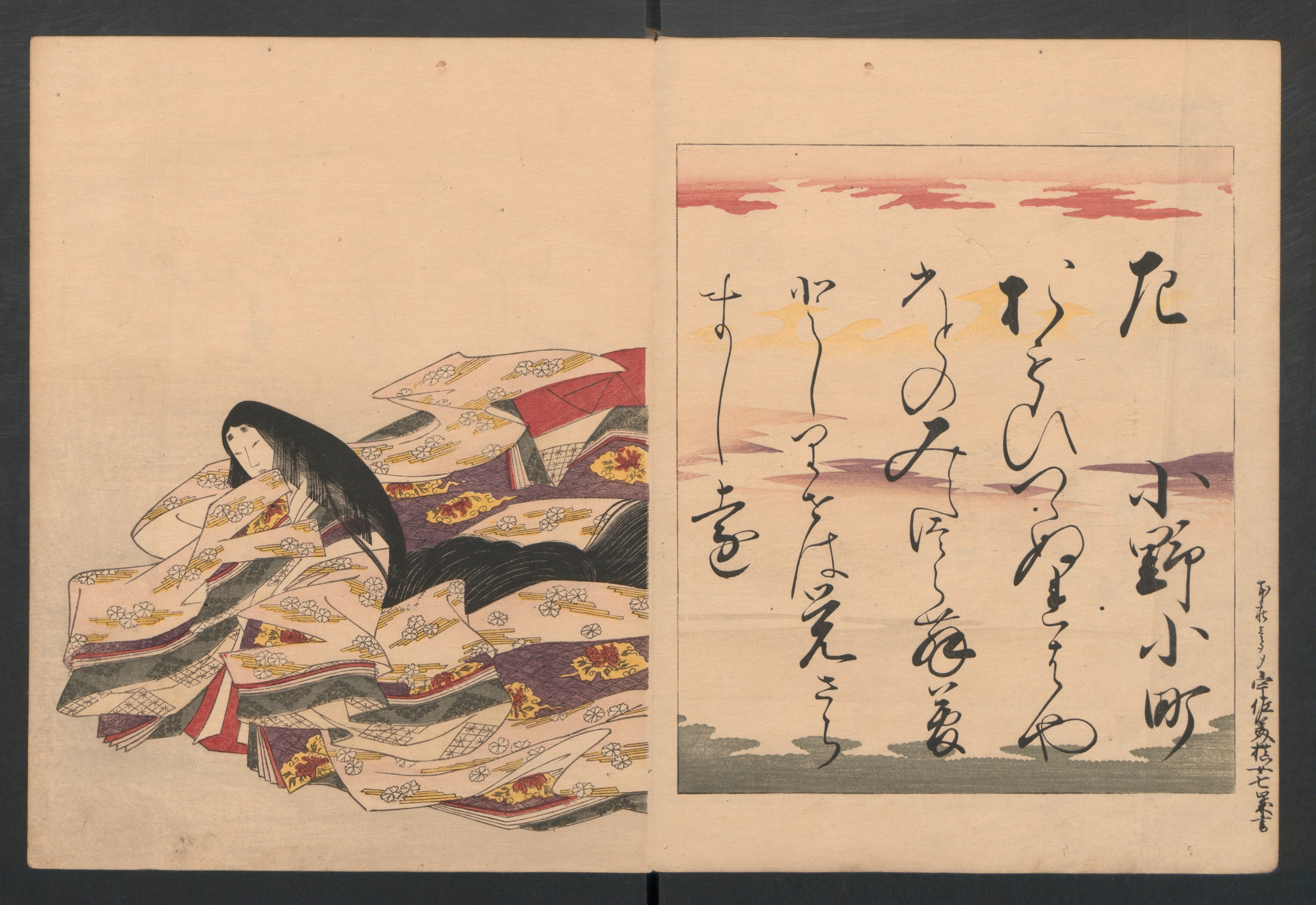
1. Ono no Komachi 小野小町

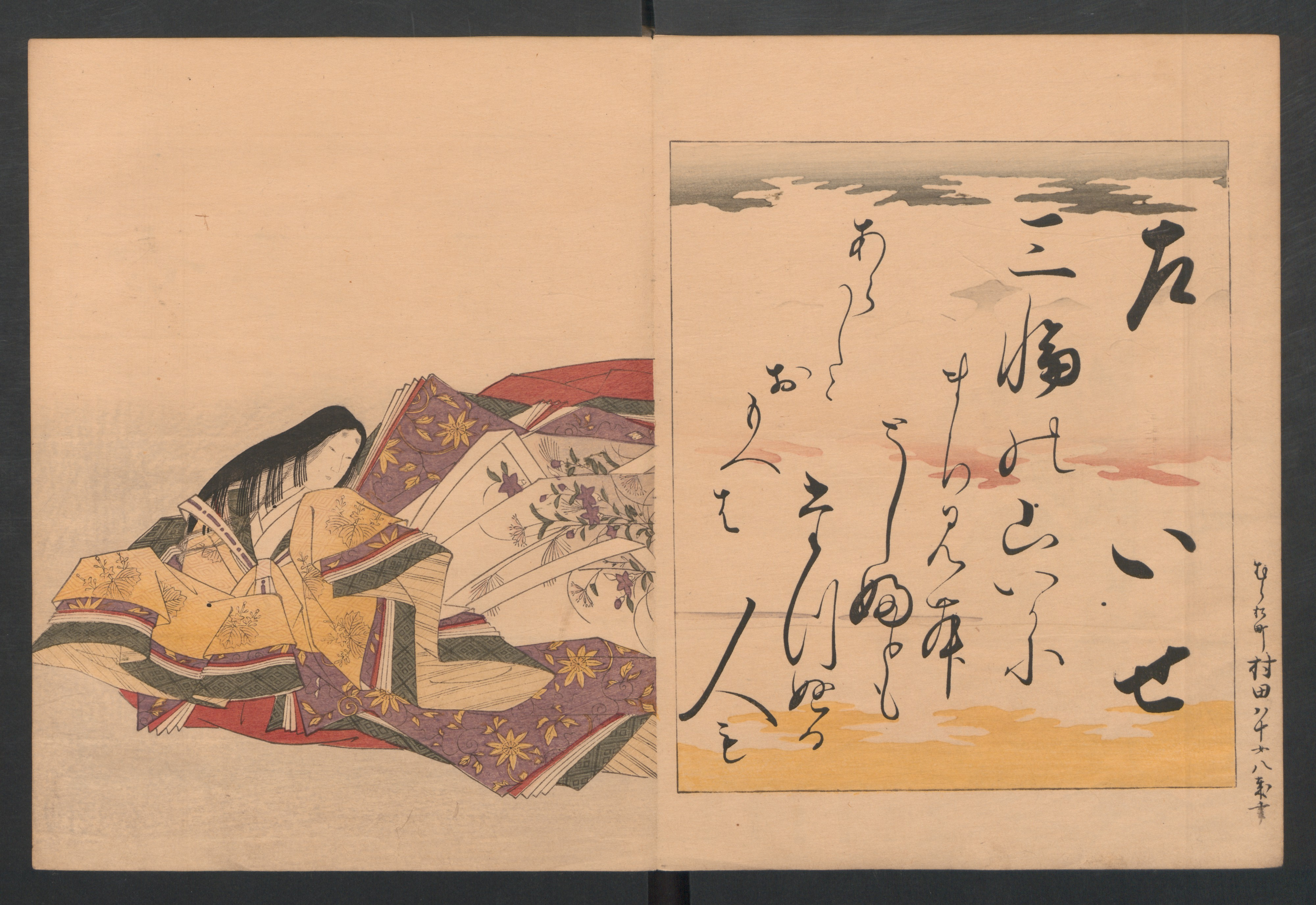
2. Lady Ise 伊勢

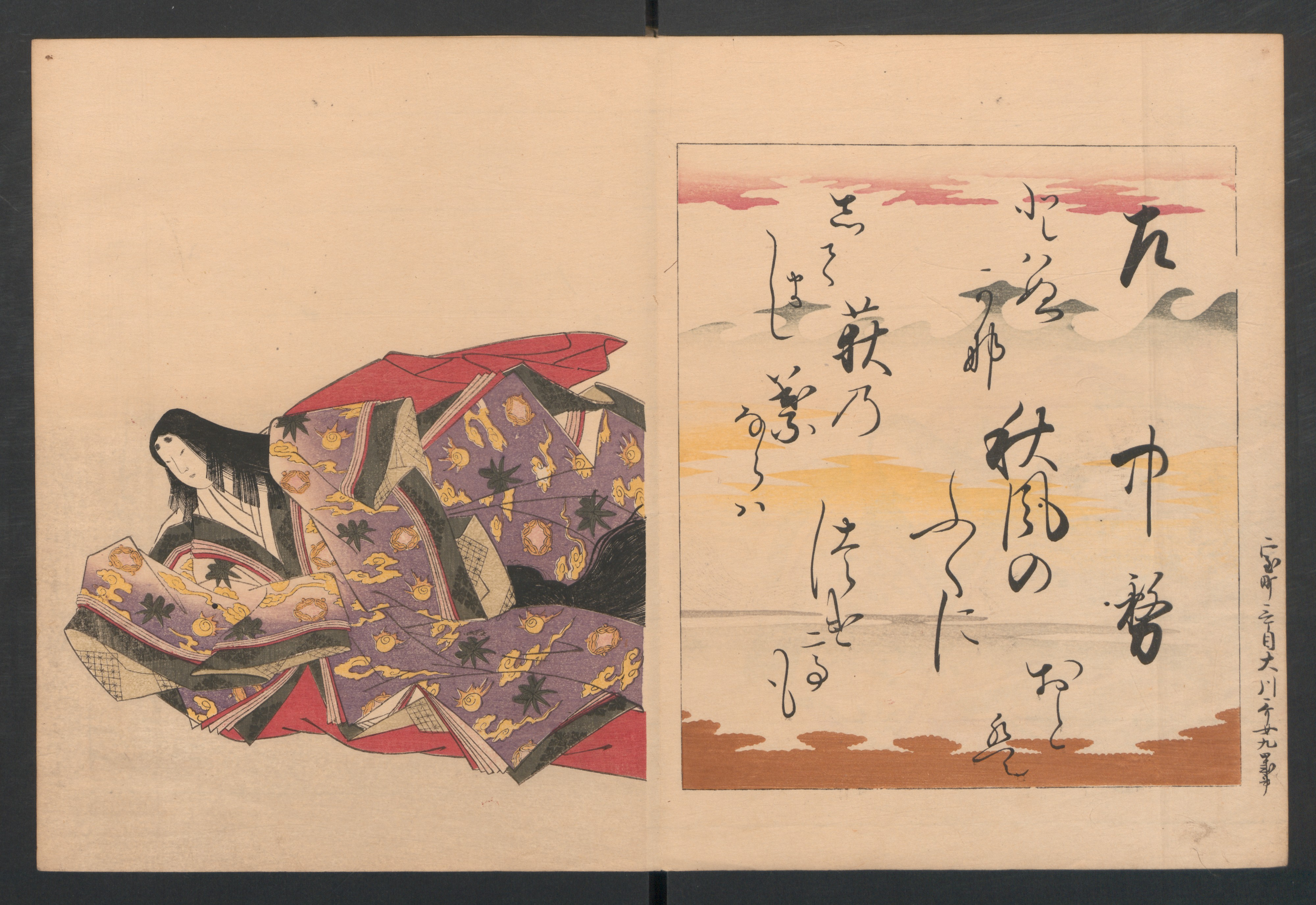
Nakatsukasa 中務

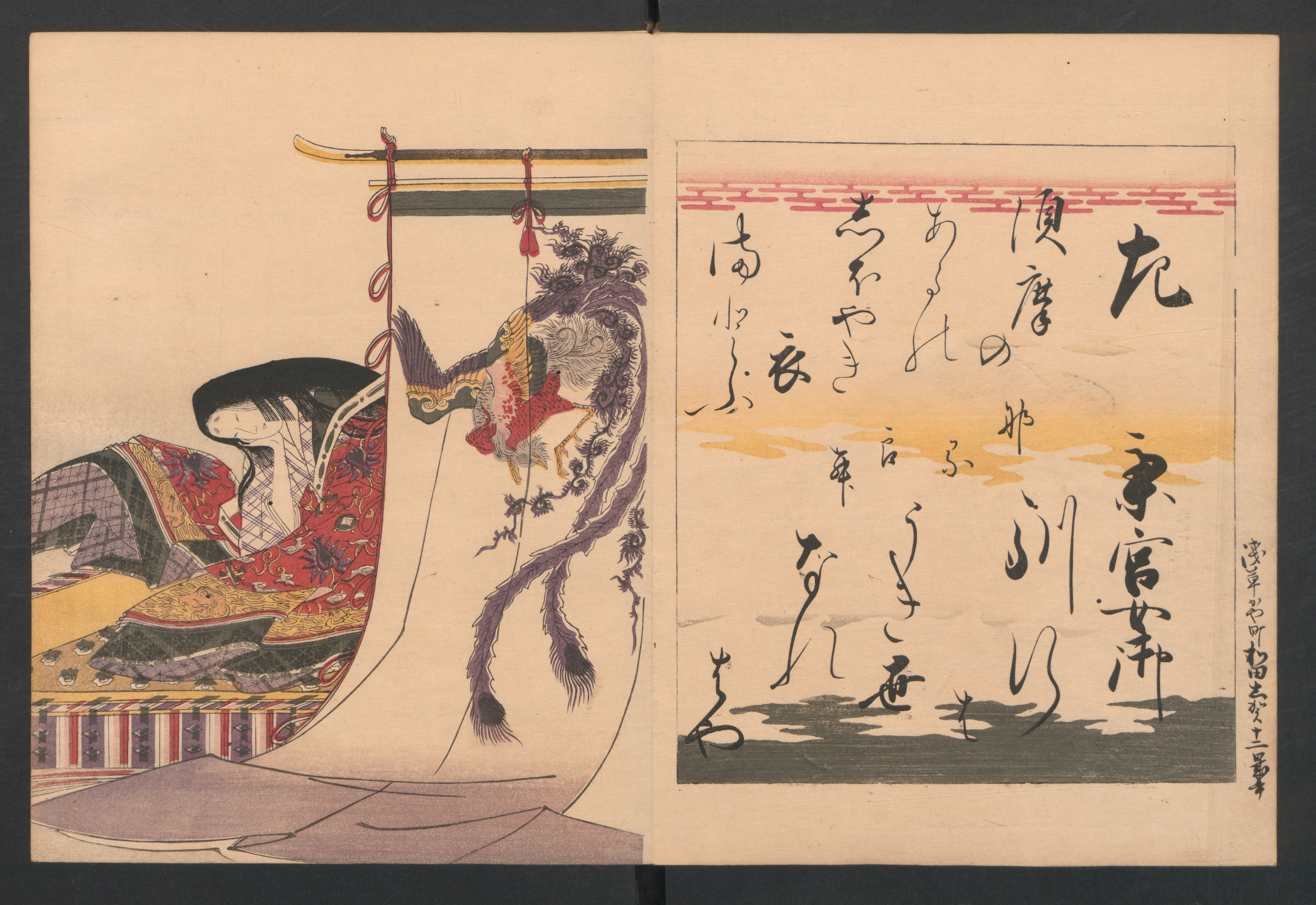
4. Saigū no Nyōgo (Kishi Joō) 斎宮女御

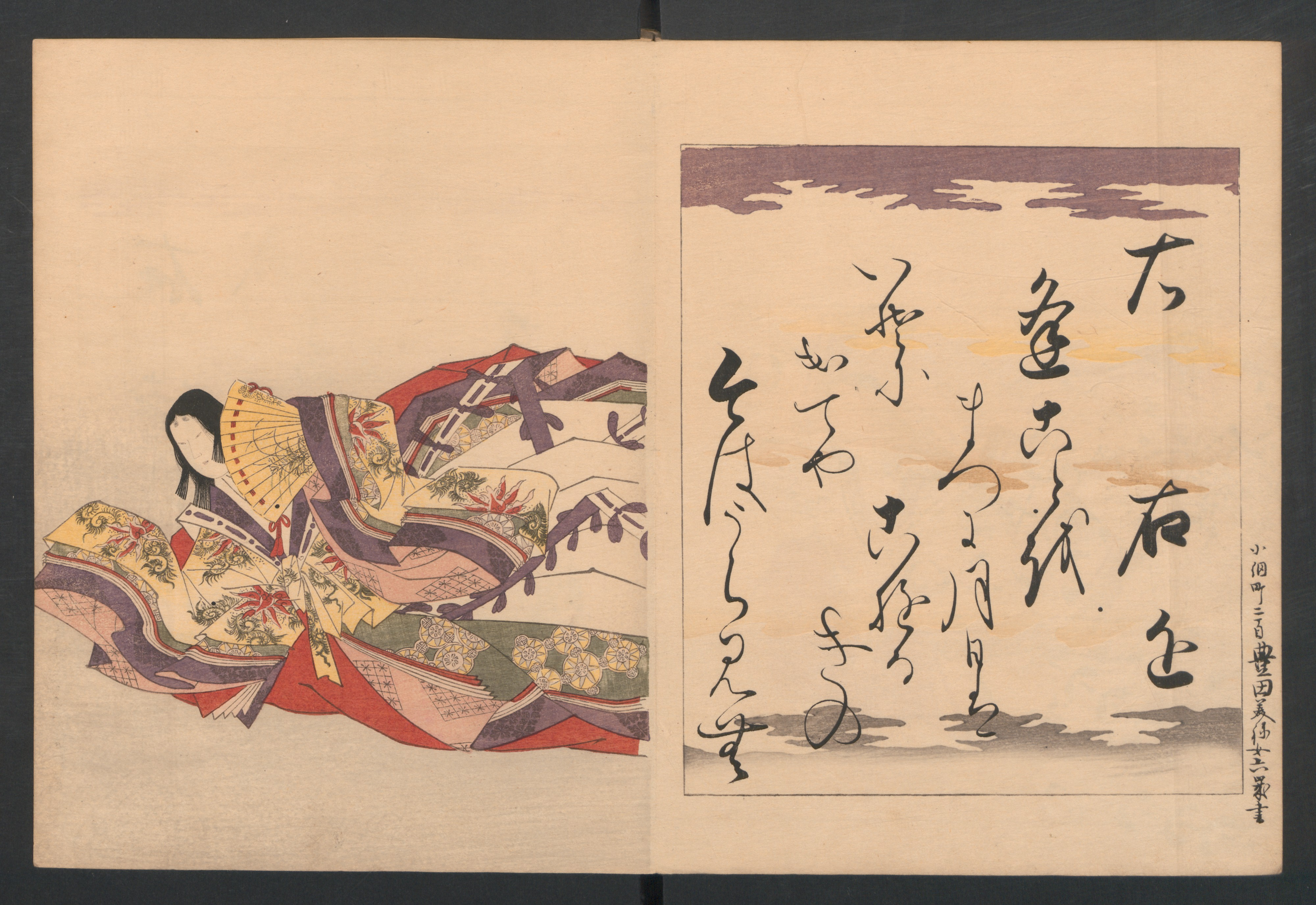
5. Ukon 右近

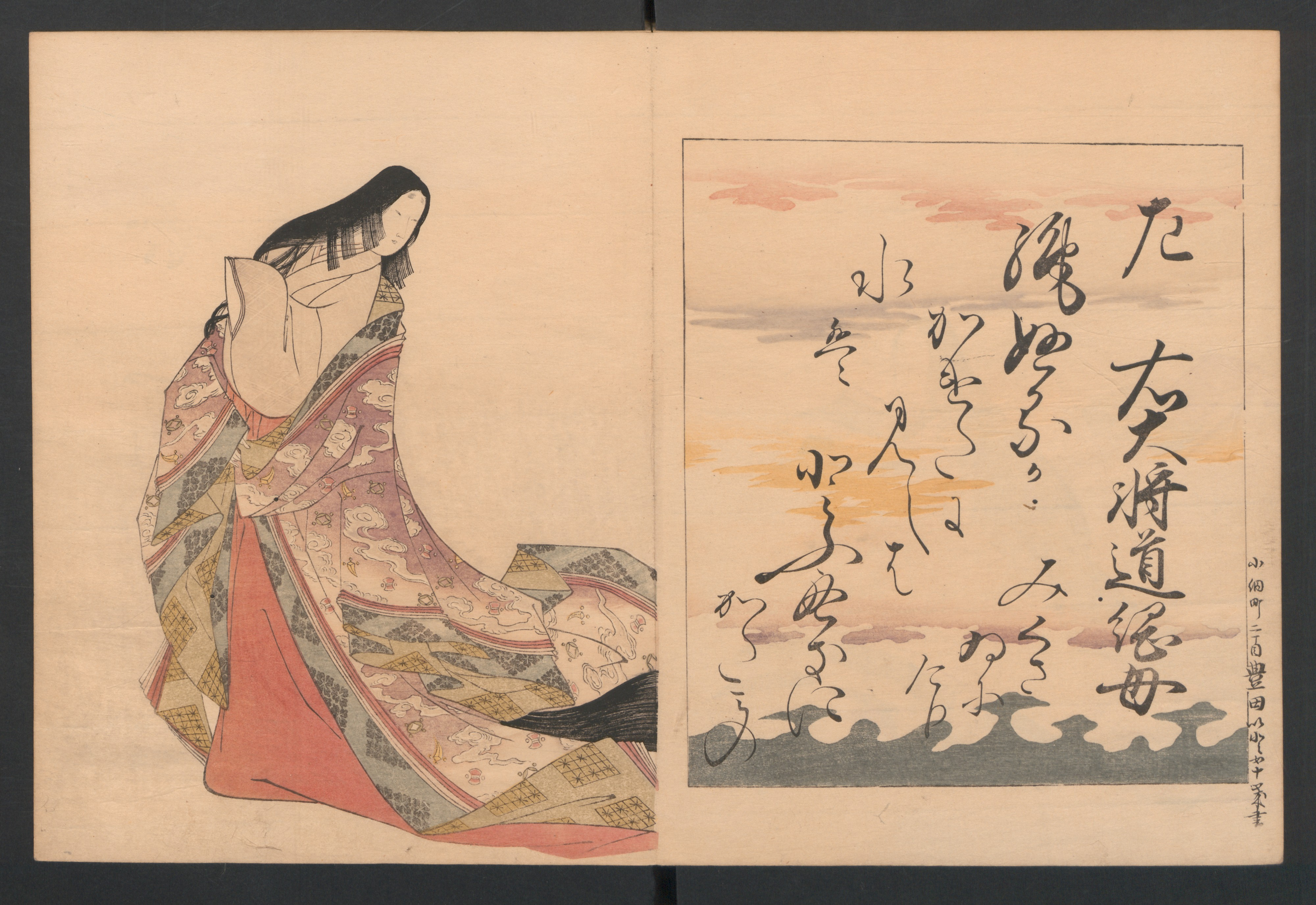
6. Fujiwara no Michitsuna no Haha 右大将道綱母

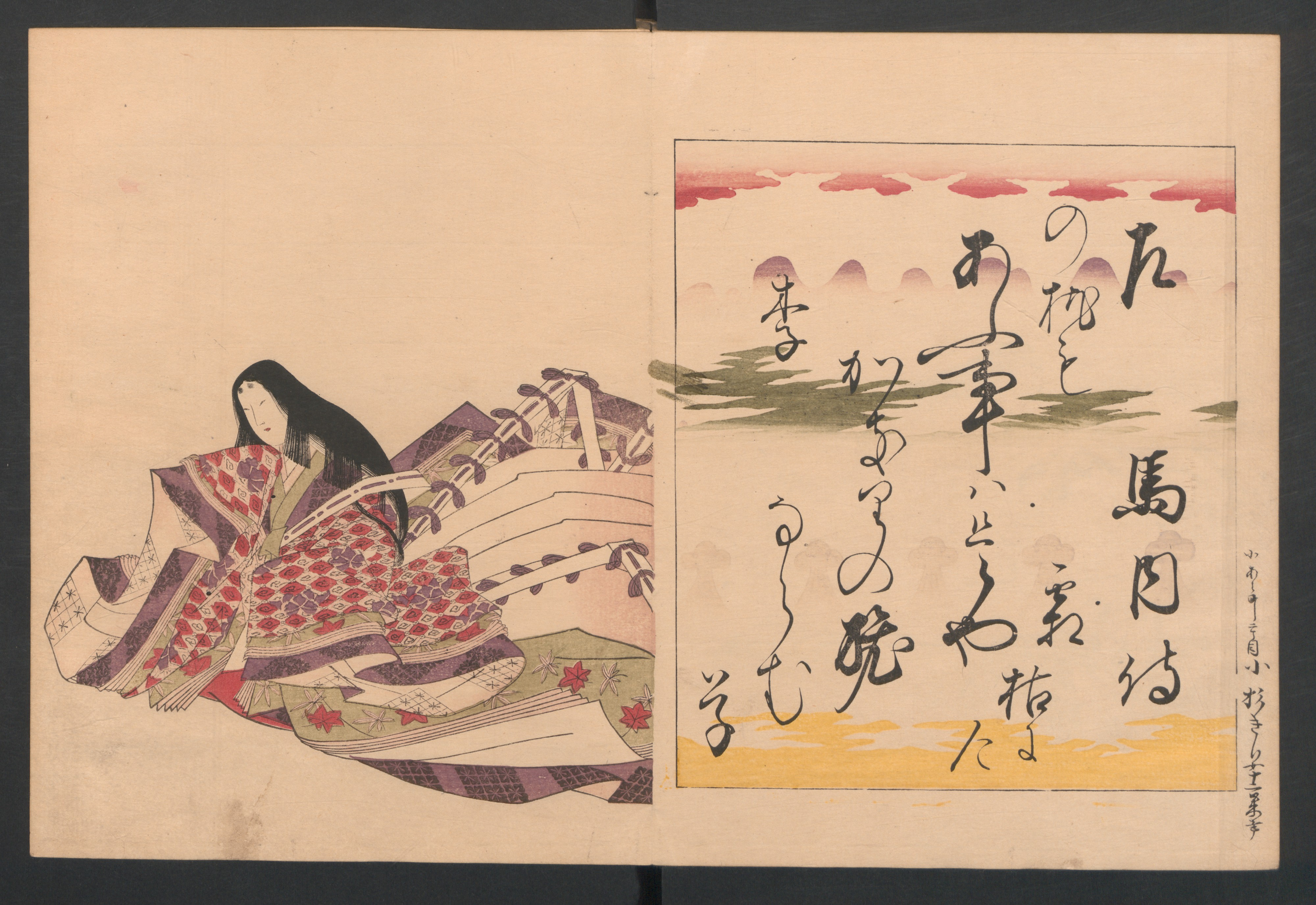
7. Uma no Naishi 馬内侍

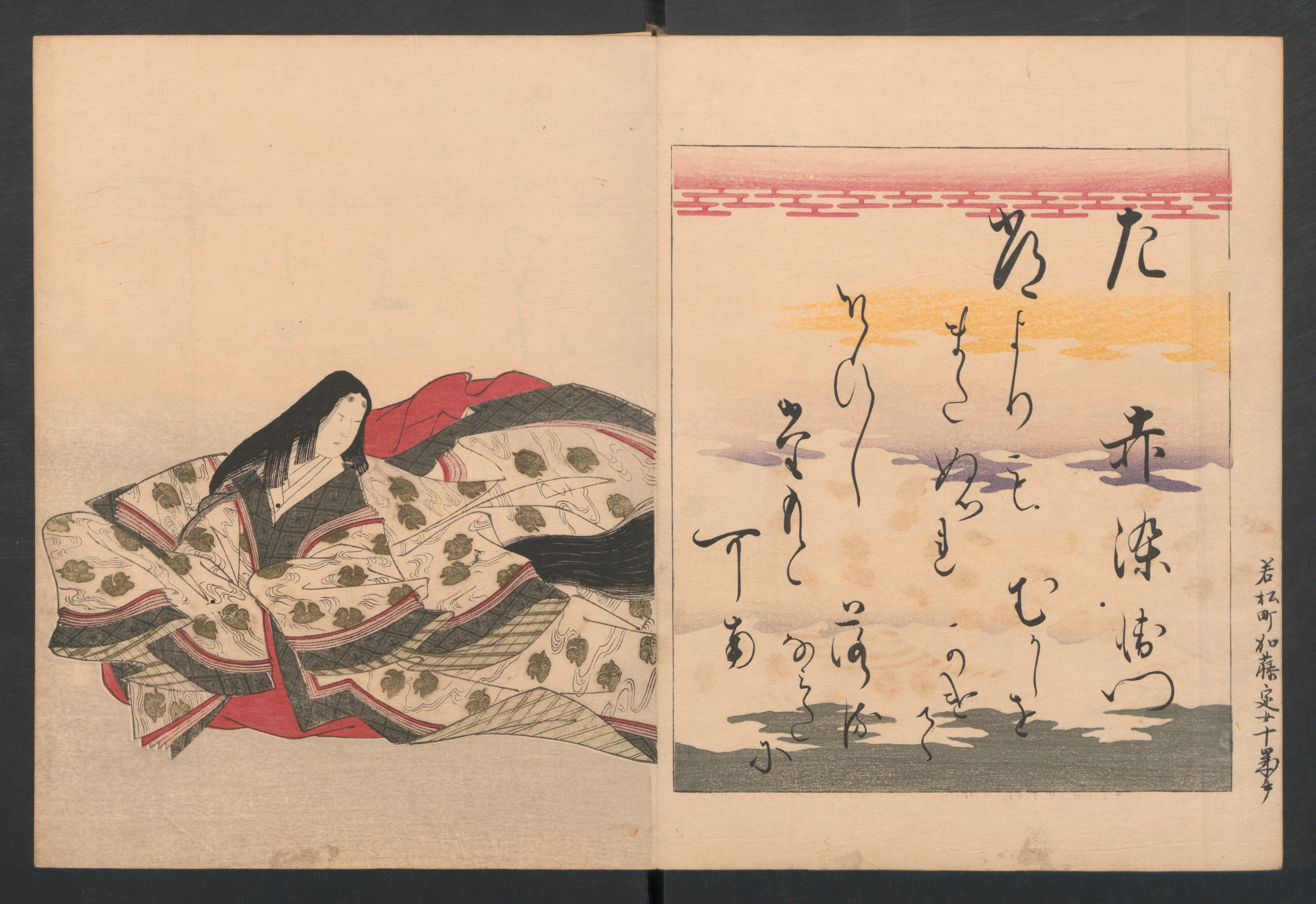
8. Akazome Emon 赤染衛門

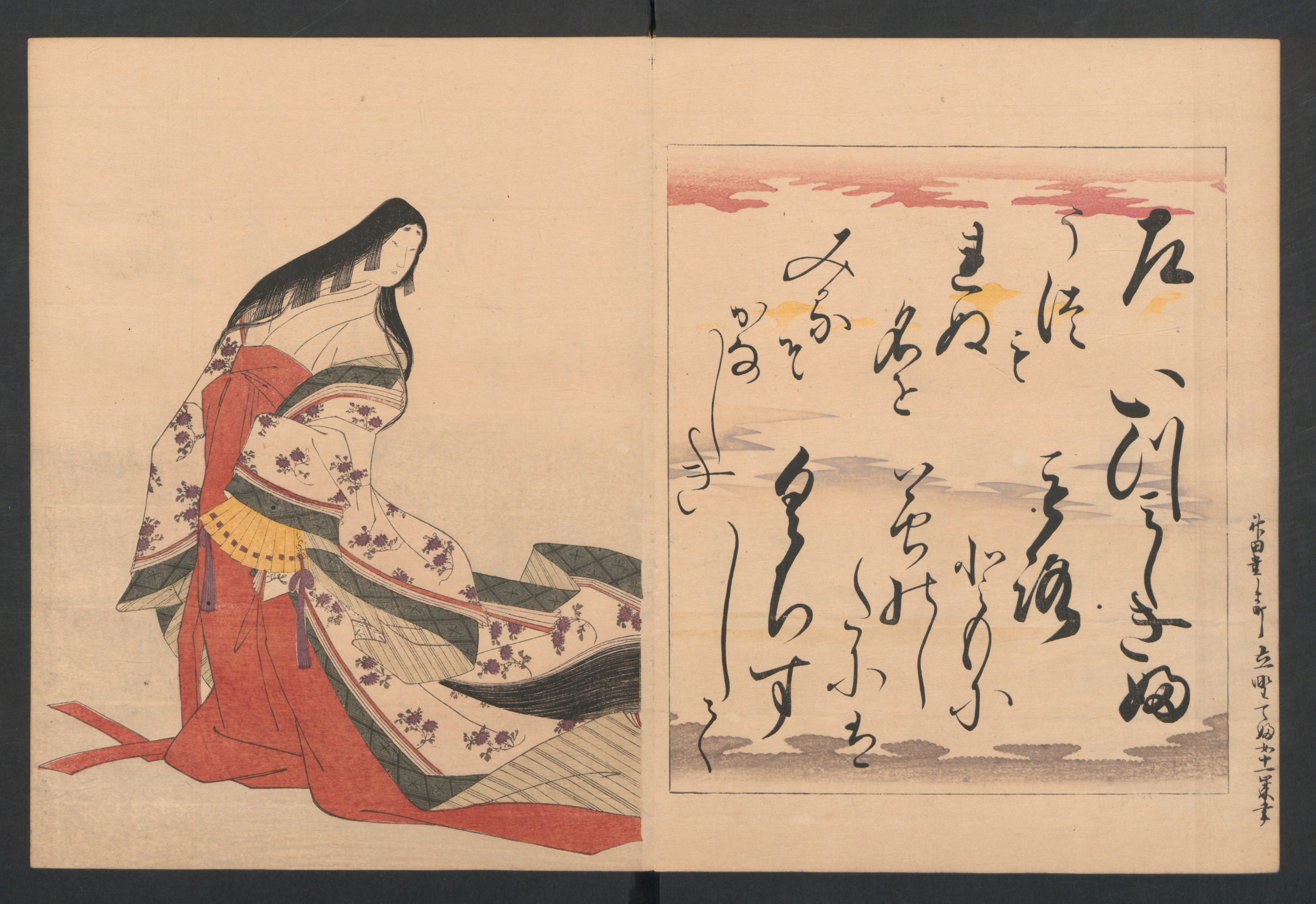
9. Izumi Shikibu 和泉式部

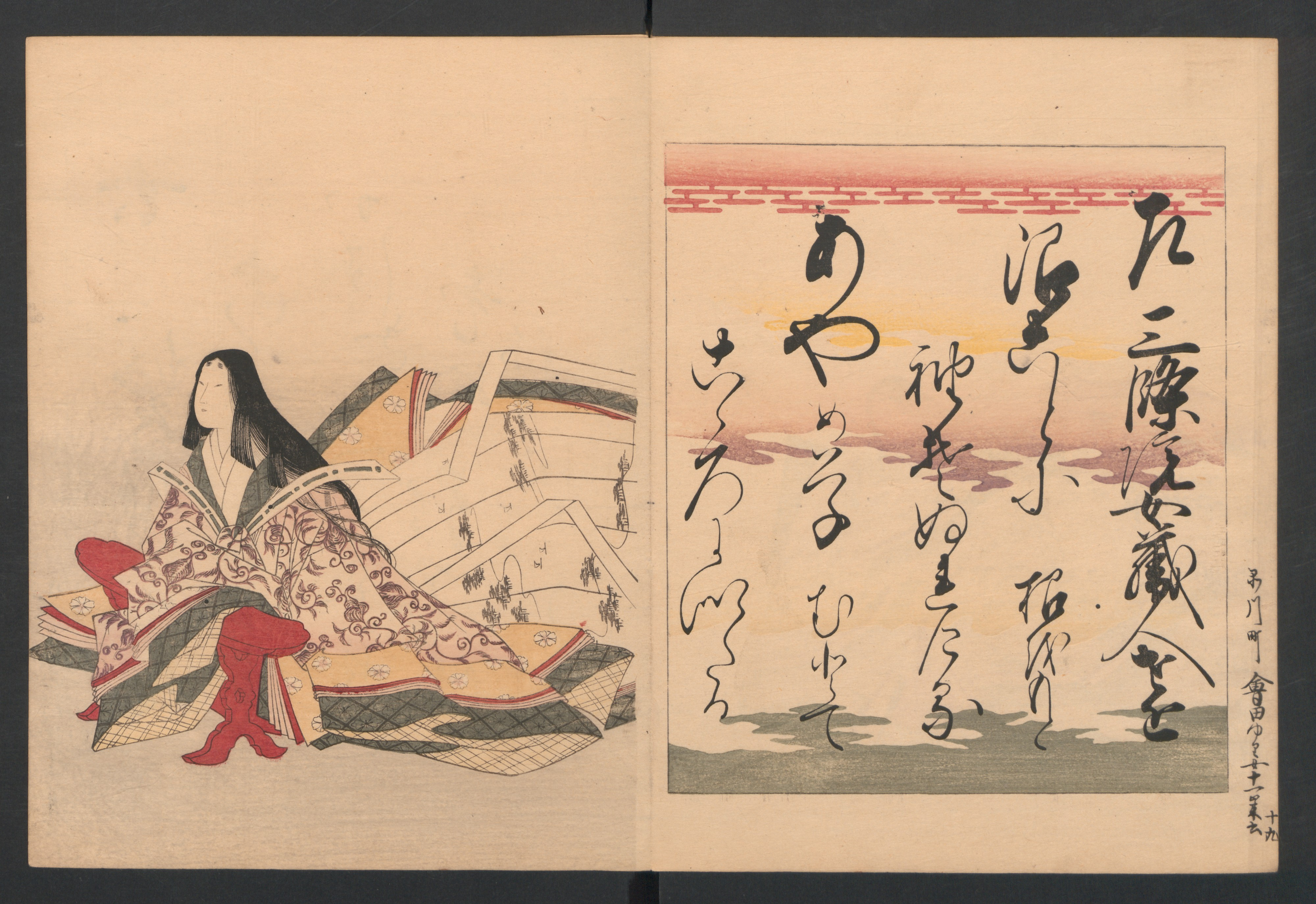
10. Kodai no Kimi 三条院女蔵人左近 小大君

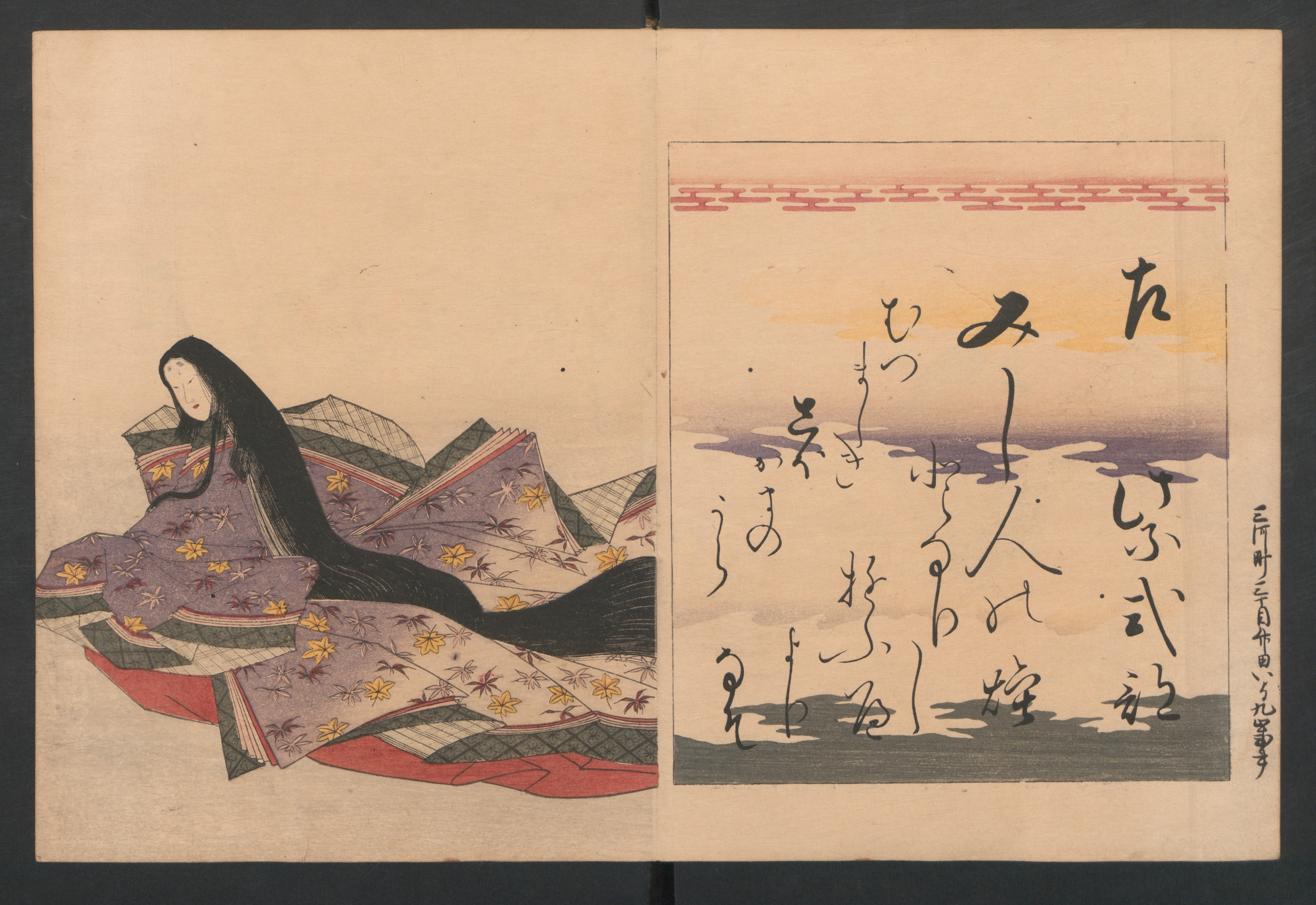
11. Murasaki Shikibu 紫式部

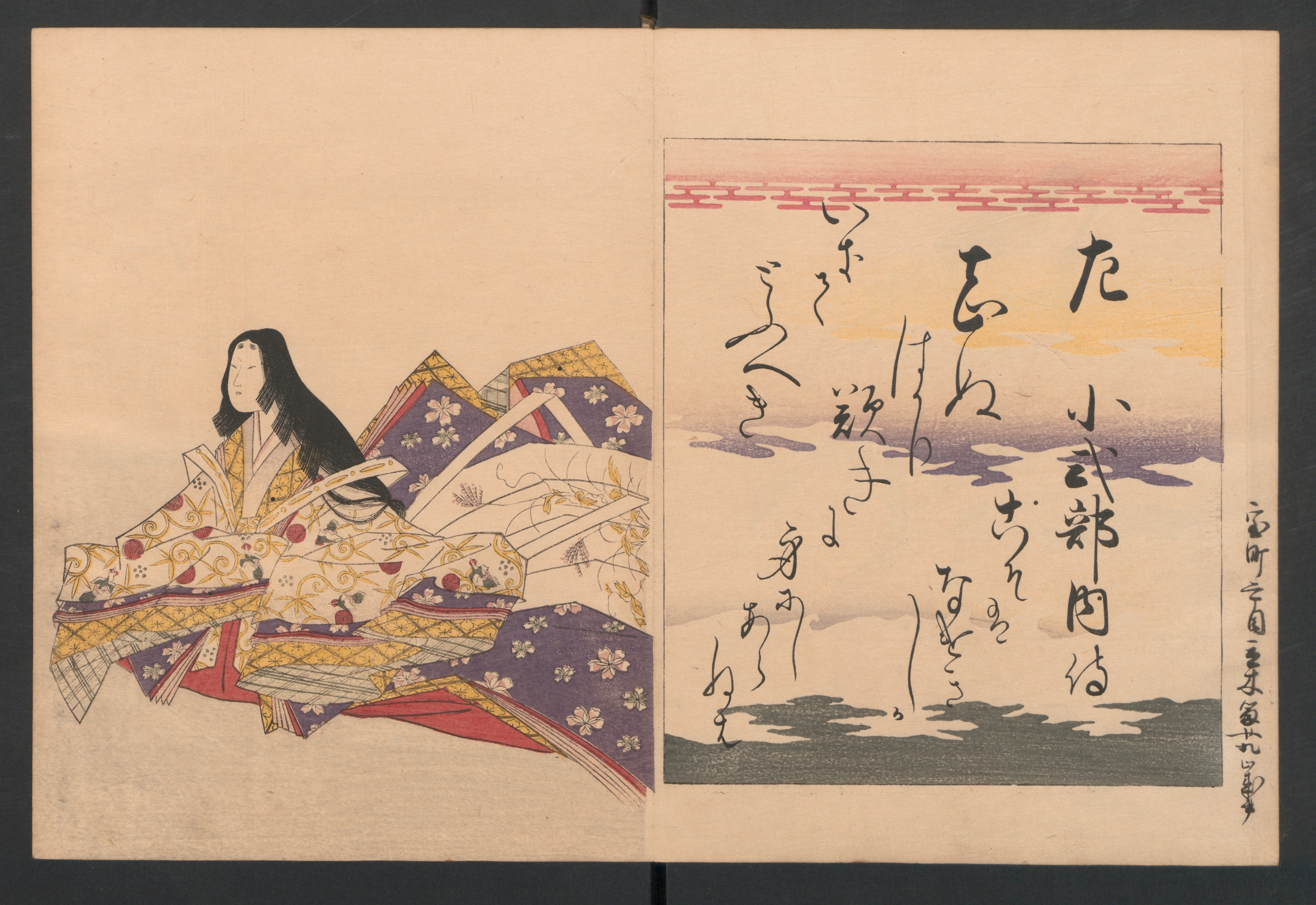
12. Koshikibu no Naishi 小式部内侍

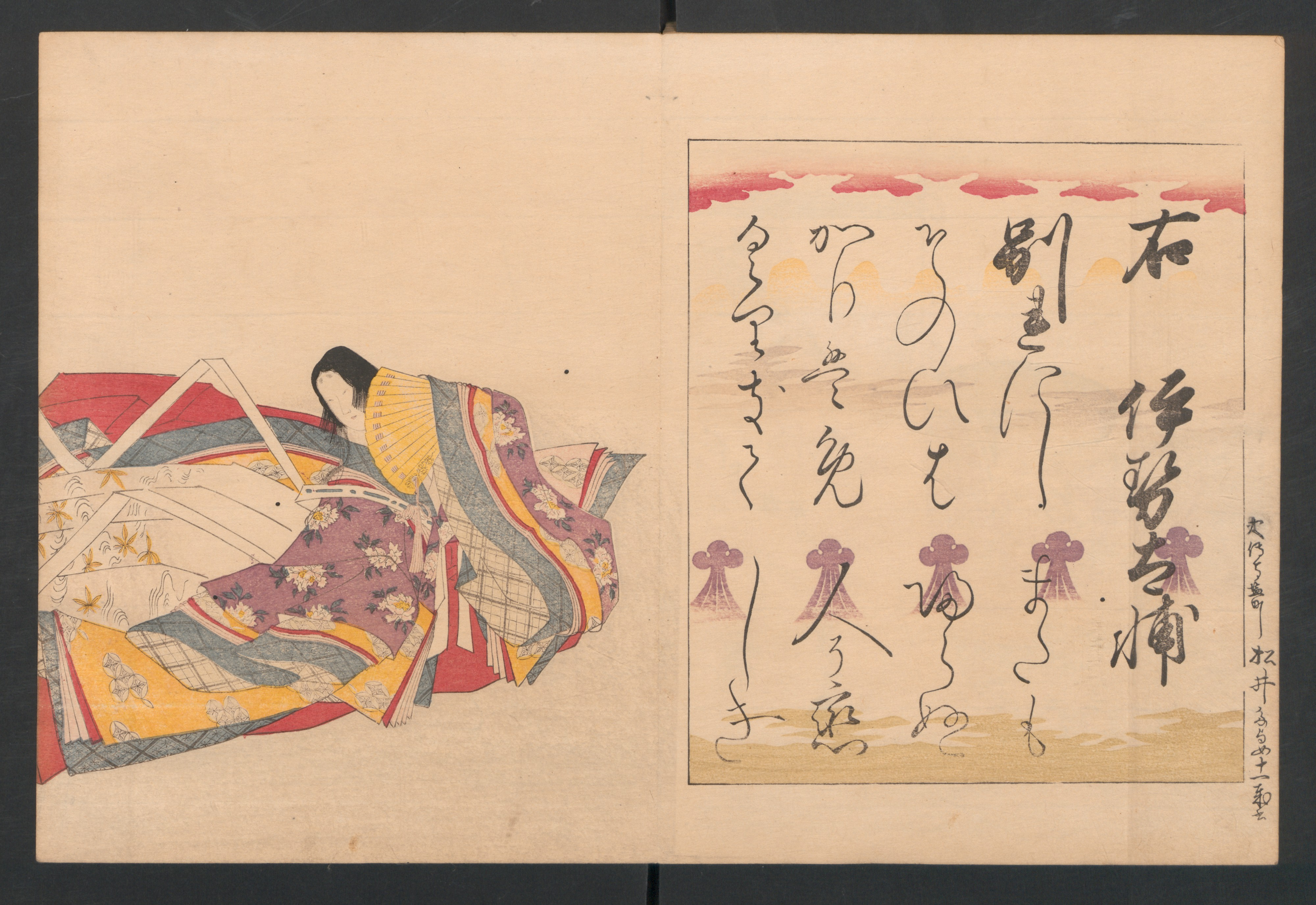
13. Ise no Taifu 伊勢大輔

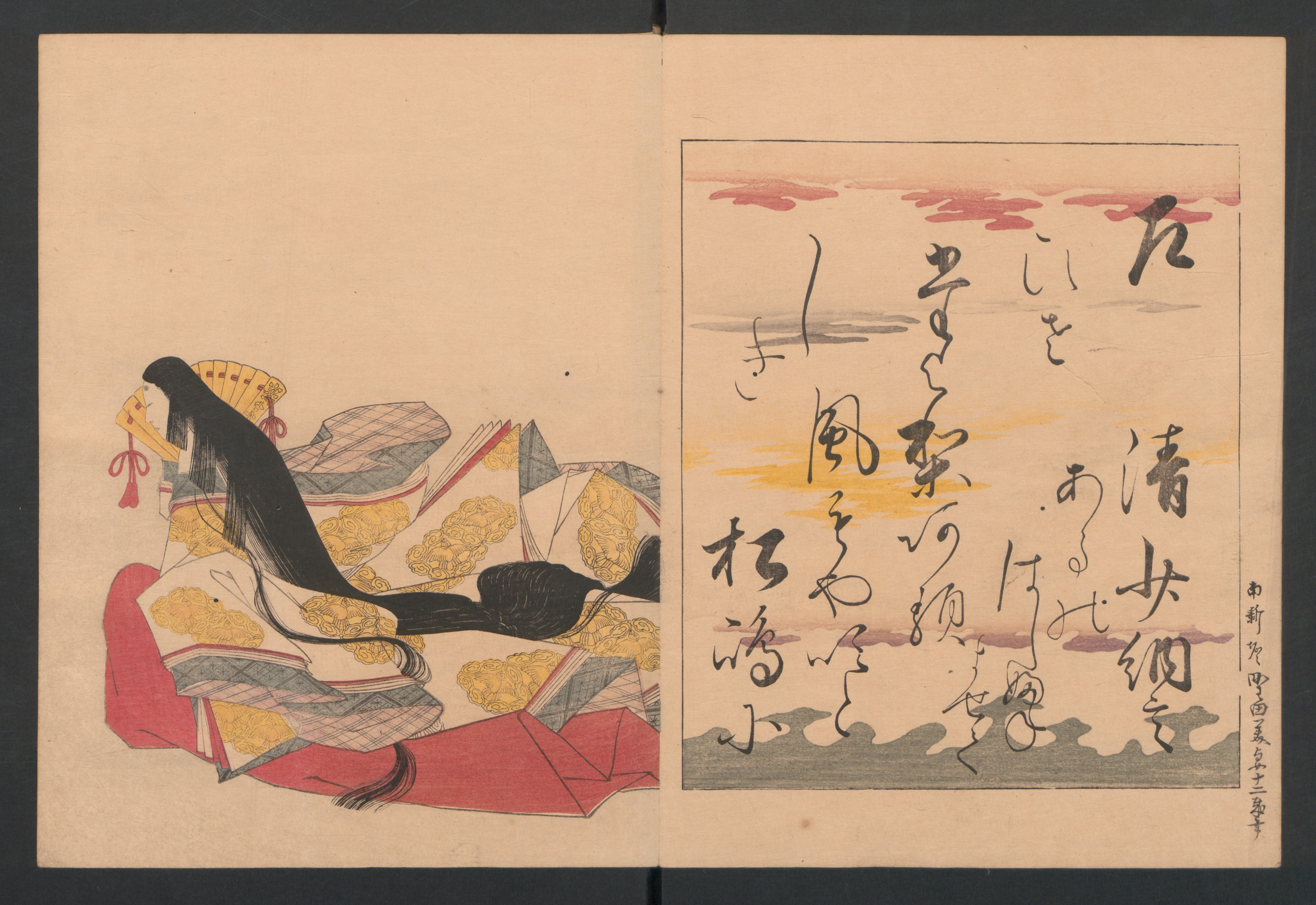
14. Sei Shōnagon 清少納言

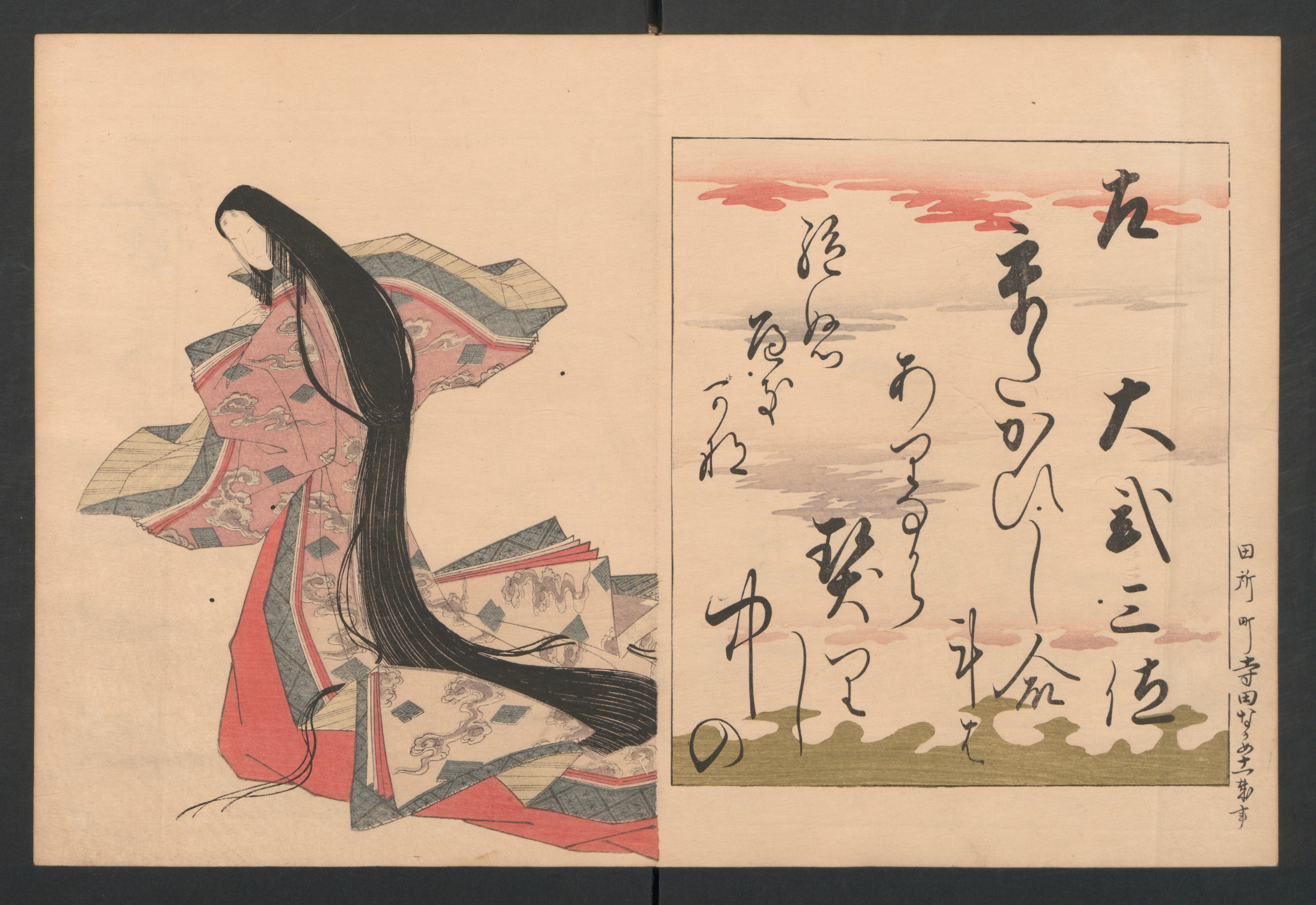
15.Daini no Sanmi 大弐三位

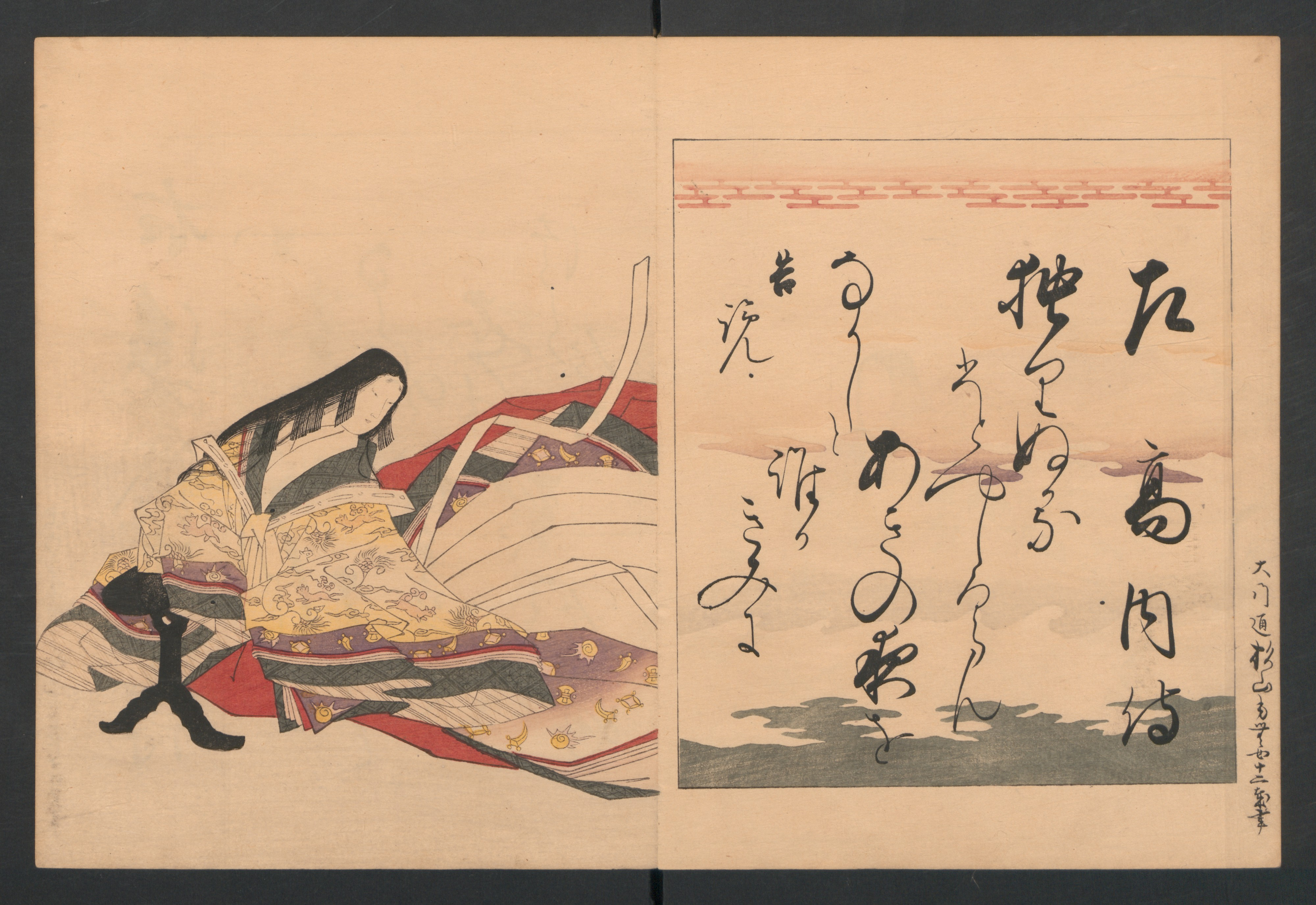
16. Takashina no Takako 高内侍

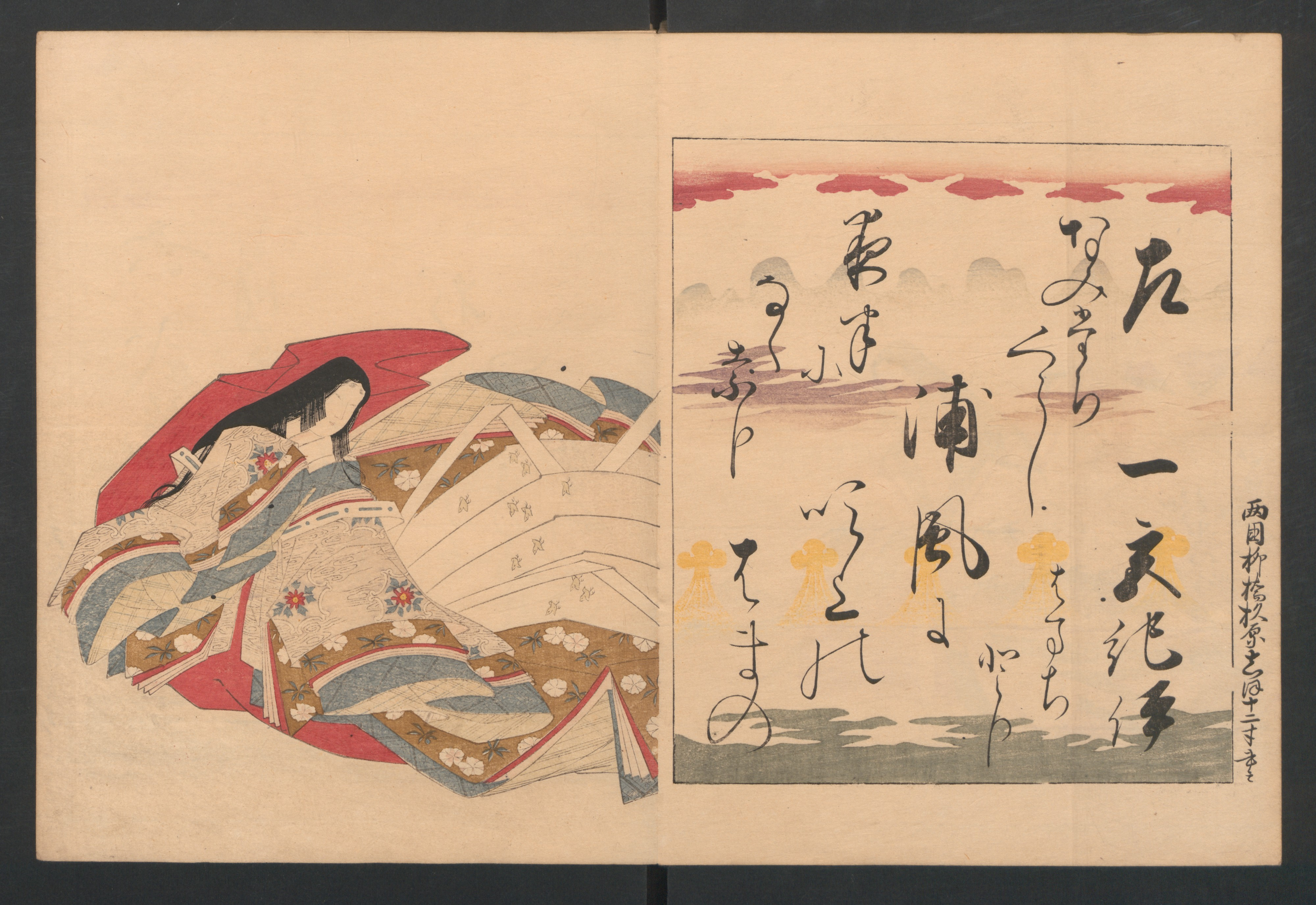
17. Yūshi Naishinnō-ke no Kii 一宮紀伊

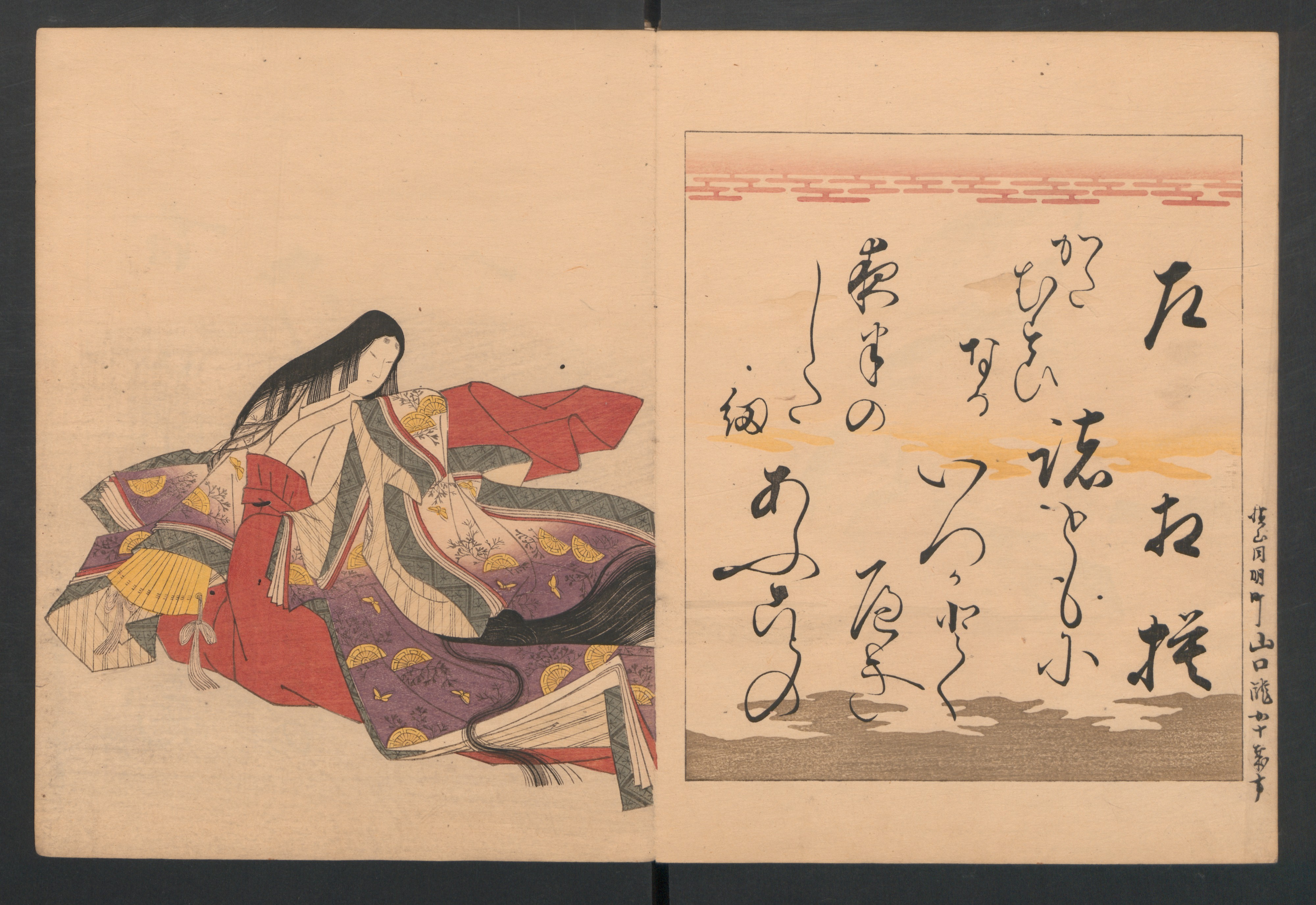
18. Sagami 相模

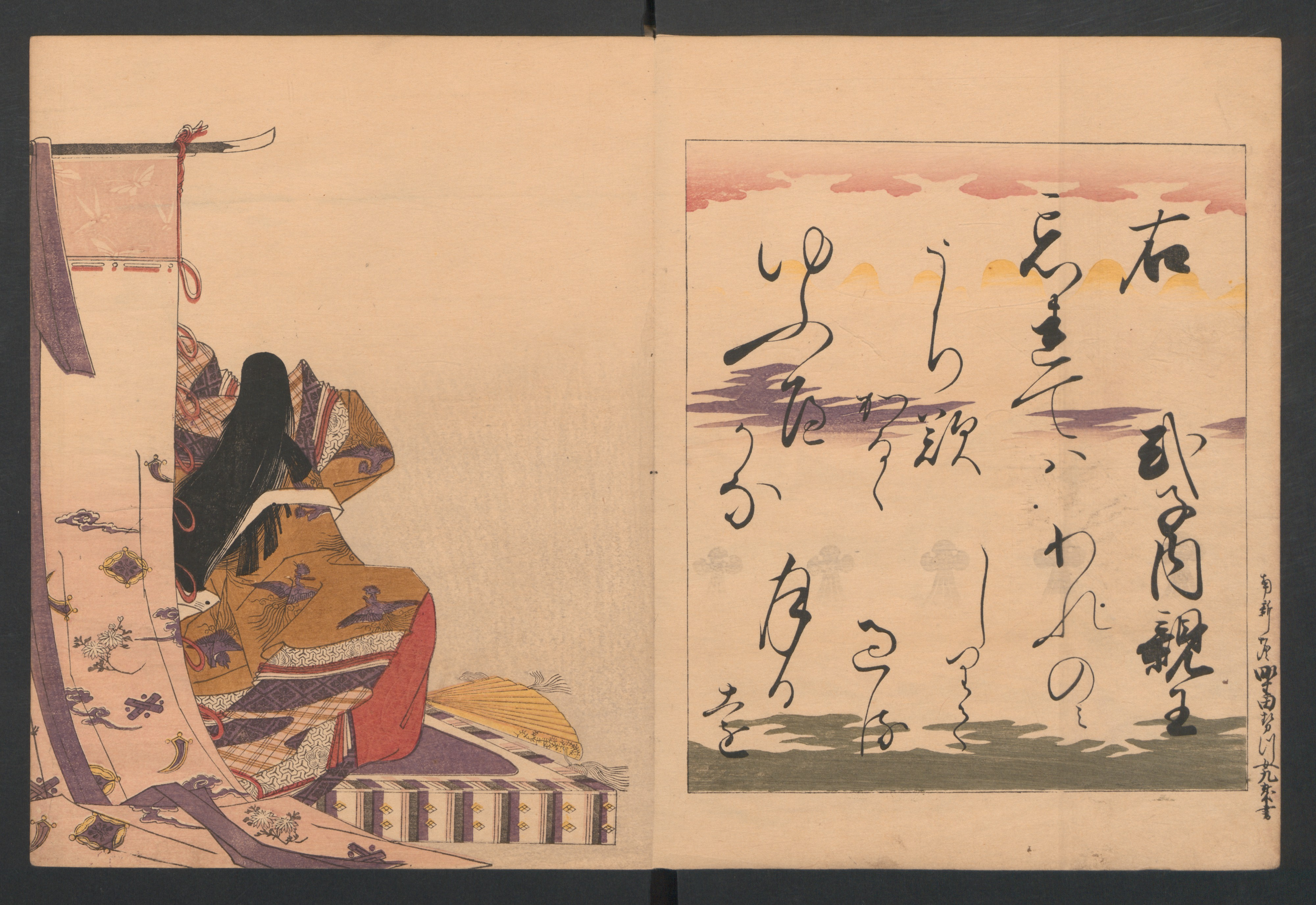
19. Princess Shikishi (Shikishi Naishinnō) 式子内親王

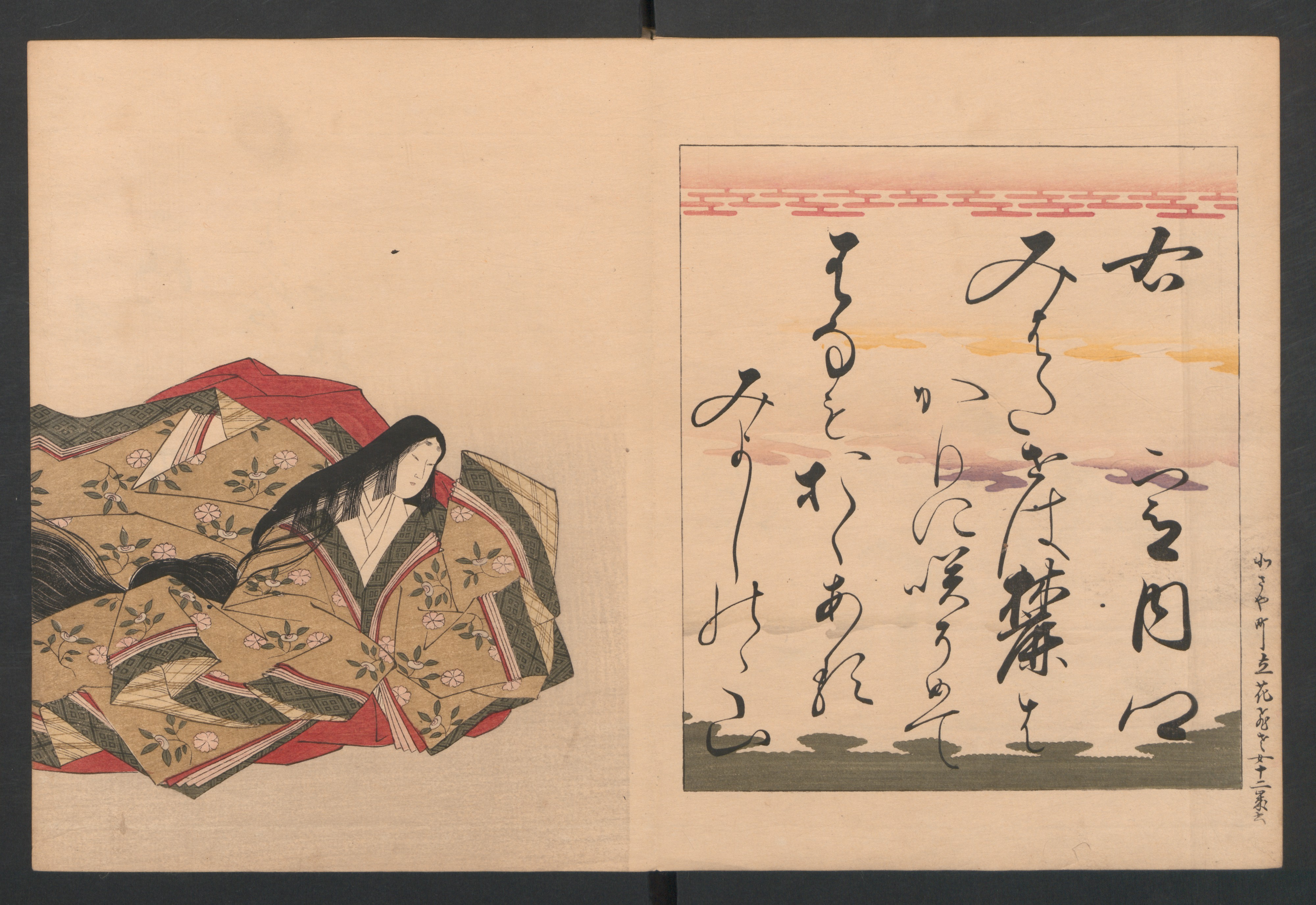
20. Kunai-kyō 宮内卿

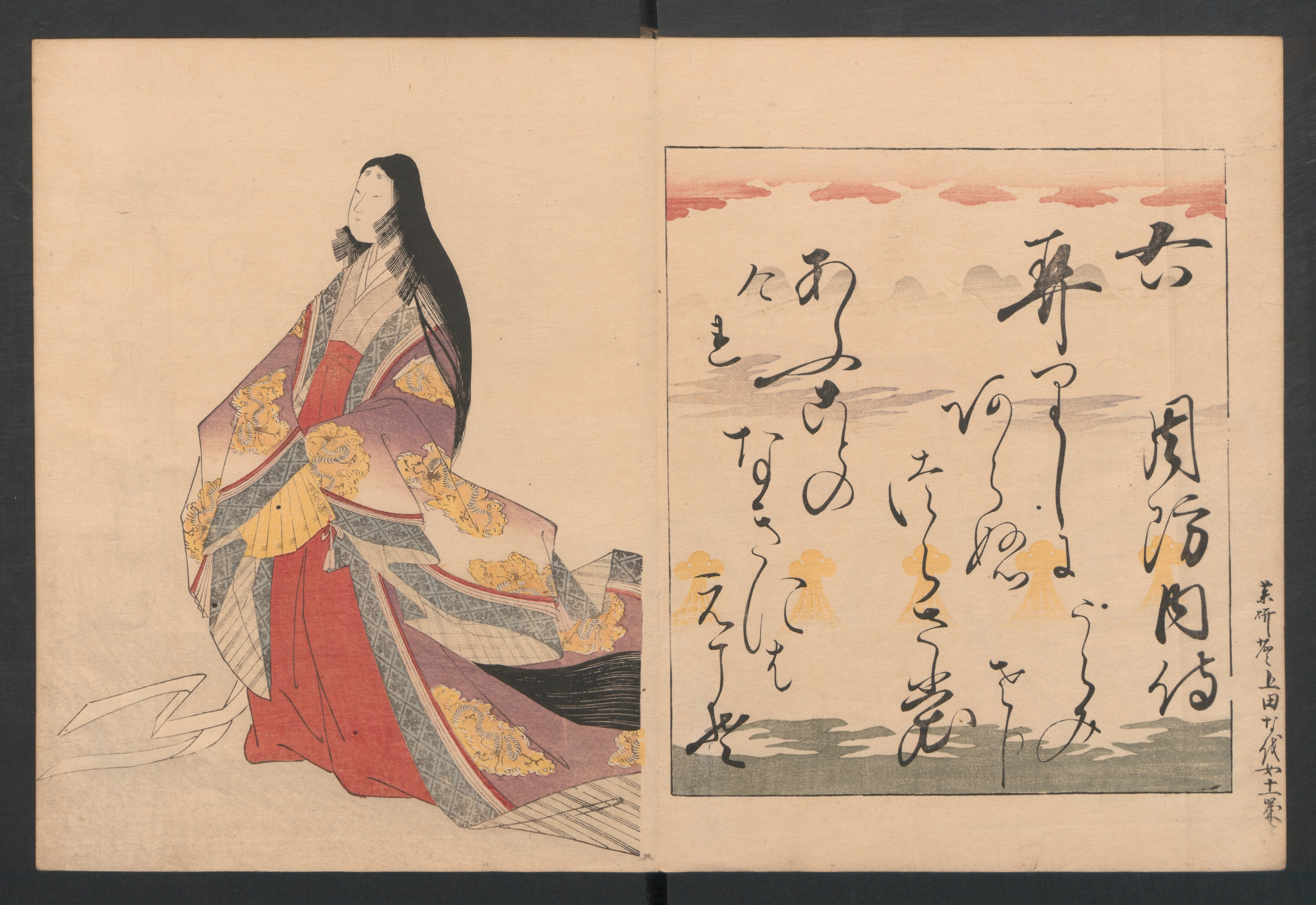
21 Suō no Naishi 周防内侍（平仲子

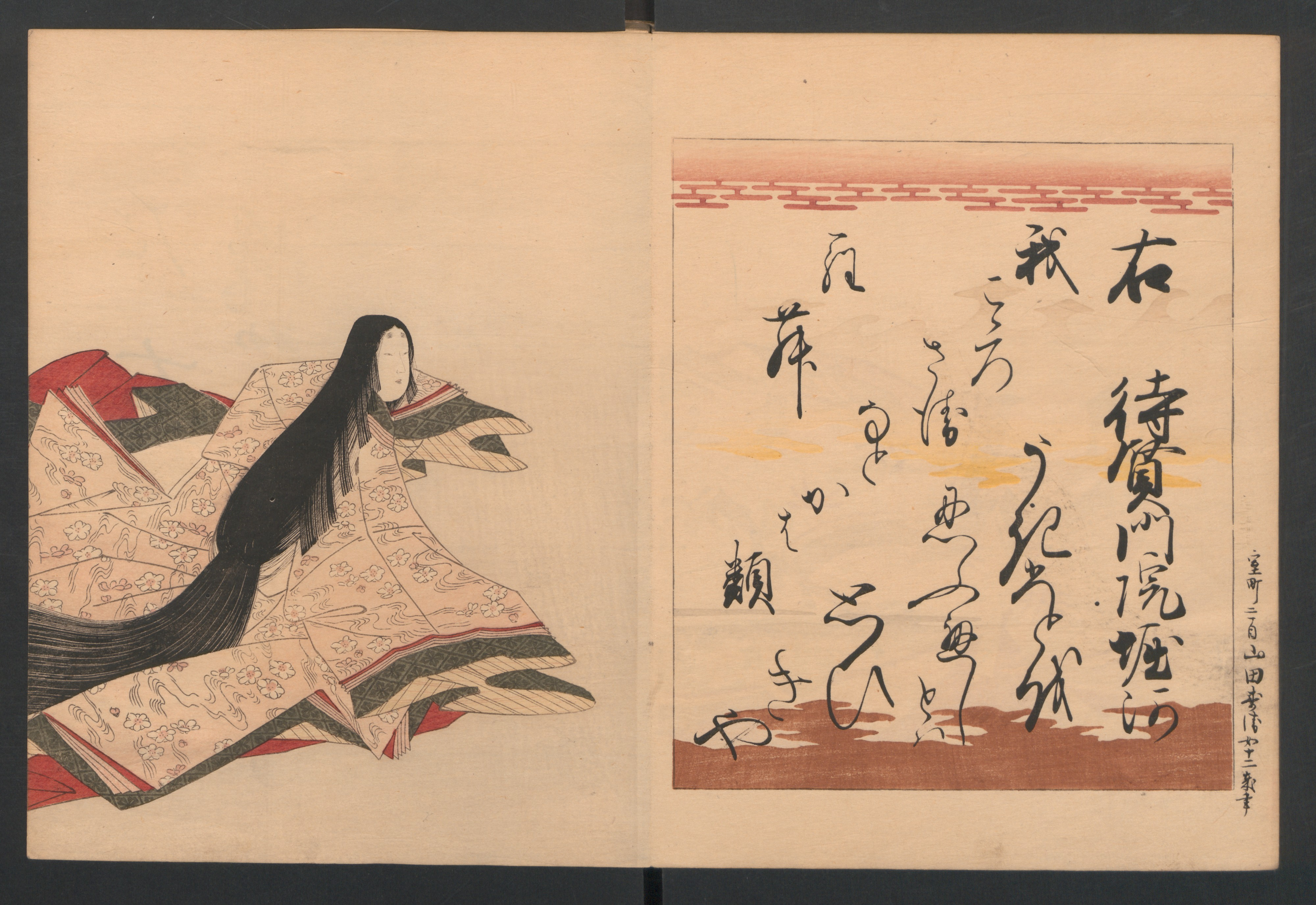
23. Taikenmon'in no Horikawa 待賢門院堀河

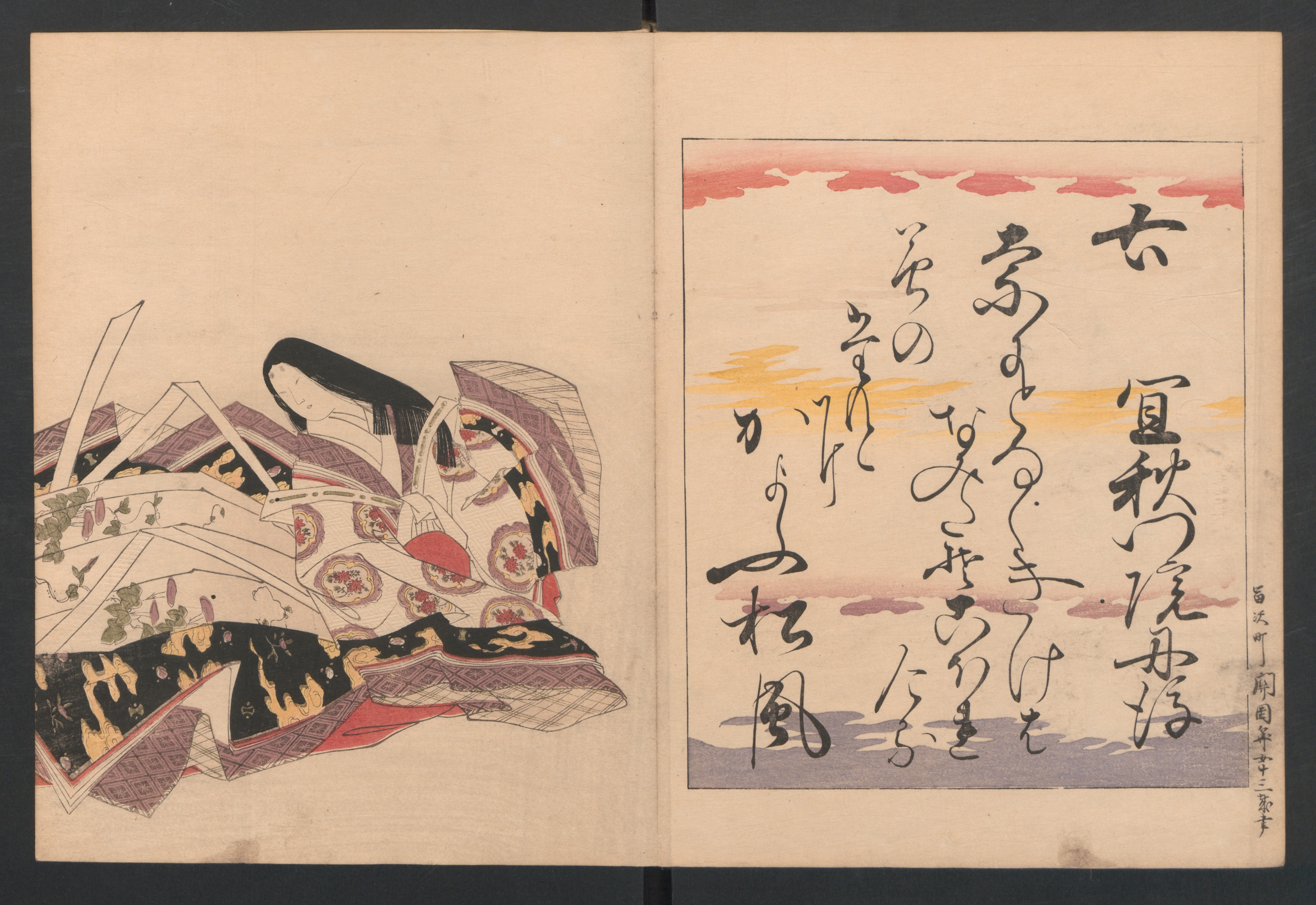
24. Gishūmon'in no Tango 宜秋門院丹後

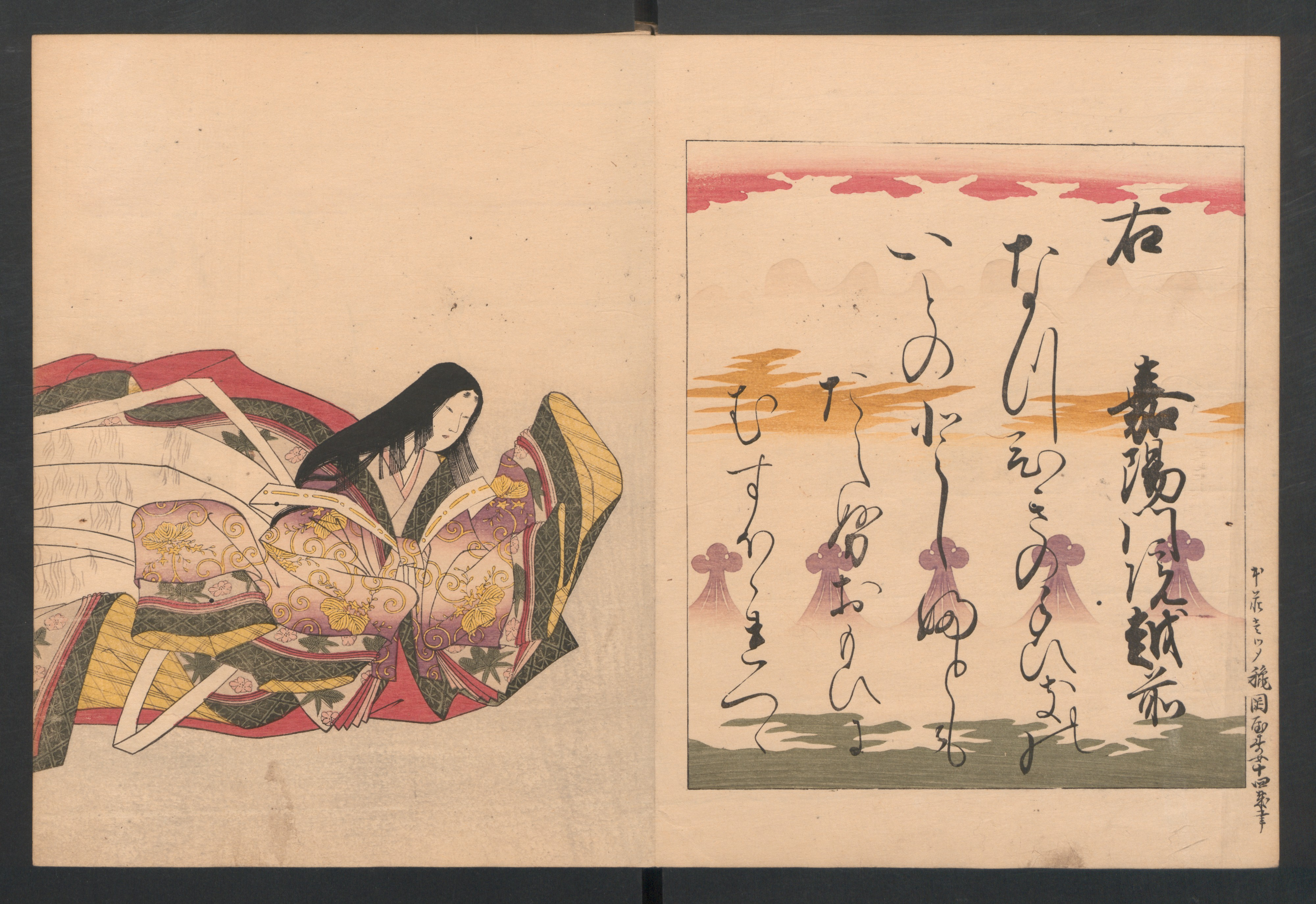
25. Kayōmon'in no Echizen 嘉陽門院越前

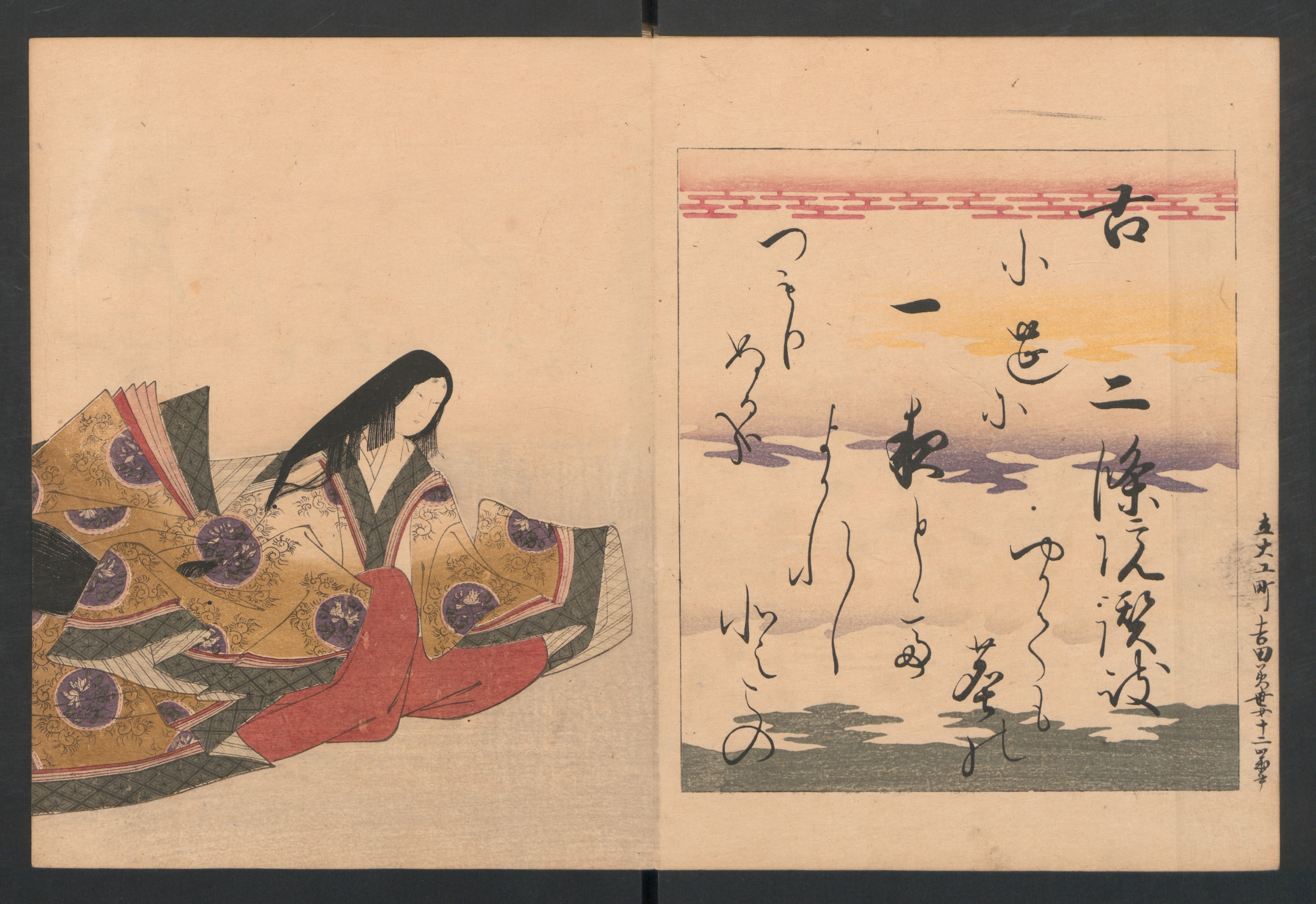
26. Nijōin no Sanuki 二条院讃岐

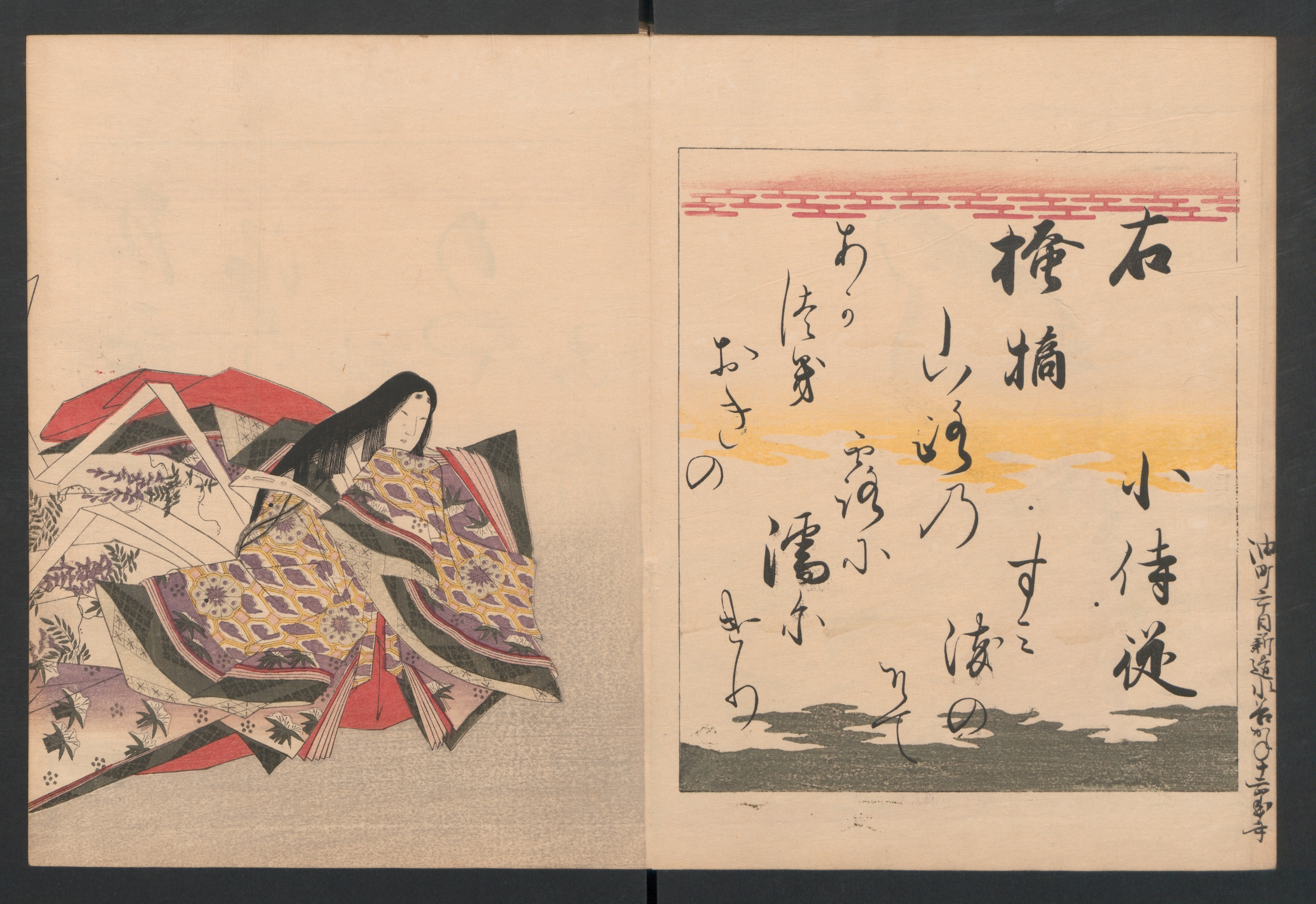
27. Kojijū 小侍従

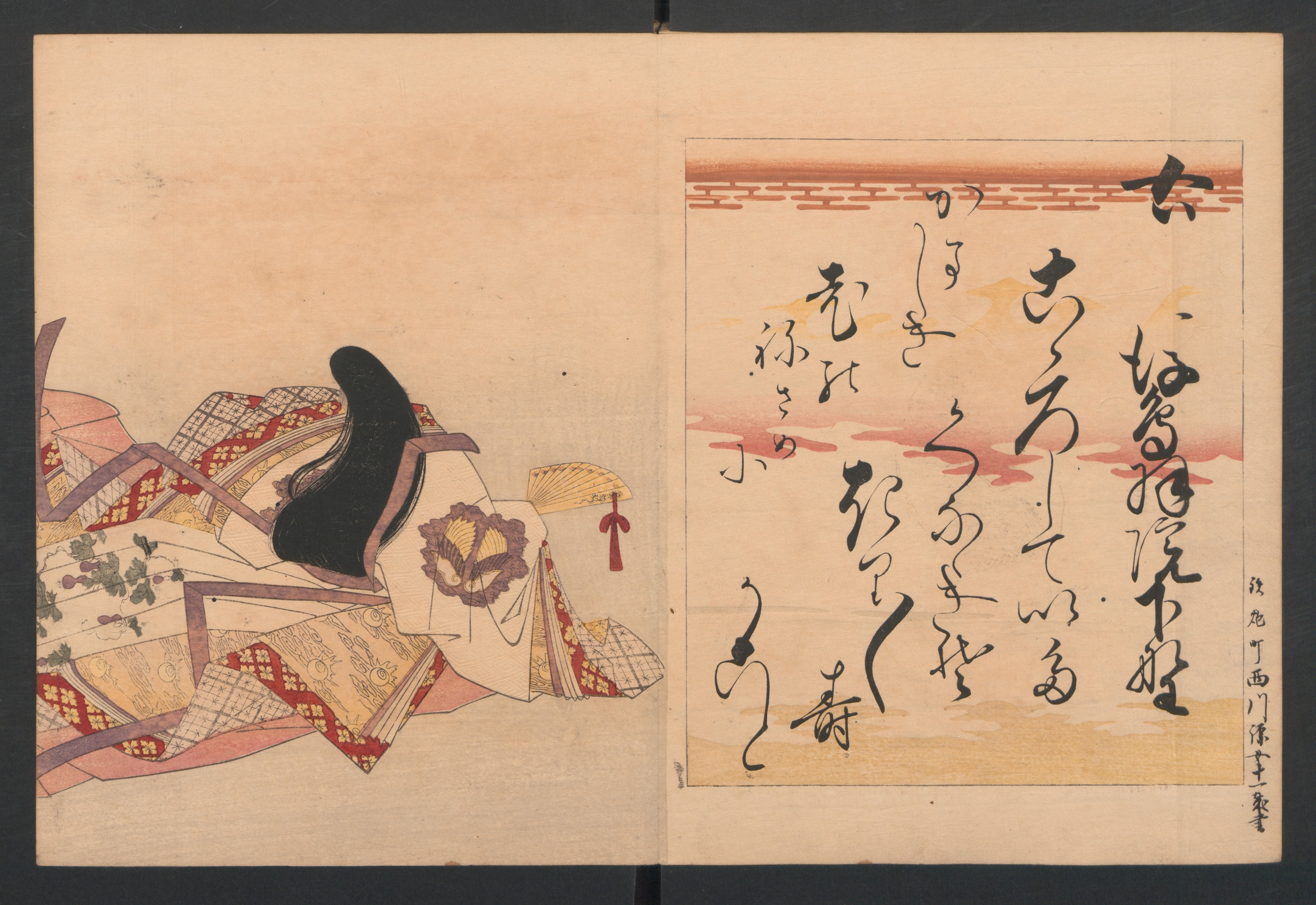
28. Go-Toba-in no Shimotsuke 後鳥羽院下野

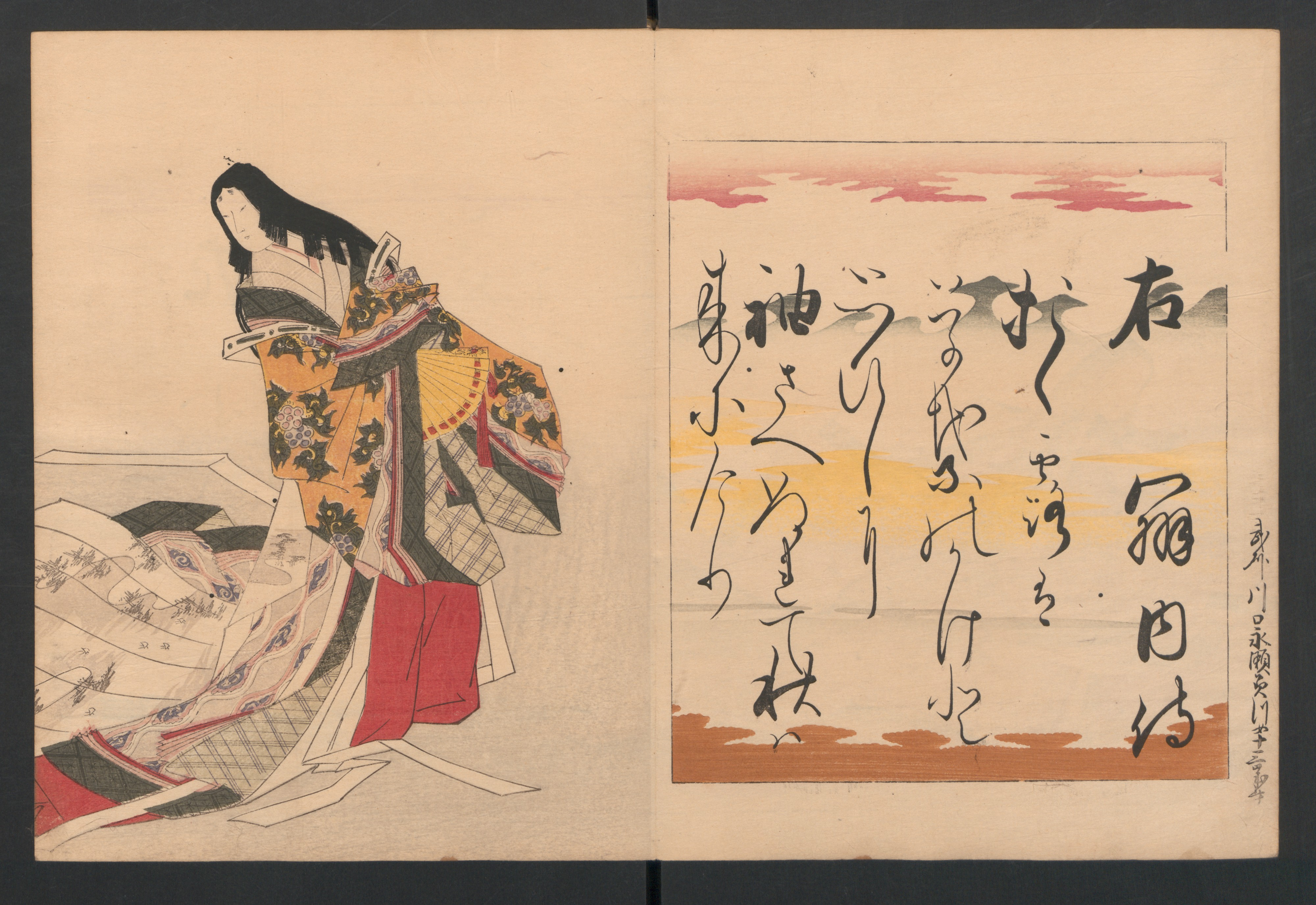
29. Ben no Naishi 弁内侍

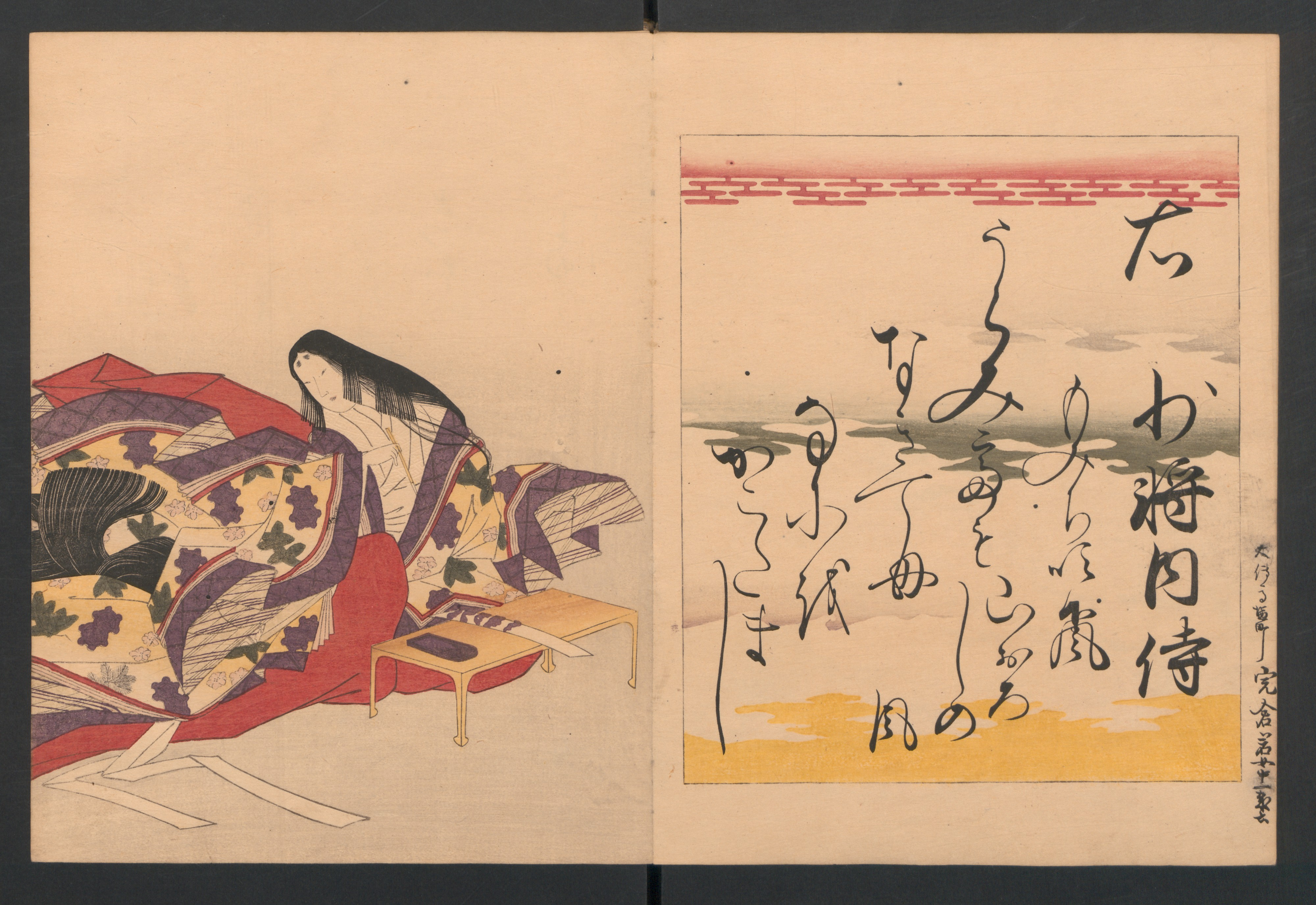
30. Gofukakusa-in no shōshō no naishi 少将内侍

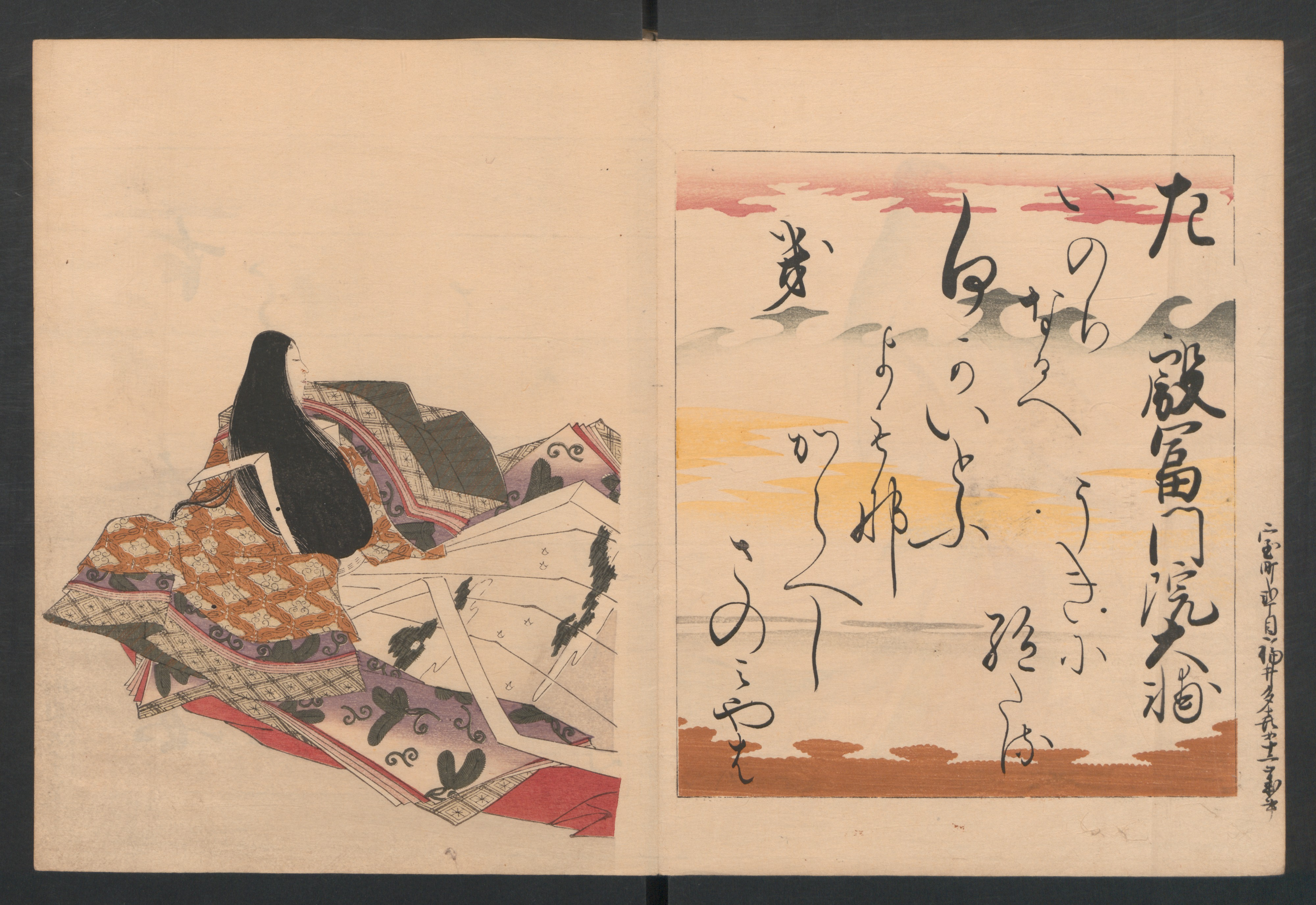
31. Inpumon'in no Tayū 殷富門院大輔

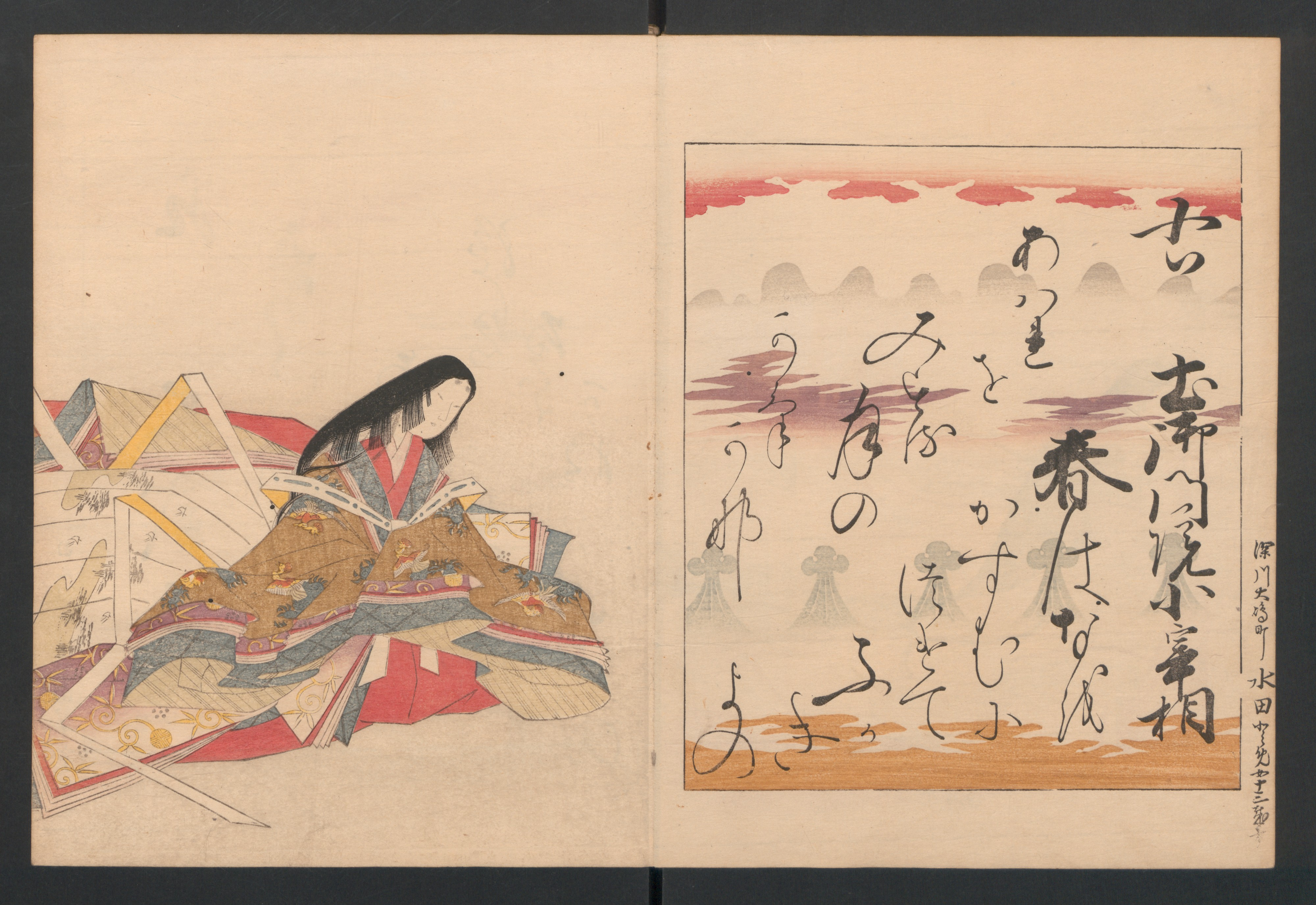
32. Tsuchimikado In no Kosaishō 土御門院小宰相

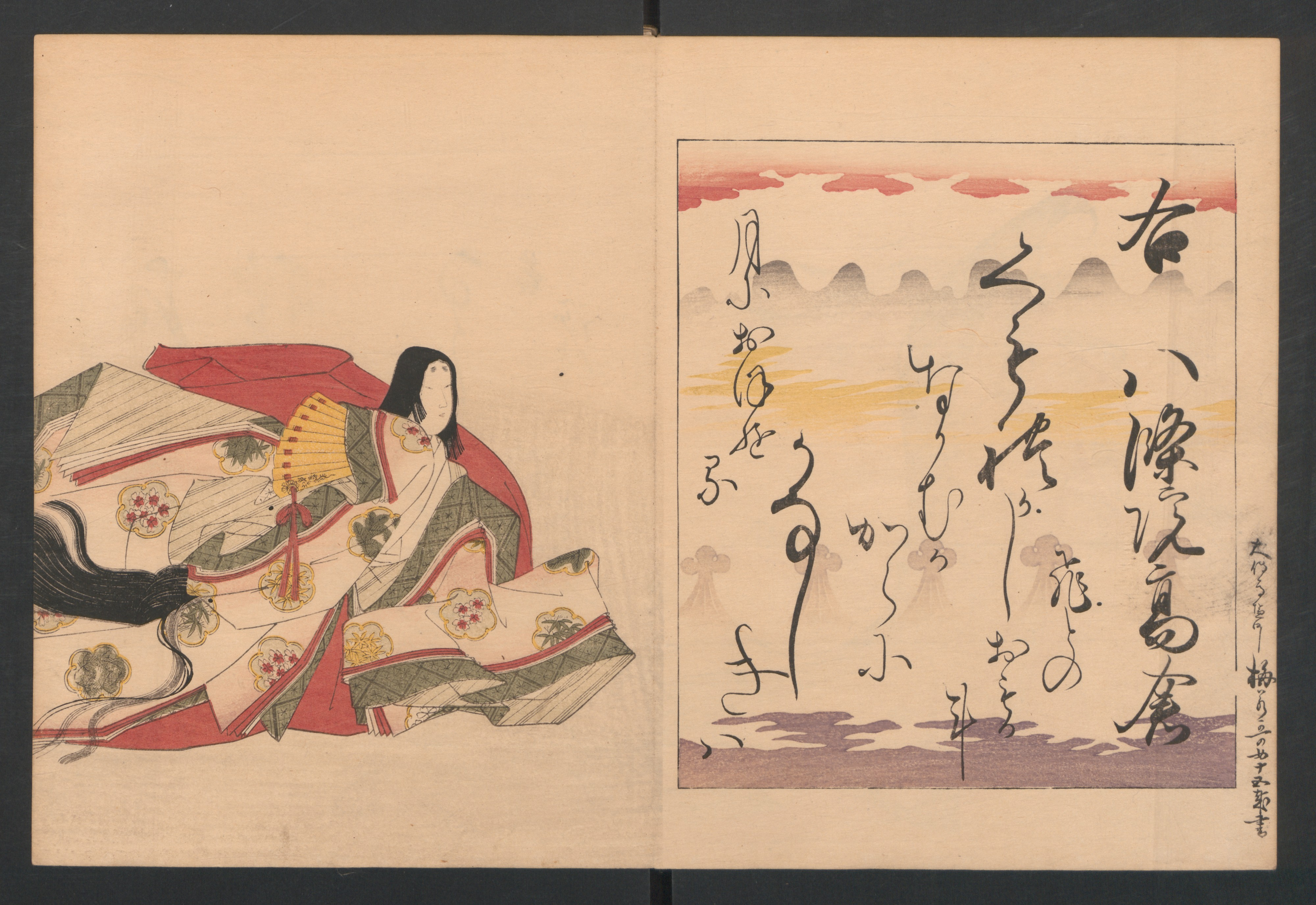
33. Hachijō-in Takakura 八条院高倉

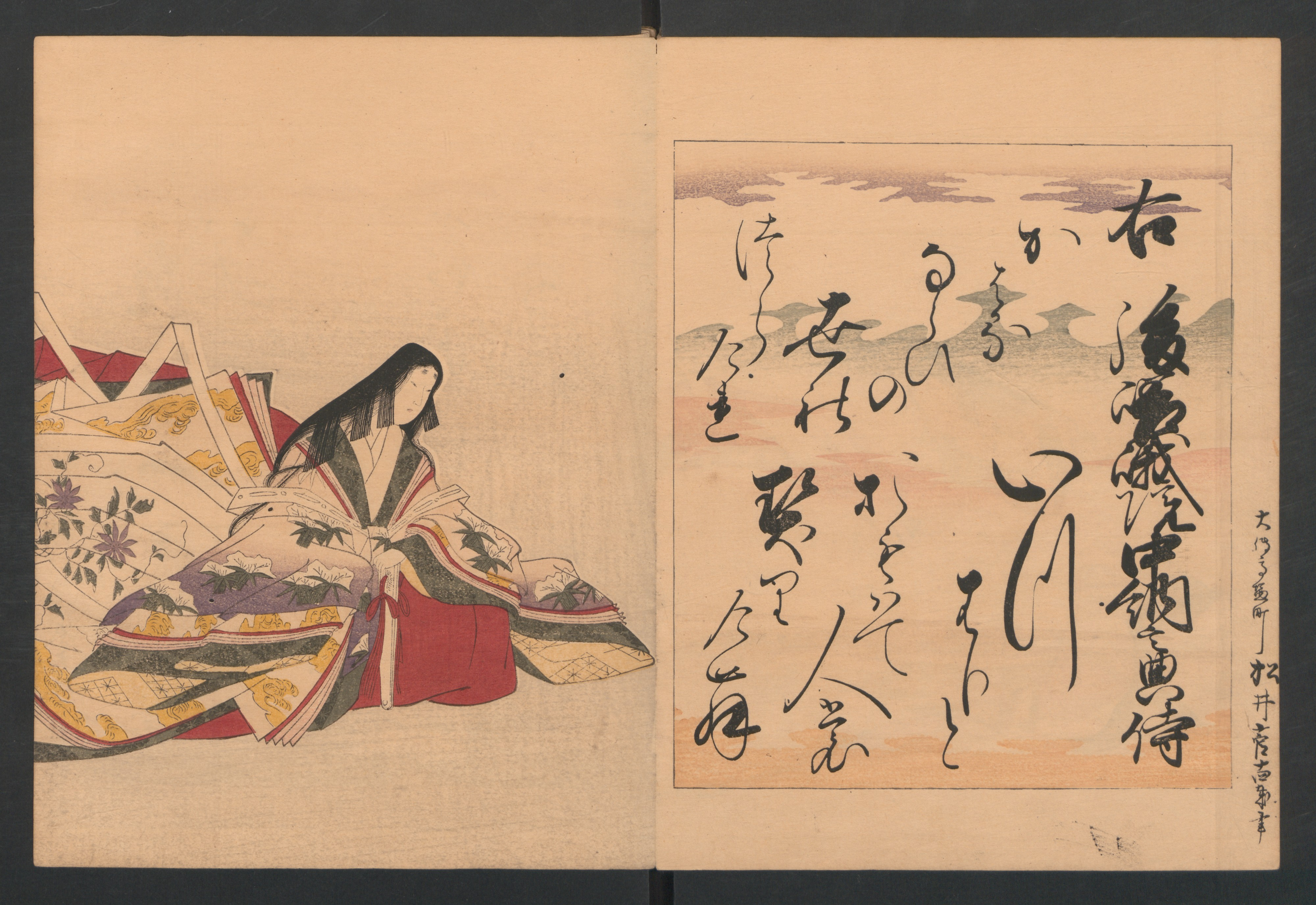
34. Fujiwara no Chikako 後嵯峨院中納言典侍（典侍藤原親子）

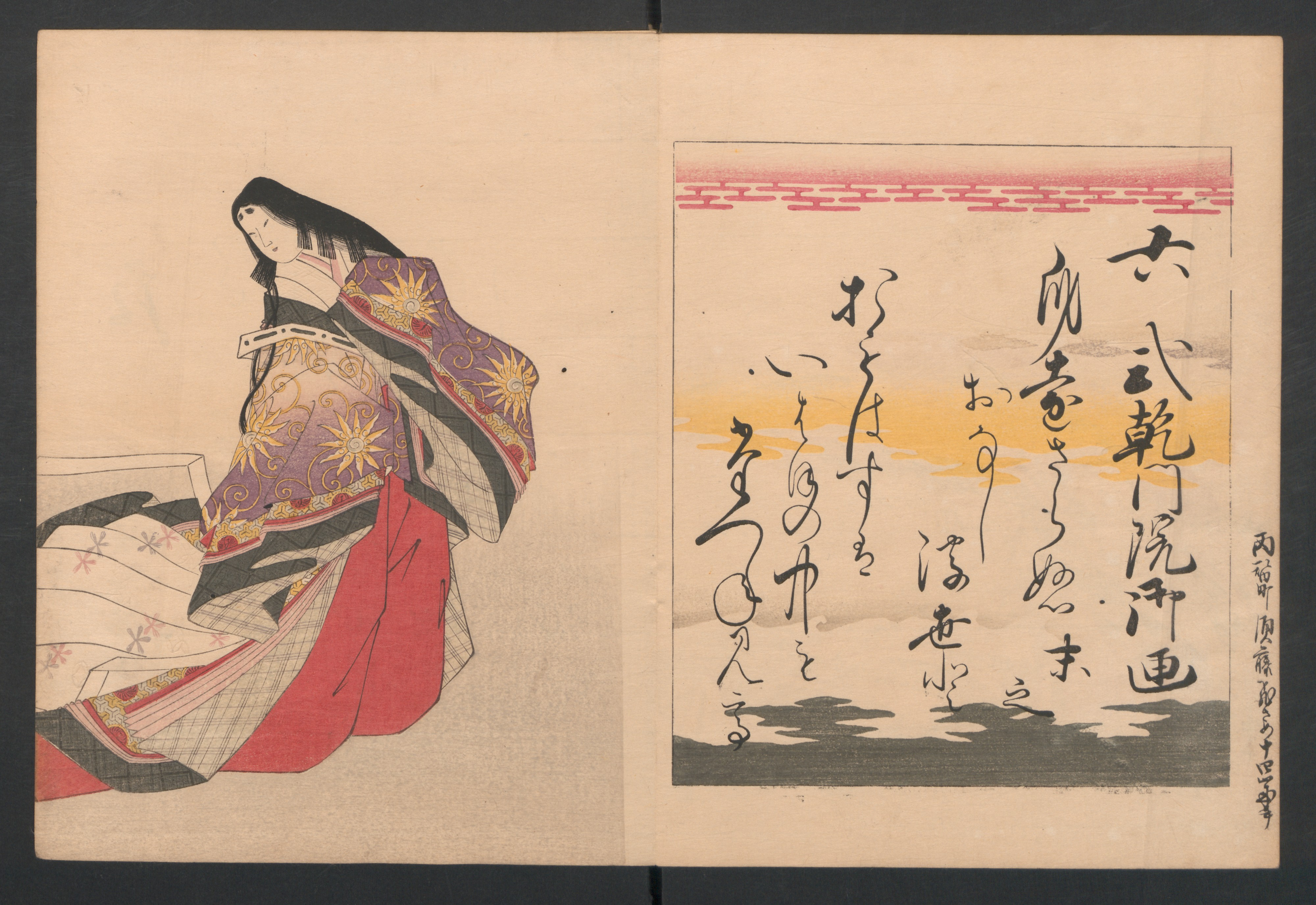
35. Shikikenmon'in no Mikushige 式乾門院御匣

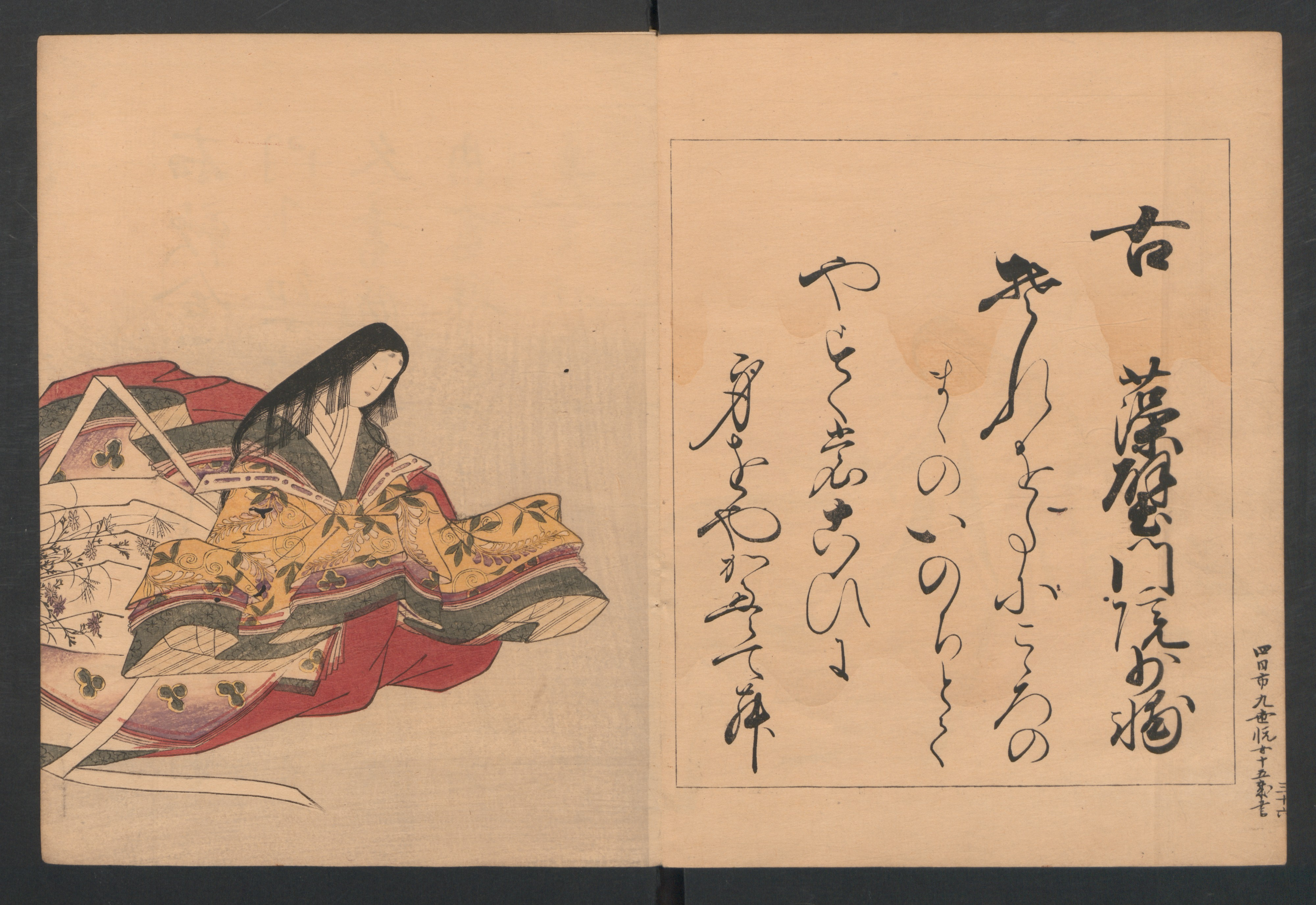
36. Sōhekimon'in no Shōshō 藻璧門院少将
