= Gofukakusa-in no shōshō no naishi =

Japanese poet

Gofukakusa-in no shōshō no naishi (Japanese: 後深草院 少将 内侍 died: around 1265), (also Shōshō no Naishi) was a Japanese poet during the Kamakura period. She was among the Thirty-Six Immortals of Poetry.

She was the daughter of the artist and aristocrat Fujiwara no Nobuzane and the younger sister of the poets Ben no naishi, Sōhekimon-in no shōshō and the painter Fujiwara no Tametsugu. She served as the court lady of Emperor Go-Fukakusa, from where her nickname comes.

Together with her sister Ben no naishi, she belonged to a group of Renga-style poets whose works were included in the Tsukubashū collection created around 1356.
