= Kayōmon'in no Echizen =

Japanese poet

Kayōmon'in no Echizen (嘉陽門院越前; early 13th century) was a waka poet and Japanese noblewoman active in the Kamakura period. She served Fujiwara no Shokushi (Shichijō-in), the mother of Emperor Go-Toba as well as Go-Toba's daughter Kayōmon-in. Although the dates of her life are difficult to determine, she was still writing poetry as late as 1248.

Her work appears in a large number of imperial poetry collections, including Shingoshūi Wakashū, Senzai Wakashū, Shokugosen Wakashū, Gyokuyō Wakashū, Shinsenzai Wakashū, Shinchokusen Wakashū, and others. Seven of her poems were collected in the Shin Kokin Wakashū. She was a member of the Ōnakatomi clan and likely the daughter of Ōnakatomi no Kimichika (大中臣公親), the chief priest-administrator of Ise Shrine. She was designated a member of the Thirty-Six Immortal Women Poets (女房三十六歌仙, Nyōbō Sanjūrokkasen). She is also known as Ise no Nyōbō (伊勢女房).

== Poetry ==
One of her poems that was included in the Shin Kokin Wakashū was a direct reference to an anonymous poem in the Kokin Wakashū written 300 years prior.

Natsubiki no
tebiki no ito o
kurikaeshi
koto shigekutomo
taemu to omou na

Translation:

In summer's spinning,
Hand-spun threads are whirling
Around and around
Rumors may run thickly but
Do not think of cutting short.

Natsubiki no
tebiki no ito o
toshi futomo
taenu omoi ni
musubohoretsutsu

Translation:

Though our years stretch out
In even line like hand-spun thread
In summer's spinning, yet,
In a love that will not be cut
We ourselves are now so tangled ...
