= Go-Toba-in no Shimotsuke =

Lady Shimotsuke, attendant to retired Emperor Go-Toba (後鳥羽院下野, Go-Toba-in no Shimotsuke; dates unknown) was a waka poet and Japanese noblewoman active in the Kamakura period.

Many of her poems appear in imperial poetry collections, including Shingoshūi Wakashū, Senzai Wakashū, Shokugosen Wakashū, Gyokuyō Wakashū, Shinsenzai Wakashū, Shinchokusen Wakashū, and others. She is designated as a member of the Female Thirty-Six Immortals of Poetry (女房三十六歌仙, Nyōbō Sanjūrokkasen).

She is also known as Shinnō (信濃).
