= Ben no Naishi =

Ben no Naishi (1220s?–ca. 1270?) was a 13th-century Japanese court lady, poet, and memoirist.

Ben no Naishi was the daughter of the poet and painter Fujiwara Nobuzane; her younger sister Shosho no Naishi was also a poet. She served at court as a lady in waiting to Emperor Go-Fukakusa from 1243 until the Emperor's abdication in 1259. During her time as a lady in waiting she was responsible for the three imperial regalia of Japan. Her memoir, Ben no naishi nikki, begins with Go-Fukakusa's accession aged three in 1246, and ends (the text is damaged) in 1252.
