= Yūshi Naishinnō-ke no Kii =

Japanese poet in the late-Heian period

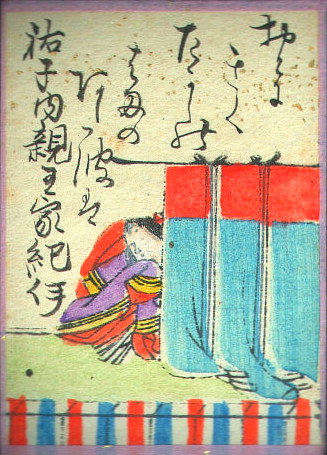
Yūshi Naishinnō-ke no Kii in the Ogura Hyakunin isshu.

Lady Kii of Princess Yūshi's Household (祐子内親王家紀伊, Yūshi Naishinnō-ke no Kii, dates unknown), also known as Ichinomiya no Kii (一宮紀伊), was a waka poet and Japanese noblewoman active in the Heian period. She is traditionally enumerated as one of the Thirty-Six Female Immortals of Poetry (女房三十六歌仙, Nyōbō Sanjūrokkasen). Her works were featured in several imperial poetry anthologies, including Shingoshūi Wakashū, Senzai Wakashū, Shokugosen Wakashū, Gyokuyō Wakashū, Shinsenzai Wakashū, Shinchokusen Wakashū, and others.

== Poetry ==
One of her poems is included in the Ogura Hyakunin Isshu:

音に聞く高師の浦のあだ波は
かけじや袖の濡れもこそすれ
oto ni kiku Takashi-no-hama no adanami wa
kakeji ya sode no nure mo koso sure
(Kin'yō Wakashū 8:469)
