= Fujiwara no Chikako =

Japanese noblewoman and poet

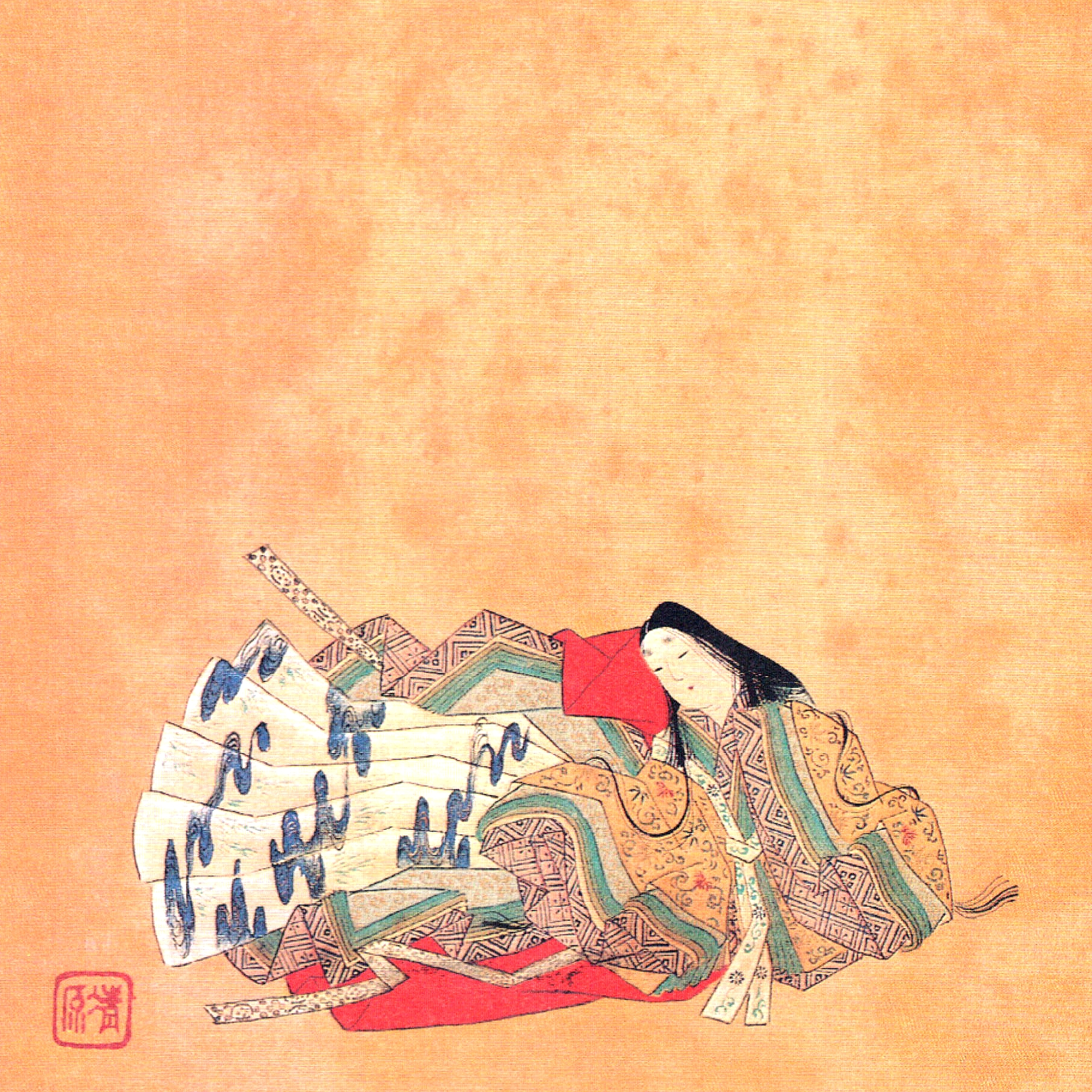
Fujiwara no Chikako

Fujiwara no Chikako (藤原親子 dates unknown) was a waka poet and Japanese noblewoman active in the Kamakura period. She is designated as a member of the Thirty-Six Female Immortals of Poetry (女房三十六歌仙, Nyōbō Sanjūrokkasen). She is also known as Go-Saga In no Chūnagon Naishi no Suke (後嵯峨院中納言典侍) and Naishi no Suke Chikako Ason (典侍親子朝臣).
