= Gishūmon'in no Tango =

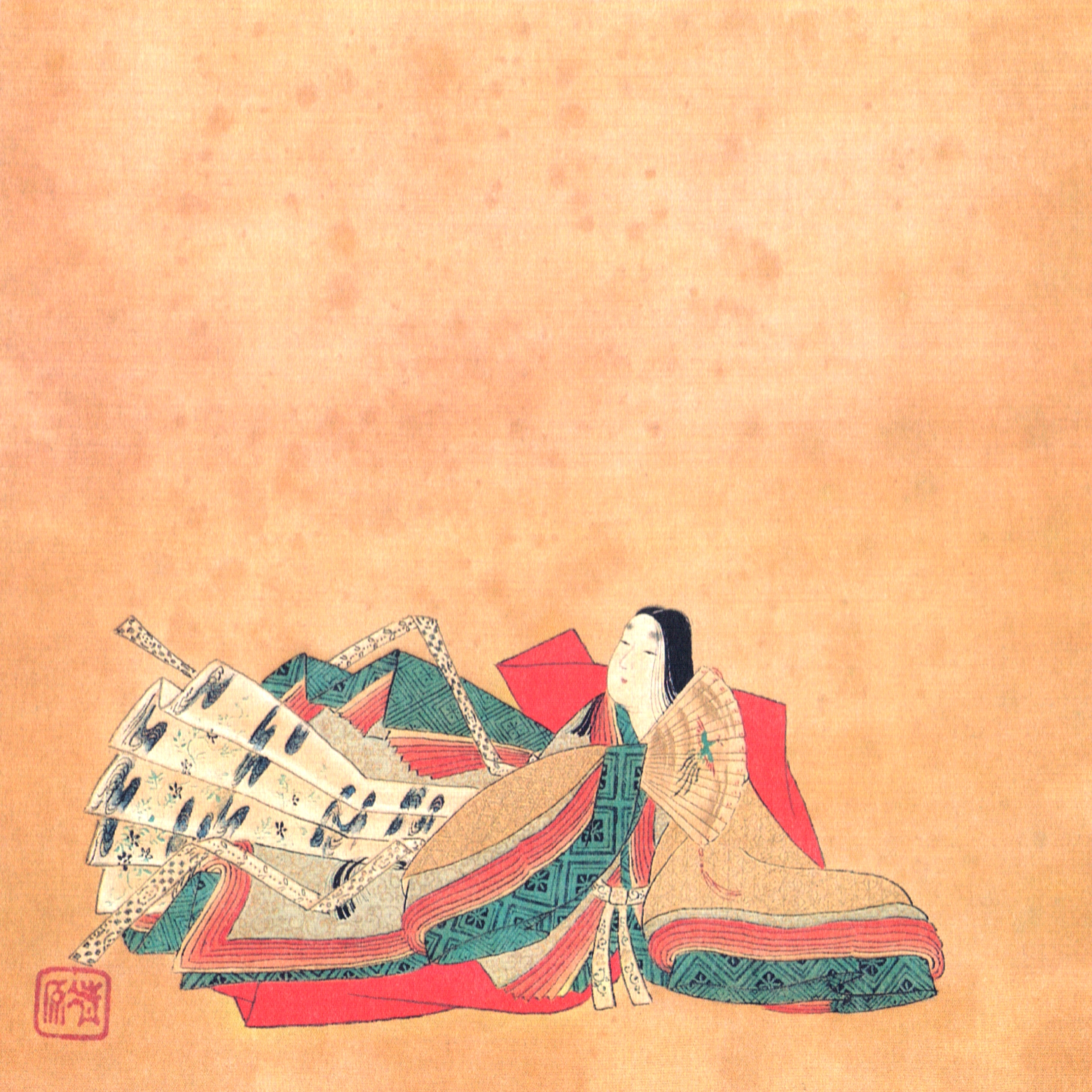
Gishūmon'in no Tango

Gishūmon'in no Tango (宜秋門院丹後, dates unknown) was a waka poet and Japanese noblewoman active in the late Heian period and early Kamakura period. Her work appears in a large number of imperial poetry collections, including Shingoshūi Wakashū, Senzai Wakashū, Shokugosen Wakashū, Gyokuyō Wakashū, Shinsenzai Wakashū, Shinchokusen Wakashū, and others. She is designated as a member of the Female Thirty-Six Immortals of Poetry (女房三十六歌仙, Nyōbō Sanjūrokkasen). She is also known as Tango no Zenni (丹後禅尼).

Gishūmon'in no Tango competed in a poetry competition held in 1204 judged by Fujiwara no Teika, in which she paired opposite the male poet Fujiwara no Tadayoshi; she defeated him in two rounds and tied in a third. She took Buddhist vows as a nun in 1201 but continued writing poetry until at least 1208.
