= Sōhekimon'in no Shōshō =

Sōhekimon'in no Shōshō (藻璧門院少将, dates unknown) was a waka poet and Japanese noblewoman active in the Kamakura period. Sixty of her poems appear in imperial poetry collections, including Shingoshūi Wakashū, Senzai Wakashū, Shokugosen Wakashū, Gyokuyō Wakashū, Shinsenzai Wakashū, Shinchokusen Wakashū, and others. She is designated as a member of the Female Thirty-Six Immortals of Poetry (女房三十六歌仙, Nyōbō Sanjūrokkasen). She is also known as Chūgū no Shōshō (中宮少将).
