= Crónica Electrónica =

- Founded: 2003
- Founder: Miguel Carvalhais; Pedro Tudela; Lia; João Cruz; Paulo Vinhas; Pedro Almeida
- Genre: Experimental, Electronic, Sound art
- Country of origin: Portugal
- Location: Porto
- Official website: cronicaelectronica.org

Crónica Electrónica, also known as Crónica, is an independent media-label based in Porto, Portugal. Founded in 2003 by Miguel Carvalhais, Pedro Tudela, Lia, João Cruz, Paulo Vinhas and Pedro Almeida, it publishes experimental sound and visual artists.
Originally formed around a small group of Portuguese artists, Crónica eventually expanded its roster to include international musicians and sound artists.
Since 2005, Crónica organizes a free annual event in Porto which is "simultaneous the celebration of the label's anniversary, a gathering of friends and lovers of experimental music and an offer to the city" it operates in.

== Releases ==
Although many releases adhere to the standard CD format, among its outputs one can find two main alternative series that try to explore and expand the curatorial role of a music label and the potential of digital distribution.

=== Unlimited ===
The Unlimited release series are digital-only releases, available either as free downloads or as commercial editions from online retailers.

=== Limited ===
The Limited releases present physical goods which come in diverse formats, ranging from prints to objects or hand-cut vinyls. All of these are numbered and signed by the artist and are available in very limited quantities.

== Broadcast ==
=== Futurónica ===
Futurónica was a radio program produced by the label, broadcast fortnightly by Rádio Zero (from 2009 to 2017) and Rádio Manobras (from 2011 to 2017).

=== Crónicaster ===
From 2005 to 2016, Crónica published 122 releases of a podcast, Crónicaster, in which were presented label-related pieces, such as radio broadcasts, live performances and remixes.

== Recognition ==
Although the notability in Portugal, beyond a circle of musicians and some attentive followers of the label's activity, is diminished, the European and international panorama is quite different. It has become a reference in European experimental music and sound art.

Crónica has been praised for being a well curated label. It was compared to Mego, but the distinction became clear over time; Crónica uses noise without making noise music, and stands on a smaller, more targeted niche.

Their catalogue has been described as sharp and demanding, encompassing a diverse genres, such as electro-acoustic music, ambient, minimal music, improvised jazz and field-recordings.

In 2006, Crónica was present at the Sónar Festival in Barcelona. Miguel Carvalhais and Return (João Cruz) performed a set that showcased future releases.

== Artists ==
- @c
- agf
- Alessio Ballerini
- Àlex Reviriego
- Alexander Rishaug
- Alfredo Costa Monteiro
- Ana Guedes
- André Gonçalves
- Angélica Salvi
- Arlene Tucker
- Artificial Memory Trace
- Arturas Bumšteinas
- Attilio Novellino
- Autodigest
- Boca Raton
- Bruno Duplant
- Budhaditya Chattopadhyay
- Cáncer
- Carlos Santos
- Cecilia Quinteros
- Cem Güney
- Christof Migone
- Coeval
- Daniel Bisig
- Dan Powell
- Darius Čiuta
- David Lee Myers
- David Maranha
- Davor Mikan
- Dawn Scarfe
- Diogo Alvim
- Drumming GP
- Durán Vázquez
- Edu Comelles
- Emidio Buchinho
- Emitter
- Emmanuel Mieville
- Enrico Coniglio
- Ephraim Wegner
- Eric La Casa
- Fernando Godoy
- Francisco López
- Freiband
- Gigantiq
- Gilles Aubry
- Gintas K
- Giuseppe Cordaro
- Graeme Truslove
- Guido Flichman
- Guy Dowsett
- Haarvöl
- Hannes Strobl
- Heimir Björgúlfsson
- Helgi Thorsson
- Hugo Olim
- Ifs
- Ilia Belorukov
- Isabel Latorre
- James Eck Rippie
- Janek Schaefer
- Jazznoise
- Jérôme Noetinger
- Jim Haynes
- João Castro Pinto
- John Grzinich
- Jonas Ohlsson
- Jos Smolders
- J.L. Maire
- Julia Weinmann
- Jura Laiva
- Kunrad
- Lawrence English
- Lemures
- Lia
- Longina
- Luca Forcucci
- Lucas Alvarado
- Luís Antero
- Luis Marte
- Machinefabriek
- Mad Disc
- Marc Behrens
- Marius Watz
- Marla Hlady
- Martijn Tellinga
- Máquina Magnética
- Mathias Delplanque
- Matilde Meireles
- Mestre André
- Miguel Flor
- Miguel A. García
- Miguel Leal
- Mikel R. Nieto
- Mise_en_scene
- Monrhea
- Monty Adkins
- Morten Riis
- Mosaique
- Nicola Di Croce
- Nicolas Bernier
- o.blaat
- Ok.Suitcase
- Oriol Rosell
- Oscar Martin
- Øyvind Brandtsegg
- paL
- Paulo Raposo
- Pawel Grabowski
- Pedro Rebelo
- Pedro Tudela
- Philippe Petit
- Philip Samartzis
- Pimmon
- Piotr Kurek
- Porcje Rosołowe
- Pure
- Quarz
- Ran Slavin
- Return
- Ricardo Guerreiro
- Richard Eigner
- Roel Meelkop
- Rutger Zuydervelt
- Sara Pinheiro
- Saverio Rosi
- Simon Cummings
- Simon Whetham
- Síria
- Sound Meccano
- Stephan Mathieu
- Stephen Vitiello
- Stefan Nussbaumer
- Sumugan Sivanesan
- Sun Dog
- TAMTAM
- Tarab
- tilia
- The Beautiful Schizophonic
- Trondheim EMP
- TU M'
- Tuulikki Bartosik
- UBERMORGEN.COM
- Ulrich Mitzlaff
- Vacuamoenia
- Viktorija Makauskaitė
- Vitor Joaquim
- Xoán-Xil López
- Yiorgis Sakellariou

== Cover artists ==
- Alessandro Segalini
- Aki Onda
- Andrea Bolognino
- Andy Fullalove
- Arménio Martins
- Barbara Says…
- Bruno Duplant
- C.E.B.Reas
- Chris Kondek
- Christina Vantzou
- Clovis Vallois
- David Lee Myers
- David Muth
- Estelle Chaigne
- Heitor Alvelos
- Helen Cho
- Hugo Olim
- Hugo Oliveira
- Insert Silence (Amit Pitaru & James Paterson)
- Jan Robert Leegte
- Jan Rohlf
- Jewboy Co.
- João Cruz
- José Carneiro
- Julia Weinmann
- Lia
- Maite Mugerza
- Marc Behrens
- Mário Moura
- Marius Waltz
- Matilde Meireles
- Miguel Leal
- Pedro de Sousa Pereira
- Pedro Tudela
- re-p.org (Maia Gusberti)
- roav
- Rosemary Lee
- Rui Vitorino Santos
- Rutger Zuydervelt
- Simon Whetham
- Skurktur
- Stephen Harvey
- Steve Roden
- Tami Wiesel

== Catalogue ==
Title	Artist	Cat N.	Format
30xN — AZL2	@c + Visiophone	Crónica 256~2026	digital release
PreAtmosfera	Gintas K	Crónica 255~2026	digital release
Attuning To / Resonating with (Aomori)	Nicola di Croce	Crónica 254~2026	digital release
Antithesis	Roel Meelkop	Crónica 253~2026	CD
30xN — VRM1	@c + Visiophone	Crónica 252~2026	digital release
Instantanés Détériorés	Jérôme Noetinger & Les Persécutions de Strasbourg	Crónica 251~2026	digital release
On And On And Off	Marla Hlady & Christof Migone	Crónica 250~2026	CD
Música para Mysterious Heart	Diogo Alvim	Crónica 249~2026	CD
Four Tales	Matilde Meireles	Crónica 248~2026	CD
30xN — LRJ2	@c + Visiophone	Crónica 247~2026	digital release
Two (Another Way)	Matilde Meireles	Crónica 246~2026	digital release
Spelonk	Machinefabriek	Crónica 245~2026	CD
Cais do Sodré	Hannes Strobl	Crónica 244~2025	digital release
Vinum Sabbati: In the Dawn of Science Fiction	Durán Vázquez + Kloob	Crónica 243~2025	CD
30xN — LRJ1	@c + Visiophone	Crónica 242~2025	digital release
Electromagnetism of the City	Emitter	Crónica 241~2025	CD
INvolution	Monrhea & agf	Crónica 240~2025	digital release
Terrenus	David Lee Myers	Crónica 239~2025	CD
Horizons of Suspended Zones	Haarvöl	Crónica 238~2025	CD
L'Écoute Tactile	J.L. Maire & Alfredo Costa Monteiro	Crónica 237~2025	digital release
NRD DRM TWO 2022-2024	Ilia Belorukov	Crónica 236~2025	CD
30xN — VRD1	@c + Visiophone	Crónica 235~2025	digital release
aida	Arturas Bumšteinas & Viktorija Makauskaitė	Crónica 234~2025	digital release
Closing Our Eyes	Philippe Petit	Crónica 233~2025	CD
Qadira	Cecilia Quinteros	Crónica 232~2025	digital release
Diffraction	Hannes Strobl	Crónica 231~2025	digital release
Kleine Geluiden	Kunrad	Crónica 230~2025	CD
Expansão	@c + Jérôme Noetinger	Crónica 229~2025	digital release
Attractive Apesanteur	Philippe Petit	Crónica 228~2024	digital release
Laliguras	Miguel A. García & Coeval	Crónica 227~2024	digital release
Repetition and Memory	Emitter	Crónica 226~2024	digital release
Successive Actions	Simon Whetham	Crónica 225~2024	CD
Weben Song	Hannes Strobl	Crónica 224~2024	digital release
Loop. And Again.	Matilde Meireles	Crónica 223~2024	CD
Installations: CX LUX (2017)	@c	Crónica 222~2024	digital release
Écouter les fantômes	Bruno Duplant	Crónica 221~2024	CD
Clould	Marc Behrens	Crónica 220~2024	CD
Heralds de l'hiver	Miguel A. García & Àlex Reviriego	Crónica 219~2024	digital release
Aiear	Marc Behrens	Crónica 218~2024	digital release
Mahe Man / Mau Jeito	Síria	Crónica 217~2024	digital release
Textuur 2 [||||----]	Jos Smolders	Crónica 216~2024	CD
Transformation Sonor	Hannes Strobl	Crónica 215~2024	digital release
Textuur 3 [Register]	Jos Smolders	Crónica 214~2024	digital release
Installations: (Re)Verso/Flexo (2018)	@c	Crónica 213~2024	digital release
A Divine Comedy	Philippe Petit	Crónica 212~2024	2CD
20 Years × 180 Minutes	Crónica	Crónica 211~2023	digital release
20 + 20: 30 artists celebrate 30 years of Neural + 20 of Crónica	Various Artists	Crónica 210~2023	7" flexi disc
Installations: Octo _ _ _ _ (2019)	@c	Crónica 209~2023	digital release
Luci Fisse + Luci Erranti	Enrico Coniglio	Crónica 208~2023	digital release
Lisboa Soa, Sounds Within Sounds	Various Artists	Crónica 207~2023	CD
Eraginie	Miguel A. García	Crónica 206~2023	CD
Vanishing Points	Matilde Meireles	Crónica 205~2023	digital release
Drinking the Acheron River at Its Source	Philippe Petit	Crónica 204~2023	digital release
Strange Attractors	David Lee Myers	Crónica 203~2023	CD
Huncill	Miguel A. García & Coeval	Crónica 202~2023	digital release
Viva in Pace	Roel Meelkop	Crónica 201~2023	CD
For Percussion	@c + Drumming GP	Crónica 200~2023	CD
Withering Field Live	Budhaditya Chattopadhyay	Crónica 199~2023	digital release
Terra	Luca Forcucci	Crónica 198~2023	CD
Stromschauen Live	TAMTAM	Crónica 197~2023	digital release
Swan Song	Marla Hlady & Christof Migone	Crónica 196~2023	2CD
Scattered Underfoot	Ilia Belorukov	Crónica 195~2023	MC
Installations: S(o)al (2021)	@c	Crónica 194~2022	digital release
As Things Flow (for Waters' Witness)	André Gonçalves + Angélica Salvi	Crónica 193~2022	digital release
Col des Tempètes	Sun Dog	Crónica 192~2022	CD
The Uncanny Organization of Timeless Time	Haarvöl + Xoán-Xil López	Crónica 191~2022	CD
(Un)Folding	Emidio Buchinho & Ricardo Guerreiro	Crónica 190~2022	digital release
Withering Field	Budhaditya Chattopadhyay	Crónica 189~2022	CD
Sombres Miroirs	Bruno Duplant	Crónica 188~2022	CD
Eleven Songs	TAMTAM	Crónica 187~2022	digital release
Lad enhver lyd minde os om and Lad den samme lyd minde os om	Morten Riis	Crónica 186~2022	MC
Lėti	Gintas K	Crónica 185~2022	CD
Persistent Disequilibrium	Øyvind Brandtsegg	Crónica 184~2022	digital release
Remote Communion	Monty Adkins	Crónica 183~2022	digital release
Stromschauen	TAMTAM	Crónica 182~2022	digital release
Installations / Instalações	Pedro Tudela & Miguel Carvalhais	Crónica 181~2022	Book
Life of a Potato	Matilde Meireles	Crónica 180~2022	MC
Installations: LMY-7-10 (2016)	@c	Crónica 179~2022	digital release
Evhiblig	Miguel A. García	Crónica 178~2021	digital release
Material Compositions	Mad Disc	Crónica 177~2021	MC
Máquina Magnética	Máquina Magnética	Crónica 176~2021	CD
With Love. From an Invader.	Monty Adkins	Crónica 175~2021	digital release
Installations: Seis Elementos (2016)	@c	Crónica 174~2021	digital release
Reduced to a Geometrical Point	David Lee Myers	Crónica 173~2021	CD
La Ausencia Como Lenguaje	Lucas Alvarado	Crónica 172~2021	digital release
Degti	Yiorgis Sakellariou	Crónica 171~2021	MC
Four Walks at Old Chapel	Dan Powell	Crónica 170~2021	MC
Submerge-Emerge	Jos Smolders	Crónica 169~2021	2CD
GML Variations	@c	Crónica 168~2021	CD
Exile and Other Syndromes	Budhaditya Chattopadhyay	Crónica 167~2021	digital release
DSB	Francisco López	Crónica 166~2021	MC
GML Vars. Live	@c	Crónica 168s~2021	digital release
Nancarrow Biotope	Øyvind Brandtsegg	Crónica 165~2020	MC
Deus Sive Natura	Nicola di Croce	Crónica 164~2020	digital release
Crossmodulated	Roel Meelkop	Crónica 163~2020	MC
Deriva	Various Artists	Crónica 162~2020	MC
Listen to me	Pedro Rebelo	Crónica 161~2020	MC
Auditório	Pedro Tudela	Crónica 160~2020	box-set and digital release
Sunnyside	Matilde Meireles	Crónica 159~2020	digital release
Kularrate	Miguel A. García & Oscar Martin	Crónica 158~2020	digital release
L'incertitude	Rutger Zuydervelt & Bruno Duplant	Crónica 157~2020	MC
A100	TAMTAM	Crónica 156~2020	digital release
Boa-Língua	Síria	Crónica 155~2020	MC
Orgelsafari	Arturas Bumšteinas	Crónica 154~2020	digital release
Captured Space	Philip Samartzis & Eric La Casa	Crónica 153~2020	MC
-O-R-G-A-N-	Mise_en_scene	Crónica 152~2019	MC
Ekkert Nafn	Francisco López & Miguel A. García	Crónica 151~2019	CD
Espaço, Pausa, Repetição	@c	Crónica 150~2019	MC
Clorofila Voyeur	Guido Flichman	Crónica 149~2019	digital release
Unwritten Rules for a Ceaseless Journey	Haarvöl + Xoán-Xil López	Crónica 148~2019	CD
Jetzt	Ephraim Wegner & Daniel Bisig	Crónica 147~2019	digital release
Poke It With A Stick / Joining The Bots	Trondheim EMP	Crónica 146~2019	2CD
Sound	Luís Antero & Darius Čiuta	Crónica 145~2019	digital release
For Pauline	Isabel Latorre & Edu Comelles	Crónica 144~2018	MC
Rheingold	Tamtam	Crónica 143~2018	MC
Cuspo	Síria	Crónica 142~2018	MC
Panphonia	Vacuamoenia	Crónica 141~2018	digital release
Moeror	Monty Adkins	Crónica 140~2018	digital release
間	Simon Cummings	Crónica 139~2018	MC
Témoins	Mathias Delplanque	Crónica 138~2018	MC
Manifold Basketball	Ifs	Crónica 137~2018	digital release
Obex	Tarab + Artificial Memory Trace	Crónica 136~2018	MC
At Cuckmere	Dan Powell	Crónica 135~2017	digital release
Superpositions	David Lee Myers	Crónica 134~2017	MC
Shadows and Reflections	Monty Adkins	Crónica 133~2017	MC
Constellation / Deformation	Mise_en_scene	Crónica 132~2017	digital release
Stikhiya	Yiorgis Sakellariou	Crónica 131~2017	MC
Intuited Architectures	Graeme Truslove	Crónica 130~2017	CD
Hiku Komuro, Hikikomori	Durán Vázquez	Crónica 129~2017	MC
The Waste Land	Luca Forcucci	Crónica 128~2017	MC
Digital Junkies in Strange Times	Ran Slavin	Crónica 127~2017	digital release
Juryo: Durée de la vie de l'ainsi-venu	Emmanuel Mieville	Crónica 126~2017	CD
.appnd	μo	Crónica 125~2017	digital release
Under My Skin	Gintas K	Crónica 124~2017	MC
Nowhere: Exercises in Modular Synthesis and Field Recording	Jos Smolders	Crónica 123~2017	CD
Igavene Olevik	James Alexander Wyness	Corollaries 12 / Crónica 122~2016	digital release
Gleaners	Tarab	Corollaries 11 / Crónica 121~2016	digital release
Hypnomatic	Arlene Tucker & Guy Dowsett	Corollaries 10 / Crónica 120~2016	digital release
Urban Dialog	TAMTAM	Crónica 119~2016	digital release
Alone Together	Dawn Scarfe	Corollaries 9 / Crónica 118~2016	digital release
Geography	Vitor Joaquim	Crónica 117~2016	CD
Primary Reception	Tuulikki Bartosik	Corollaries 8 / Crónica 116~2016	digital release
Throttle and Calibration	Jim Haynes	Corollaries 7 / Crónica 115~2016	digital release
Prevailing Wind, Tangled Under	John Grzinich	Corollaries 6 / Crónica 114~2016	digital release
X-RUN-4 Prismatique	Ulrich Mitzlaff	Crónica 113~2016	digital release
Is the space empty, only to be filled with the energy of this voice?	Fernando Godoy	Corollaries 5 / Crónica 112~2016	digital release
Three-Body Problem	@c	Crónica 111~2016	CD
Sireli Aeg	Sound Meccano / Jura Laiva	Corollaries 4 / Crónica 110~2016	digital release
Bittersweet Melodies	Ran Slavin	Crónica 109~2016	CD
Thermo Swing & Quanta+Else / Studio Blanks 01-02	Ran Slavin	Crónica 108~2016	digital release
Contact	Simon Whetham	Corollaries 3 / Crónica 107~2016	digital release
Primary Fields	Mise_en_scene	Crónica 106~2016	digital release
Roha	Andreas Trobollowitsch	Crónica 105~2016	CD
When the Days All Tip from Nests and Fly Down Roads	Richard Eigner	Corollaries 2 / Crónica 104~2016	digital release
Against Nature	Simon Whetham	Crónica 103~2016	CD
Everything Emanating from the Sun	Yiorgis Sakellariou	Corollaries 1 / Crónica 102~2016	digital release
The Venus of Pistoletto	Emídio Buchinho & Carlos Santos	Crónica 101~2016	digital release
Gamelan Descending a Staircase	Arturas Bumšteinas	Crónica 100~2015	CD
Loud Listening Murano	Various Artists	Crónica 099~2015	digital release
Modular Works 2015Q1	Jos Smolders	Crónica 098~2015	digital release
Positions	Martijn Tellinga	Crónica 097~2015	CD / digital release
Siebzehn bis ∞	Various Artists	Crónica 096~2015	digital release
Lanificio Leo	Attilio Novellino / Saverio Rosi	Crónica 095~2015	digital release
Unfurling Streams	Monty Adkins	Crónica 094~2015	CD / digital release
Insects 4-7	Porcje Rosołowe	Crónica 093~2015	digital release
Ma.Org Pa.Git Re.Mx	Alexander Rishaug & Various Artists	Crónica 092~2015	digital release
Ma.Org Pa.Git	Alexander Rishaug	Crónica 091~2015	LP / digital release
W.o.W. – Wand of Watt	Emidio Buchinho & Ricardo Guerreiro	Crónica 090~2014	digital release
The Sound of Underwater Friction Produced by Movement	Mikel R. Nieto	Crónica 089~2014	digital release
Transmissions	Mathias Delplanque	Crónica 088~2014	CD / digital release
(ANT(i)SOM)	Luís Antero	Crónica 087~2014	digital release
Residual Forms	Monty Adkins	Crónica 086~2014	digital release
Ab OVO	@c	Crónica 085~2014	CD / digital release
Concret-Sens	Emmanuel Mieville	Crónica 084~2013	digital release
Lemuria	Lemures	Crónica 083~2013	12" Vinyl / digital release
EP	Lemures	Crónica 082~2013	AIFF / MP3
Meubles	Arturas Bumšteinas	Crónica 081~2013	digital release
Water-Nature-City	Cem Güney	Crónica 080~2013	digital release
No End of Vinyl	Pure	Crónica 079~2013	CD
The End of Vinyl	Pure	Crónica 078~2013	AIFF / MP3
Half-Life, Still Life	@c	Crónica 077~2013	AIFF / MP3
Queendom Maybe Rise	Marc Behrens	Crónica 076~2013	CD
443	Mise_en_scene	Crónica 075~2013	AIFF / MP3
Monnom / Hertz, Gigahertz	Miguel A. García / Durán Vázquez	Crónica 074~2013	AIFF / MP3
Never So Alone	Simon Whetham	Crónica 073~2013	CD
Jakov & Gwizdały	Arturas Bumšteinas	Crónica 072~2012	AIFF / MP3
Eiffel	Luis Marte	Crónica 071~2012	AIFF / MP3
Five Years on Cold Asphalt	Quarz	Crónica 070~2012	CD
eins bis sechzehn	Ephraim Wegner & Julia Weinmann	Crónica 069~2012	CD
Heat	Piotr Kurek	Crónica 068~2012	AIFF / MP3
Loud Listening	Various Artists	Crónica 067~2012	AIFF / MP3
Untitled #284	Francisco López	Crónica 066~2012	CD
Crossovers	Various Artists	Crónica 065~2012	AIFF / MP3
Strings	Stephan Mathieu & David Maranha	Crónica 064~2012	LP
Mic.Madeira	Simon Whetham & Hugo Olim	Crónica 063~2011	DVD
Double Exposure	Janek Schaefer	Crónica 062~2011	AIFF / MP3
Poststop	The Futureplaces Impromptu All-Stars Orchestra	Crónica 061~2011	CD
Leftovers (Reworked)	Shinkei + Mise_en_scene	Crónica 060~2011	AIFF / MP3
Humus (2005-2010)	Jazznoize	Crónica 059~2011	AIFF / MP3
Ulrich Seidl E.P.	Oriol Rosell	Crónica 058~2011	AIFF
Acute Inbetweens	Lawrence English + Stephen Vitiello	Crónica 057~2011	CD
Homem Fantasma	@c	Crónica 056~2011	Apple Lossless / MP3
Pastoral	Arturas Bumšteinas	Crónica 055~2010	Apple Lossless / MP3
So On	Gintas K	Crónica 054~2010	Apple Lossless / MP3
strings.lines	Nicolas Bernier	Crónica 053~2010	CD
Audible Landscapes	Ephraim Wegner	Crónica 052~2010	Apple Lossless / MP3
Shattering Silence	Mosaique	Crónica 051~2010	Apple Lossless / MP3
Crónica L	Various Artists	Crónica 050~2010	CD
The Mediterranean Drift	Ran Slavin	Crónica 049~2010	Apple Lossless / MP3
Passeports	Mathias Delplanque	Crónica 048~2010	CD
Fifty Inner Spaces (for JG Ballard) / Girl	Janek Schaefer / Stephan Mathieu	Crónica 047~2009	5" vinyl
Sleppet	Marc Behrens	Crónica 046~2009	CD
Home, Sweet Home	Durán Vázquez	Crónica 045~2009	Apple Lossless / MP3
Erotikon	The Beautiful Schizophonic	Crónica 044~2009	CD
The Sound of eBay — Do you know who the father is?, The Sound of eBay — It's getting big?	UBERMORGEN.COM	Crónica 043L~2009	Woodcut on paper
1001 Songs of eBay	UBERMORGEN.COM && Nussbaumer	Crónica 043~2009	MP3
Lectures	Piotr Kurek	Crónica 042~2009	CD
The Recompiler	Marc Behrens	Crónica 041L~2009	Lambda print
Compilation Works 1996-2005	Marc Behrens	Crónica 041~2009	Apple Lossless / MP3
Lovely Banalities	Gintas K	Crónica 040~2009	CD
Conical	Marius Watz	Crónica 039L~2009	Archival Inkjet prints
Digital Sound Drawings	Morten Riis	Crónica 039~2009	AIFF
Ification	Pure	Crónica 038~2008	CD
Nocturnal Rainbow Rising	Ran Slavin	Crónica 037L~2008	Lambda print
Nocturnal Rainbow Rising	Ran Slavin	Crónica 037~2008	Apple Lossless / MP3
Berlin Backyards	Gilles Aubry	Crónica 036~2008	CD
Unique Clouds	Miguel Leal	Crónica 035L~2008	Rubber stamps
Is That You?	TU M'	Crónica 035~2008	Apple Lossless / MP3
Praxis	Cem Güney	Crónica 034~2008	CD
DarkRoseSoundFlower	Pedro Tudela	Crónica 033L~2008	Lambda print
Filare	Mosaique	Crónica 033~2008	Apple Lossless / MP3
Mus*****c	Various Artists	Crónica 032~2008	Apple Lossless / MP3
Up, Down, Charm, Strange, Top, Bottom	@c	Crónica 031~2008	CD
Täuschung	Davor Mikan	Crónica 030~2007	CD
Musicamorosa	The Beautiful Schizophonic	Crónica 029~2007	CD
The Wayward Regional Transmissions	Ran Slavin	Crónica 028~2007	CD
Hidden Name	Stephan Mathieu & Janek Schaefer	Crónica 027~2006	CD
Leise	Freiband	Crónica 026~2006	CD
Flow	Vitor Joaquim	Crónica 025~2006	CD
Lengvai / 60 x one minute audio colours of 2 kHz sound	Gintas K	Crónica 024~2006	2CD
Product	Pawel Grabowski / The Beautiful Schizophonic / James Eck Rippie + Paulo Raposo	Crónica 023~2005	CD
Happiness will befall	Lawrence English	Crónica 022~2005	CD
Essays on Radio: Can I Have 2 Minutes of Your Time?	Various Artists	Crónica 021~2005	DVD
Essays on Radio: Can I Have 2 Minutes of Your Time?	Various Artists	Crónica 020~2005	CD
Product	Freiband / Boca Raton	Crónica 019~2005	CD
King Glitch	Heimir Björgúlfsson & Jonas Ohlsson	Crónica 018~2005	CD
Product	Marc Behrens / Paulo Raposo / @c	Crónica 017~2004	10" Vinyl
A Compressed History of Everything Ever Recorded, Vol. 2: Ubiquitous Eternal Live	Autodigest	Crónica 016~2004	CD
vous rêvez/ vous ne rêvez pas	tilia	Crónica 015~2004	CD
Still Important Somekind Not Normally Seen (Always Not Unfinished)	Björgúlfsson / Pimmon / Thorsson	Crónica 014~2004	CD
T-shirt	Miguel Flor	Crónica 013~2004	T-shirt
Two Novels: Gaze / In the Cochlea	o.blaat	Crónica 012~2004	CD
Product	Ok.Suitcase / Cáncer	Crónica 011~2004	CD
v3	@c	Crónica 010~2004	CD
Product	Ran Slavin	Crónica 009~2004	CD
Further Consequences of Reinterpretation	Paulo Raposo / Marc Behrens	Crónica 008~2004	CD
Product	Sumugan Sivanesan / Durán Vázquez	Crónica 007~2003	CD
A Compressed History of Everything Ever Recorded, Vol. 1	Autodigest	Crónica 006~2003	CD
On Paper	Various Artists	Crónica 005~2003	2CD
La Strada is on Fire (And We Are All Naked)	Vitor Joaquim	Crónica 004~2003	CD
!Siam Acnun	Longina	Crónica 003~2003	CD
Là Où Je Dors	Pedro Tudela	Crónica 002~2003	CD
Hard Disk	@c	Crónica 001~2003	CD
