= Hlady =

Hlady is a surname. Notable people with the surname include:

- Gregory Hlady (born 1954), Ukrainian actor
- Mark Hlady (born 1959), Canadian businessman and politician
- Marla Hlady (born 1965), Canadian kinetic and sound artist

== See also ==
- Suzanne Gavine-Hlady (born 1975), Canadian bobsledder
