= Action of 17 June 1595 =

Naval battle between Malta and Bizerte

- Part of Ottoman–Habsburg Wars
Date	17 june 1595
Location	off Longina, 10 miles south of Syracuse, Sicily
Result	Ottoman victory

Belligerents
(Sovereign Military Order of Malta) Order of Saint John	Ottoman Empire

Commanders and leaders
(Sovereign Military Order of Malta) Claramonte (WIA) (Sovereign Military Order of Malta) Seracourt (WIA)	Murat Reis the Elder

Strength
5 galleys	3 galleys

Casualties and losses
Heavy	Unknown

The Action of 17 June 1595 was a naval battle between forces of Malta, then under the protection of the Order of Saint John, and Bizerte, then part of the Ottoman Empire.

== Battle ==
The Maltese general Claramonte arrived in Messina and found that there was no new presence of the Catholic Armada nor any sign of its assembly. He decided to return to Malta. Upon reaching Syracuse on June 17, he heard news of three galleys spotted off Cape Passaro, thought to be the three from Bizerta under the renowned Corsair Murat Reis the Elder. It was discovered that the Corsair would have laid an ambush at the Fiumara di Longina, 10 miles distant south from Syracuse. Thus, moving forward, at the break of the first watch, the three galleys of Murad were revealed.

Murad quickly spotted the Maltese and retreated. The Galley S. Fede caught up with Murad's galley, but when they pulled off their cannon to shoot them, the Ottomans made a heavy musket discharge, killing many of the Maltese knights and wounding their captain de Seracourt. Amidst the chaos, the chase stopped, which gave time to the Ottomans to escape. Nevertheless, the Maltese continued the chase. When the foremast topsail of a Malta ship was attached to the stern of Murad's galley, an Ottoman soldier managed to cut the attachment with his sword while the Maltese were on the stern. The Ottomans then hailed heavy musket shots, killing or wounding many of the knights.

General Claramonte was also wounded in the fight. San Croce managed to follow up and shot Murad's galley with a cannon shot, killing some of the Ottomans. However, when two ships, Vittoria and San Placido, failed to show up, the Maltese failed to exploit this success. Seeing that the Ottomans were always advancing, he was exhausting his crew in vain, turned the prows, and returned to Syracuse, giving here an honorable burial to the knights who died in that combat.

== Ships involved ==
=== Malta ===
- Capitana
- San Fede
- San Croce
- Vittoria
- San Placido

=== Bizerte ===
3 galleys

== Sources ==
- Anderson, R. C. (1952). Naval Wars in the Levant 1559–1853. Princeton: Princeton University Press.
- Bartolomeo Dal Pozzo (1703), Historia della Sacra religione militare di S. Giovanni Gerosolimitano detta di Malta.
