= Jacques Koeweiden =

Dutch graphic designer

Jacques Koeweiden (born 1957) is a Dutch graphic designer. He was a co-founder of Koeweiden Postma, a Dutch design and communication agency. Koeweiden's design for city branding of Amsterdam during de Coronation Day April 30, 2013 is a part of the collection at Stedelijk museum Amsterdam.

== Education ==
Koeweiden studied graphic design at the Royal Academy of Art and Design in Den Bosch, the Netherlands and studied Sonology at Utrecht University.

== Work ==
In 1987, together with Paul Postma, Koeweiden has founded Dutch design agency Koeweiden Postma. In May 2013 he took farewell after 27 years by him established agency. He has worked since then as an independent designer and creative strategist.

During his career as Creative Director at Koeweiden Postma, Koeweiden was responsible for the concept of the visual identity design including the Van Gogh Museum, HEMA and City Branding of Amsterdam during the coronation of April 30, 2013.

== Awards ==
- City Branding / Logo Coronation for the inauguration of King Willem Alexander in April 2013 has won Red Dot Design Award.
- The visual identity design including the Van Gogh Museum
- The CEDAR Leadership Award for his work on the border of western- and cross-cultural 'design.
- In December 2016, Koeweiden and Paul Postma have received the euvre price from Art Directors Club Netherlands at Stedelijk Museum Amsterdam.

== Membership ==
Koeweiden is the chairman of the Dutch delegation of the Alliance Graphique Internationale Alliance Graphique Internationale and a member of the British D&AD.

He received the CEDAR Leadership Award for his work on the border of western- and cross-cultural 'design. In December 2016, Koeweiden has received the euvre price from Art Directors Club Netherlands at Stedelijk Museum Amsterdam.
