= Murat Reis Mosque =

Former mosque in Rhodes, Greece

- Τζαμί Μουράτ Ρέις
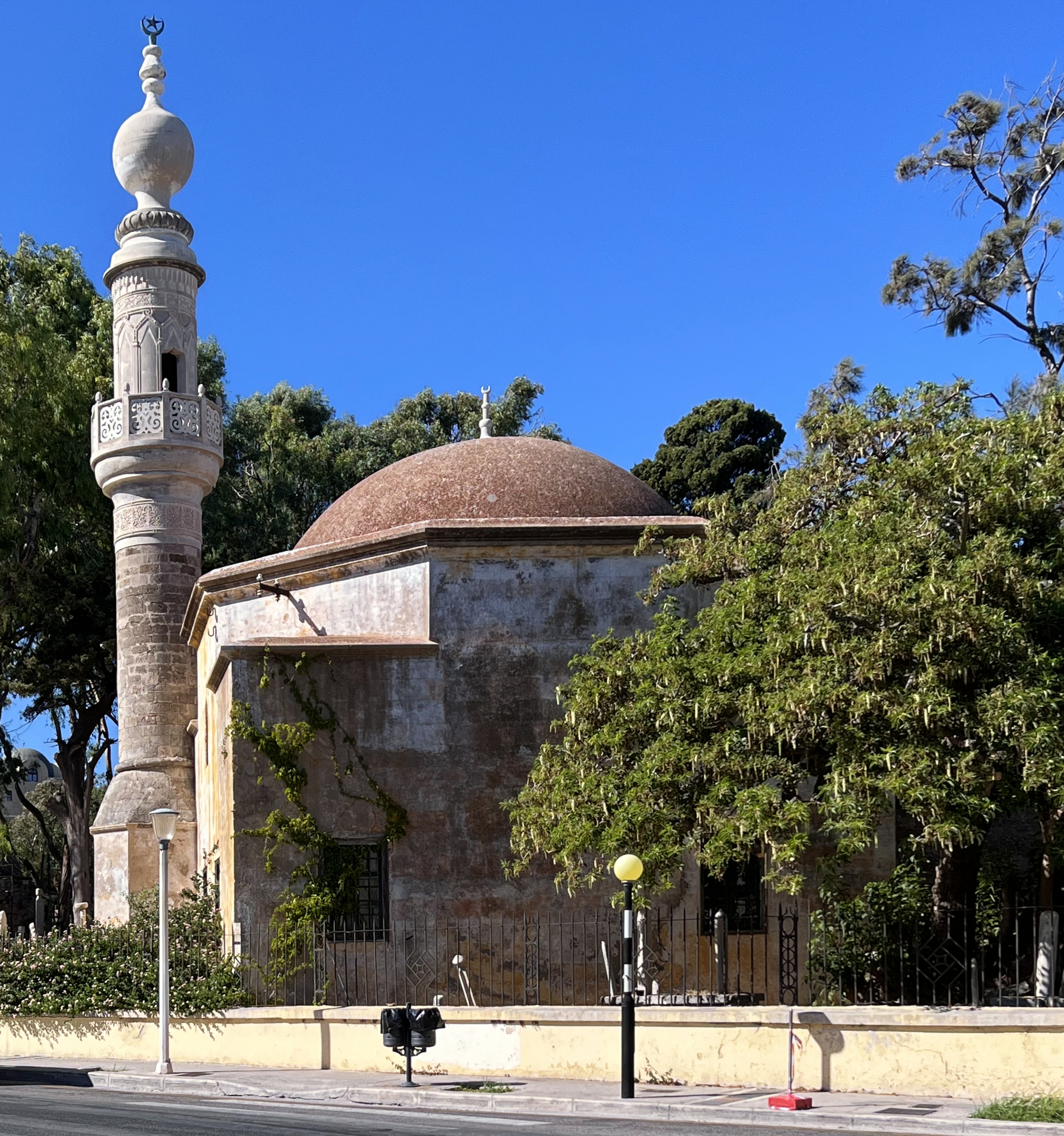

- Location of the former mosque in Greece

Religion
- Affiliation: Sunni Islam (former)
- Ecclesiastical or organizational status: Mosque (1623–1940s)
- Status: Abandoned (as a mosque); Preserved

Location
- Location: Rhodes, South Aegean
- Country: Greece
- Interactive map of Murat Reis Mosque
- Coordinates: 36°27′08″N 28°13′27″E

Architecture
- Type: Mosque
- Style: Ottoman
- Founder: Murat Reis
- Completed: c. 1623

Specifications
- Dome: 1
- Minaret: 1
- Materials: Brick; stone

The Murat Reis Mosque (Greek: Τζαμί Μουράτ Ρέις, from Turkish: Murat Reis Camii) is a former mosque located within the old walled town of Rhodes, on the eponymous island, in the South Aegean region of southern Greece.

Completed in c. 1623 during the Ottoman era, the mosque was named in honour of Murat Reis the Elder, an important admiral of the Ottoman Navy. Abandoned in the 1940s, the former mosque remains intact, although it was in need of restoration and is not open for worship. It is notable for its unusual minaret design, a post-Ottoman addition that replaced the original structure when the island was under Italian administration after the Italo-Turkish War.

== History ==
It was erected around 1623 by Ebubekir Pasha on the site of a previous church dedicated to Saint Anthony in honor of Murat Reis, a prominent Ottoman admiral of the time of Sultan Suleiman the Magnificent. Murat Reis was buried in the graveyard following his death, and his tomb became an object of worship and reverence for the Muslim population of the island as well as the people living across the sea on the Anatolian coast; they would visit the tomb on pilgrimage, carrying lamps and offerings. It was customary to slay animals near the tomb and distribute the meat to the poor.

The building underwent restoration in 1797-1798 by Mourabıt Hassan Bey, who was also eventually buried there. This is evident from the inscription over the door, which states its benefactor and the year it was renovated from almost total ruin.

The mosque's original minaret was destroyed in May 1912 after bombardment during the Italo-Turkish War; it was later rebuilt by the Italians in the shape seen today, and further restored in 1993. Again the complex was damaged in 2013, when the mausoleum collapsed due to severe weather conditions. Following the death of volunteer caretaker Şaban Kargınlıoğlu, the local Greek board for historic monuments seized the mosque and began restoration and conversion from a mosque to a music school.

== Architecture ==
The mosque is located at the bend of the main road that leads from the harbor to the beach.

The prayer hall of the former mosque has a square floor plan, and is adorned with a dome, while the gallery and the tip of the minaret are plastered. A portico stands in front on the northwestern side, composed of three arches that support the wooden ceiling, in accordance with the first type of Bursa that many Turkish mosques were designed. As of 2008 the mosque was in need of restoration.

The wooden minbar is placed to the right of the mihrab, itself a semicircular recess surrounded by two stone columns remarkably devoid of any written text, although it is possible that such text existed once and was later subjected to vandalism.

In the yard, an Ottoman cemetery surrounds the building, in which the tombs of Murat Reis and other significant dignitaries can be seen. Three officers of Suleiman, who seem to have died during the conquest of the island in 1522, are also buried there, indicating that the area was used as a graveyard a full century before the mosque was erected.

== Gallery ==
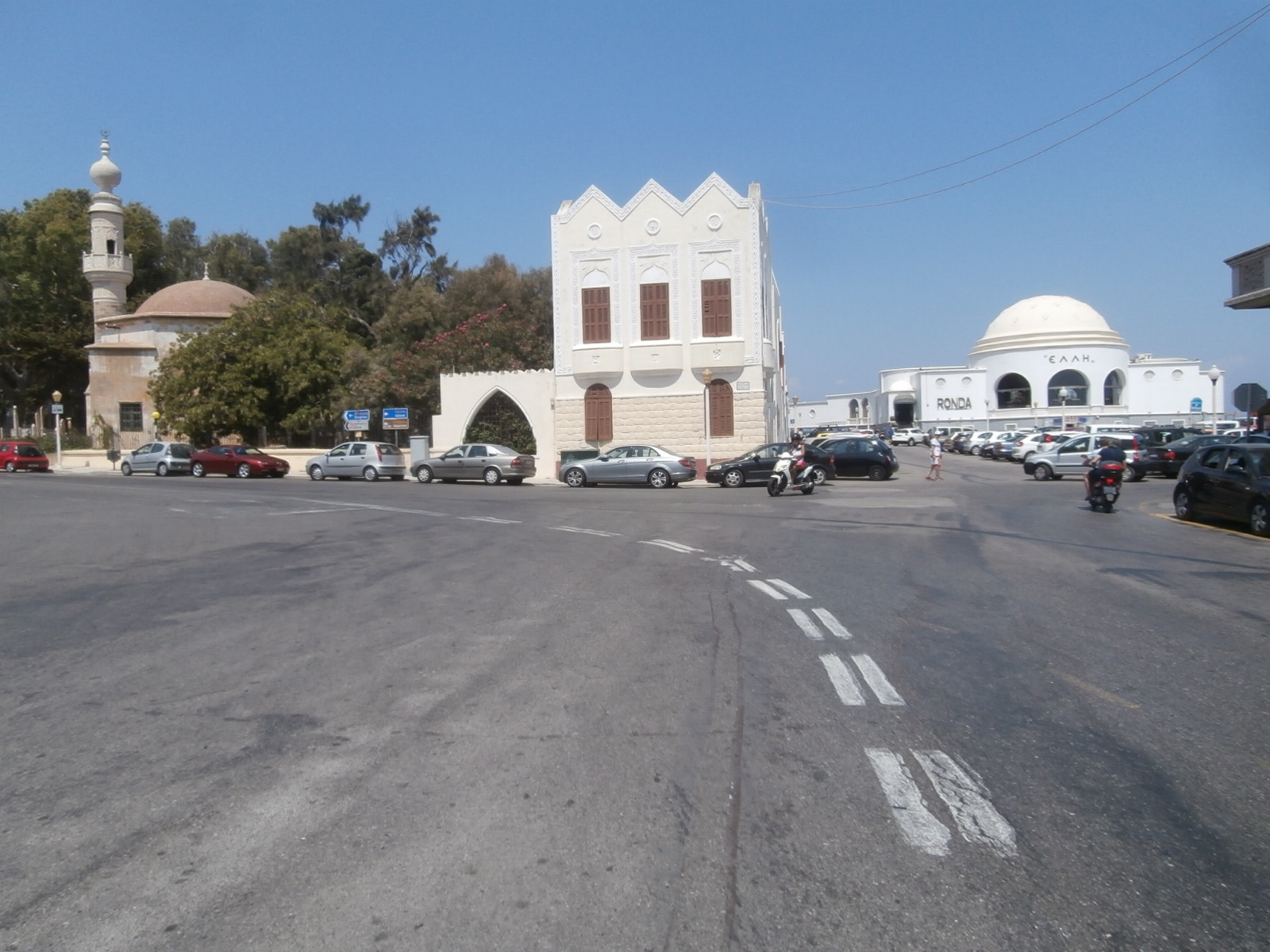
View from the street

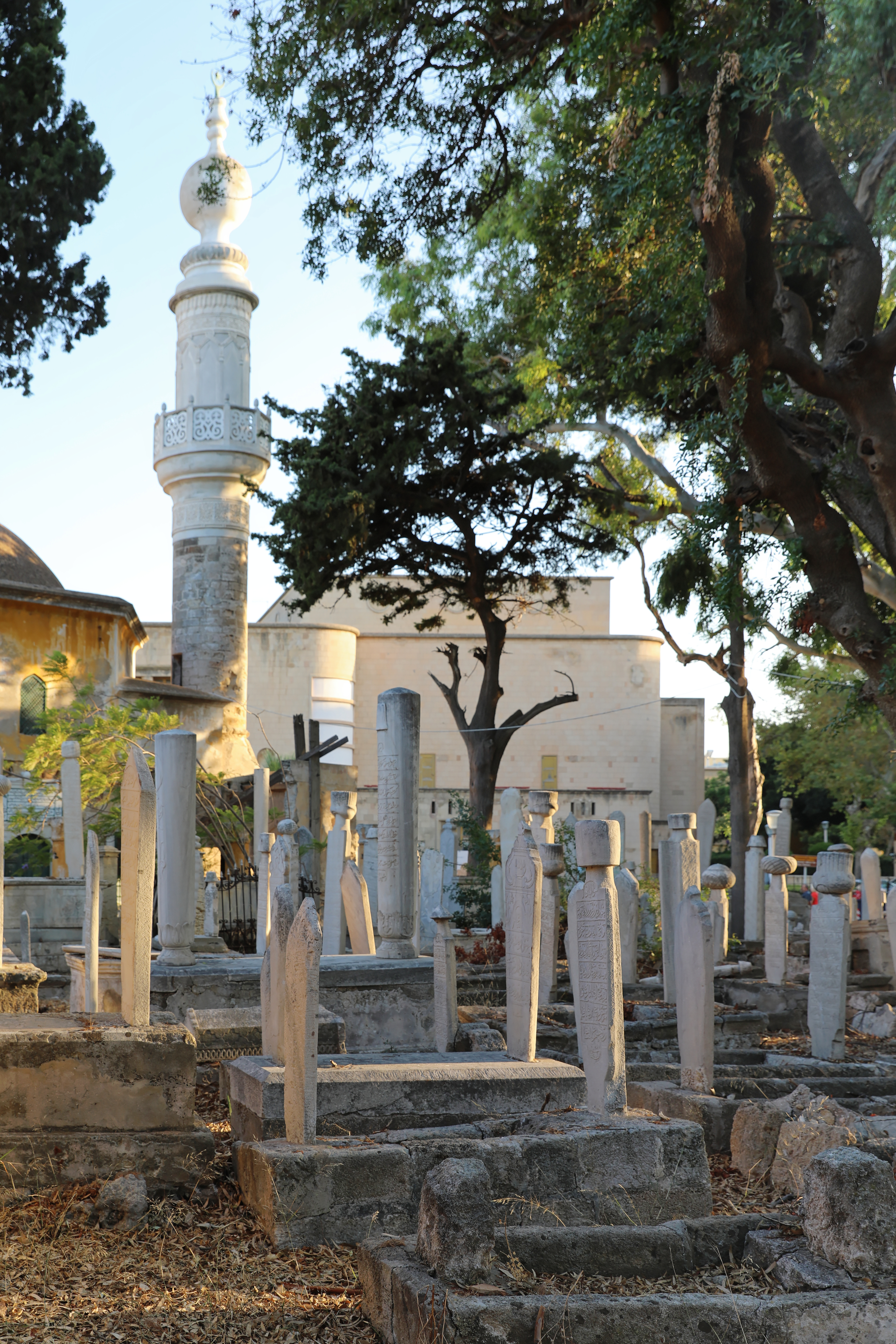
View from the cemetery

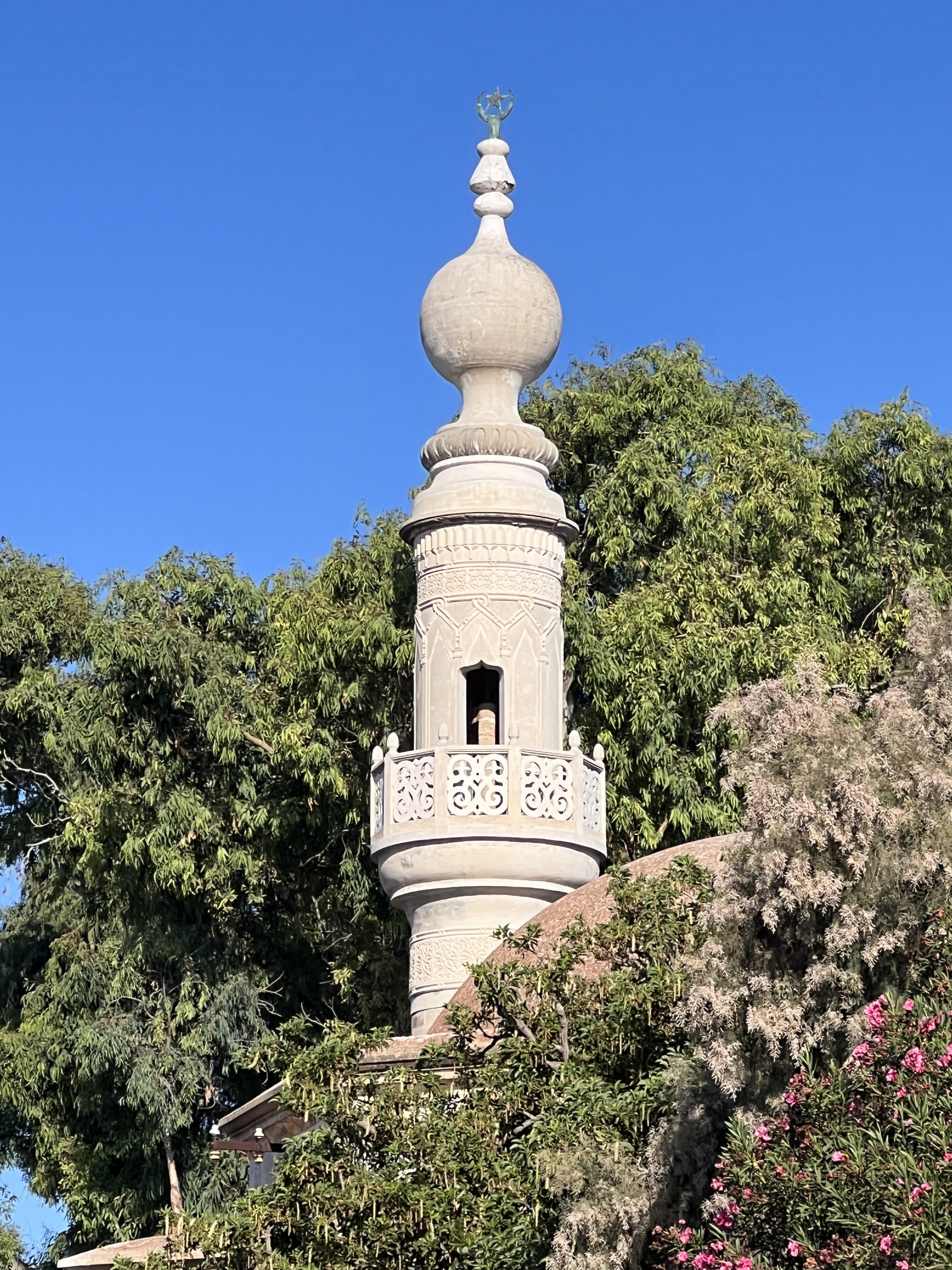
The minaret

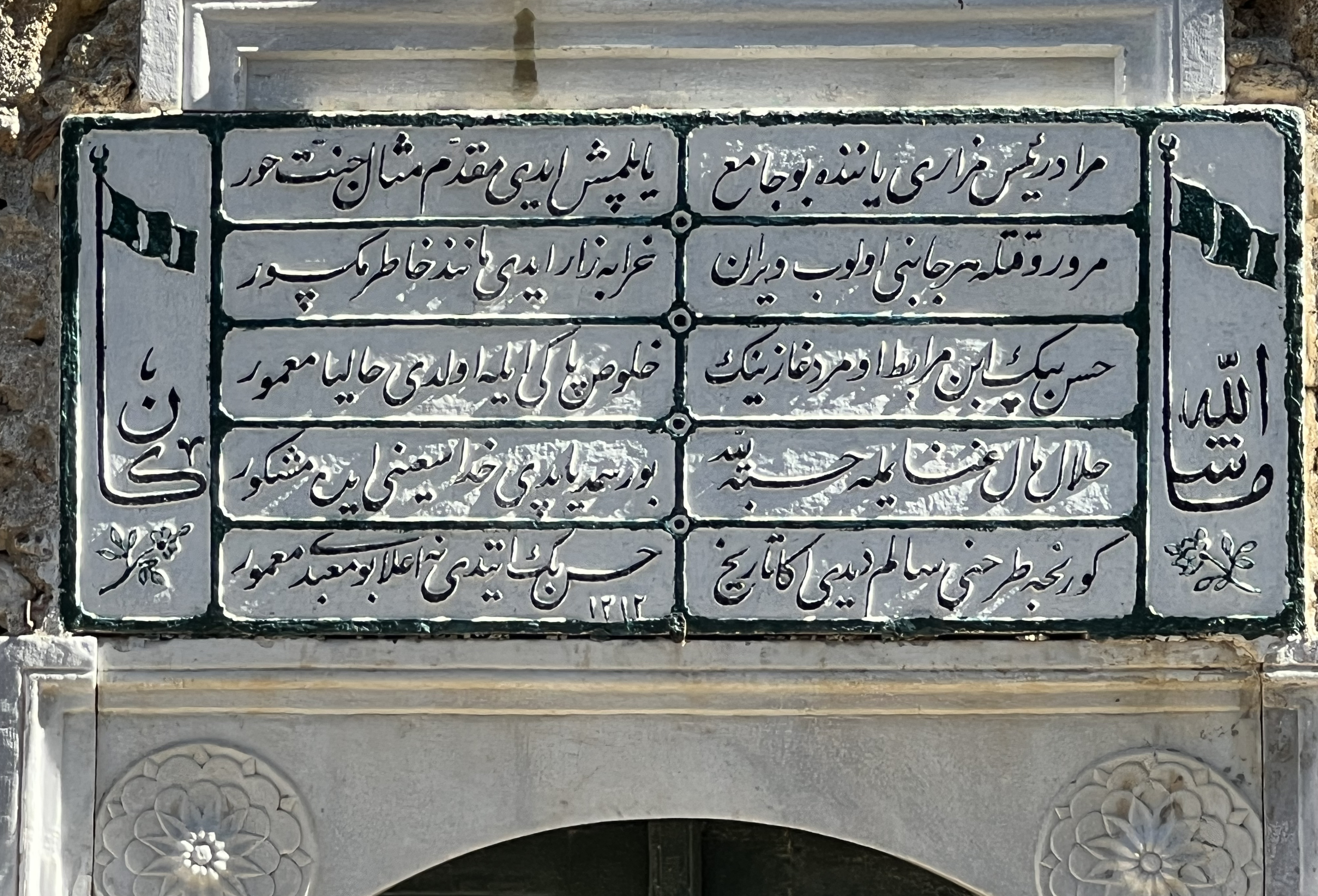
Plaque bearing Ottoman inscription

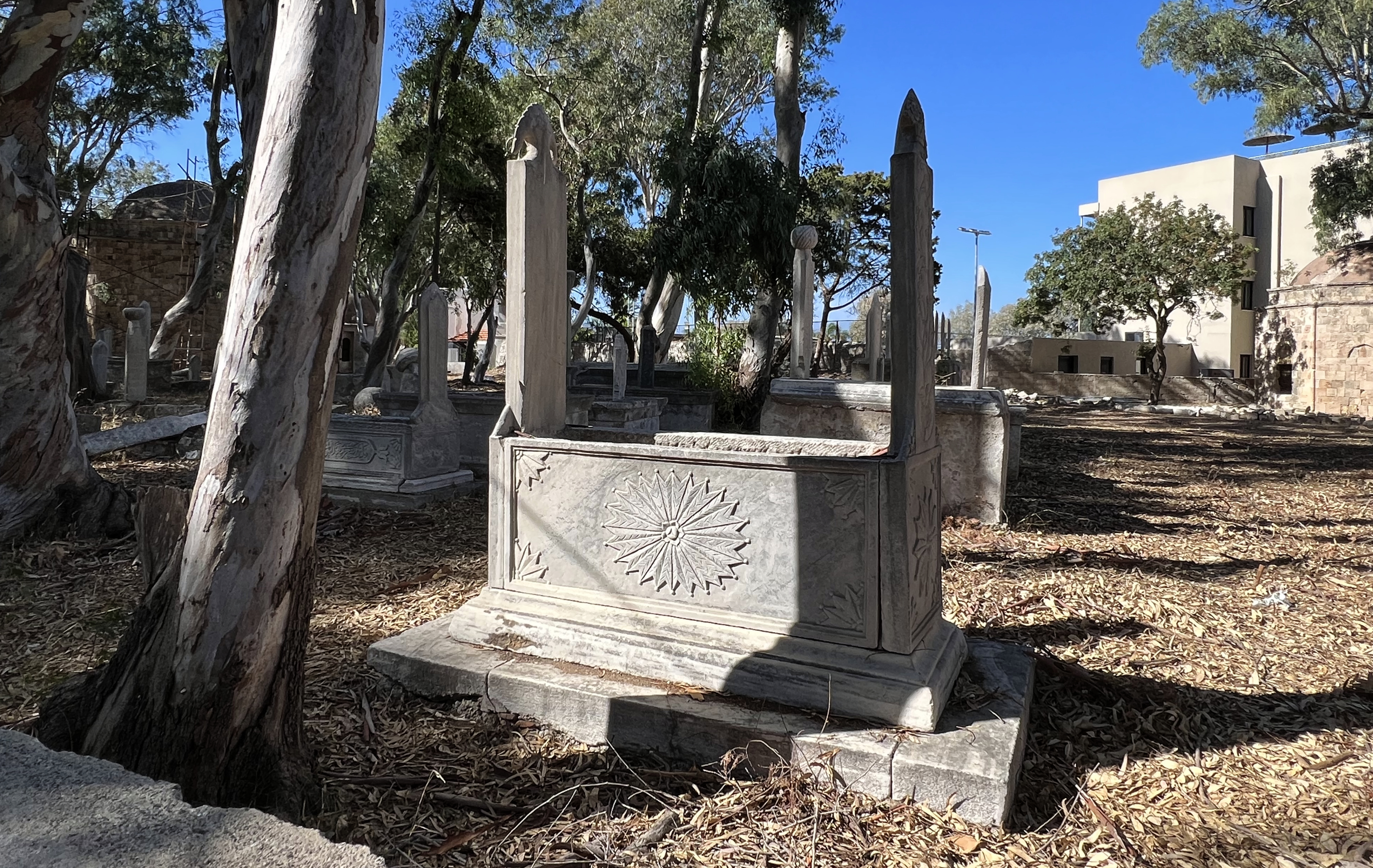
The Ottoman graveyard

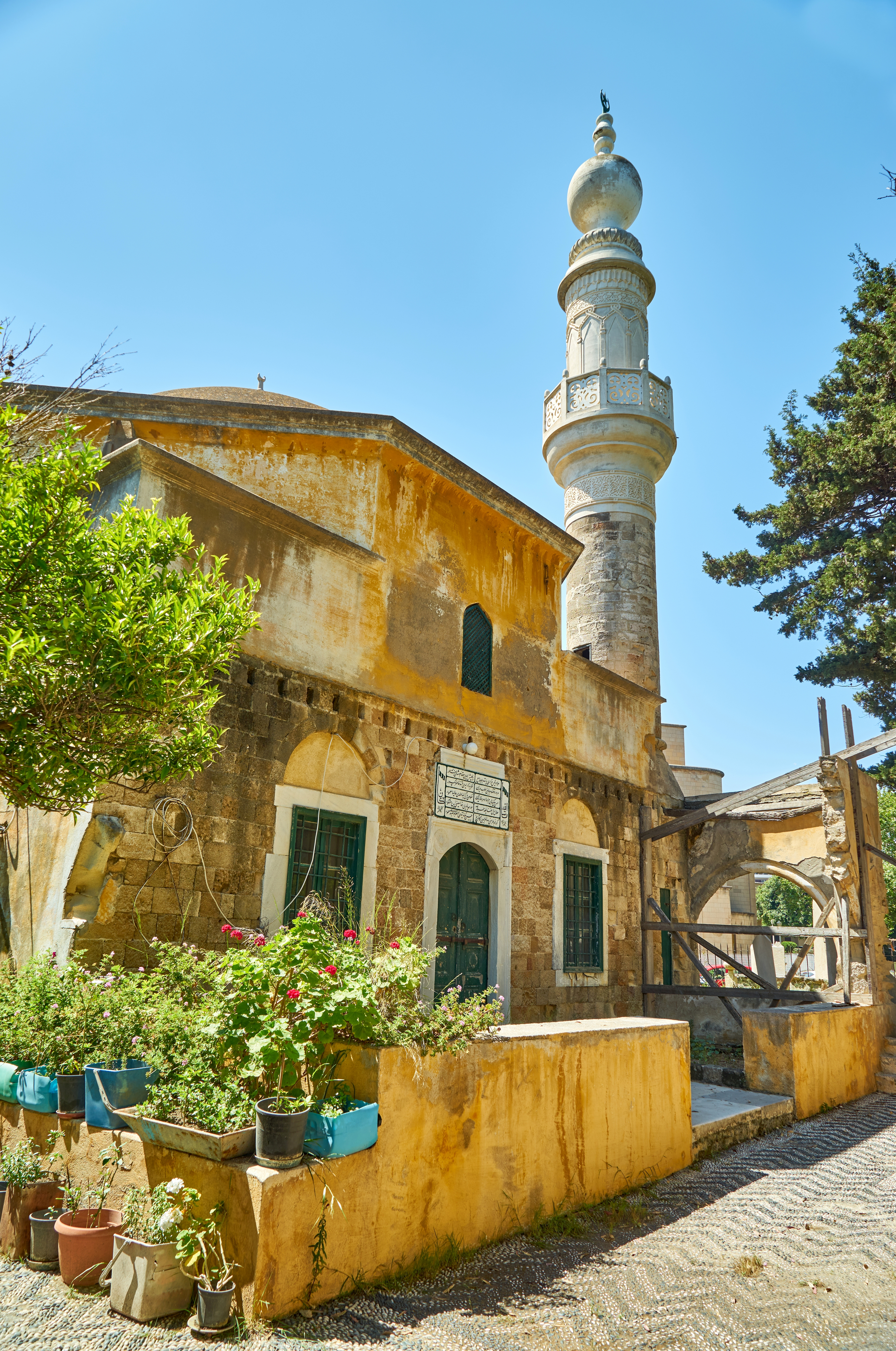
View from the west

== See also ==
- Islam in Greece
- List of former mosques in Greece
- Ottoman Greece

== Bibliography ==
- Economides, Regina (2008). "Murat Reis complex". In Broúskari, Érsi (ed.). Ottoman architecture in Greece. Athens: Ministry of Culture and Sports. ISBN 9789602147931.
- Konuk, Neval (2008). Ottoman architecture in Lesvos, Rhodes, Chios and Kos islands. Ankara: The Center for Strategic Research. ISBN 978-9757307693.
- Panagiotidi, Maria; Kalopisi, Sophia; Mamaloukos, Stavros (2010). Τα οθωμανικά τεμένη στην παλαιά πόλη της Ρόδου: Σουλτάν Σουλεϊμάν τζαμί, Μουράντ Ρέις τζαμί, Σουλτάν Μουσταφά τζαμί, Μεχμέτ Αγά τζαμί [The Ottoman mosques in the old town of Rhodes: Sultan Suleiman mosque, Murad Reis mosque, Sultan Mustafa mosque, Mehmet Agha mosque] (Thesis) (in Greek). pp. 23–25. doi:10.12681/eadd/25418.
