= Øyvind Brandtsegg =

Norwegian musician, programmer and composer

- Born: 16 February 1971 (age 54); Steinkjer, Norway
- Genres: Jazz
- Occupations: Musician, composer
- Instruments: Xylophone, vibraphone, marimba, drums, percussion
- Website: www.ntnu.edu/employees/oyvind.brandtsegg

Øyvind Brandtsegg (born 16 February 1971 in Steinkjer, Norway) is a Norwegian musician (percussion, electronica), programmer and composer, known from a series of recordings, and collaborations with such bands as Motorpsycho and Krøyt.

== Career ==
Brandtsegg studied music at the "Sund folkehøgskole" (Sund Folk High School) in Inderøy Municipality. He studied the vibraphone at the Norwegian University of Science and Technology (NTNU) and created a music software program called ImproSculpt, which samples different tones from the environment (including via body sensors) at the same time the music is performed, processes them and generates ever-changing variations in real time. He plays an instrument called the Marimba Lumina, a MIDI-based marimba which allows the players movements affect the sound.

Brandtsegg led his own rock band as young in Steinkjer, and played with fellow students in the bands Krøyt from 1993, and later the Live Maria Roggen Band. He collaborated with Motorpsycho on commissioned work at the Trondheim Jazz Festival in 2006. Currently Brandtsegg is a professor of music at NTNU.

== Honors ==
- Spellemannprisen 1999 within Krøyt, for the album Low
- Edvard Prize 2000 within Krøyt for the composition "Silent»

== Musical installations ==
- Meta.Morf 1st exhibition 'Installation for a walking bridge' 2012

== Discography ==
=== Under his own name ===
- 2020: Nancarrow Biotope (Crónica Electrónica)

=== Within Krøyt ===
- 1997: Sub (Curling Legs)
- 1998: Low (BP)
- 2001: One Heart Is Too Small (Yonada)
- 2001: Body Electric EP (MNW)

=== Collaborative works ===
With Motorpsycho

- 1994: Timothy's Monster (1994)

With Tre Små Kinesere

- 1996: Tro Håp & Kjærlighet (Columbia Music)
