= Arturas Bumšteinas =

Lithuanian composer and sound artist

Arturas Bumšteinas is Lithuanian composer and sound artist. Active in the field of art music since the end of the 90s, in the year 2012 he started performing under his Refusenik moniker.

== Biography ==
Arturas Bumšteinas (b.1982, Vilnius) is a Lithuanian artist working within the intersections of sound, music and art. His practices could be divided into several categories: experimental music, acoustic sound works, sound installations, pieces for theatre, radio art. In the mid-1990s Bumšteinas was the first Lithuanian artist to use the internet to collect sounds from people around the world and make collage-compositions from these submissions. He is the initiator of various musical projects and since 2000 he has collaborated with different artists like Anton Lukoszevieze, Vladimir Tarasov, Krystian Lupa, Žilvinas Kempinas, Gintautas Trimakas, Lina Lapelytė, Vaiva Grainytė, Laura Garbštienė, Gailė Griciūtė, Piotr Kurek, Ivan Cheng and others. Bumšteinas’s projects were presented in various venues in Europe and his solo exhibitions have been held at Vilnius Contemporary Art Center, Vartai Gallery, AV17, Galerie Antje Wachs and at various residencies around Europe. In 2017 Bumšteinas was an artist-in-residence at the DAAD Berliner Künstlerprogramm and in 2021 he was a resident at Camargo Foundation in France. Notable festivals where his art-music projects were presented include The Holland Festival, Unsound, Tectonics, Sensoralia, Angelica, Vilnius Jazz Festival, Kody, Skanumezs, Cut & Splice, Sacrum Profanum, Ultraschall, Sonic Circuits etc. His music is published by labels such as Crónica Electrónica, Bolt, Unsounds, Edition Telemark and others. In 2013 he was awarded EURORADIO “Palma Ars Acustica” prize for his radio art and a Golden Stage Cross for his theatre work in Jaunimo Teatras in 2021. Since 2021 Arturas plays with his improv group Sneeze Etiquette.

== Selected projects ==
- Antiradical Opera (2002-2005), experimental opera for radio with libretto by Jesse Glass.
- Klavierkonzert. Die Schottische Symphonie by Joseph Beuys (2006), solo piano performance presented in Palais de Wittgenstein and Konzerthaus Berlin on two different occasions, Duesseldorf and Berlin.
- Quartet Twentytwentyone (2005- ongoing), quartet of experimental musicians devoted to performances of graphic scores.
- Stockhausen Cocktail Bar Menu (2007), book of experimental cocktail recipes, produced by Vilnius' Contemporary Art Center.
- Works and Days (2009 - ongoing), international ensemble of improvising musicians.
- My Own Private Bayreuth (2010), relational recording sessions in the gallery space based on Richard Wagner's music, produced by HotelMariaKapel art center, Amsterdam.
- Organ Safari (2010), an ongoing organ-field-recording and live music project produced by Orgelpark, presented by Holland Festival, Amsterdam.
- Words and Music (2010) solo exhibition of interdisciplinary artworks, presented by Galerie Antje Wachs, Berlin.
- Morning and Evening at the Museum (2010), recording and performance project with old instruments from the archives of Lithuanian Theater, Music and Cinema Museum in Vilnius.
- Voicescapes (2011), collaborative project with saxophonist Liudas Mockūnas based on the Mikalojus Konstantinas Čiurlionis's choir music, produced by Semplice Records, presented by the Vilnius Jazz Festival.
- Sleep. An Attempt at Trying (2011), fictional radio programme for insomniacs, produced by Deutschlandradio Kultur.
- Gwizdały (2012), site-specific sound installation and acousmatic concert, produced by Laboratorium CSW and IBPP, Warsaw.
- Scattered Pages (2012), site-specific performance piece for 6 pianos, voices and electronics, based on the music of Anton Bruckner, commissioned by OK Offenes Kulturhaus, Linz.
- Epiloghi - Six Ways of Saying Zangtumbtumb (2013), six epilogues of an imaginary Baroque opera for harpsichord and theater noise machines, composed in response of Luigi Russolo's "The Art of Noises" and René Descartes "Passions of the Soul", produced by Deutschlandradio Kultur.

== Notable collaborators ==
Anton Lukoszevieze (UK), Liudas Mockūnas (LT), Peter "Pure" Votava (AT), Piotr Kurek (PL), Bartek Kalinka (PL), Ilia Belorukov (RU), Denitsa Mineva (DE), Jesse Glass (JP), Dominykas Vyšniauskas (LT), Alina Orlova (LT), Kyrre Bjørkås (NO), Darius Čiuta (LT), Antanas Kučinskas (LT), Antanas Dombrovskij (LT), Lys (LT), Lina Lapelytė (UK), Vladimir Tarasov (LT), Laura Garbštienė (LT), Gintaras Makarevičius (LT), Janel & Anthony (USA), Jeff Surak (USA), Seth Josel (DE), Max Reinhardt (UK), Rhodri Davies (UK), Borut Savski (SI), Wojtek Ziemilski (PL), Tadas Žukauskas (LT), Mikas Žukauskas (LT), Mieczyslaw Litwinski (PL), Maarten Ornstein (NL), Christian Frossi (IT), Chordos Quartet (LT), Johnny Chang (DE), Emanuele Torquati (IT), Gośka Isphording (NL).

== Discography ==
- Floating Points (2002) Virpesys CDR
- Retorta (2003) Nexsound MP3
- Placido (2004) Zeromoon MP3
- Johnny, One Note Drone and Polydrone Tone (2004) Cohort CDR
- Live at Rixc (2005) Organic Pipeline CDR
- Treatise (with Twentytwentyone) (2006) Con-c MP3
- Uniforms (2007) Bolt CD
- Blur (2008) Galerie Antje Wachs CDR
- Heap of Language (2009) Bolt CD
- Pastoral (2010) Crónica MP3
- Stories from the Organ Safari (2010) NMKC CD
- Reading Newspapers (2011) XVParowek MC
- Chip Off The Old Block (2011) ~taquet CDR
- Shadow of Shadows (2011) Crónica MP3
- Eterniday News Nr.1 (2011) Audiotalaia MP3
- My Own Private Bayreuth (2011) Hotel Mariakapel CD
- Place Muzik (with Zarasai) (2011) Sangoplasmo MC
- Voicescapes (with Liudas Mockunas) (2012) Semplice CD
- Three Sixteens (2012) Con-v CD
- Caves (2012) Glissando Magazine MP3
- To Ostatnia Niedziela (2012) Echomusic MP3
- Music of Kaspar Hauser (with Bartek Kalinka) (2012) XVParowek CDR
- September Improvisations (with Wolumen) (2012) DDR MC
- My Live Evil (with Alexander Platzner & Miro Toth) (2012) NomadSkyDiaries MC
- Jakov & Gwizdaly (2012) Crónica MP3
- Live at Balta Nakts (as Refusenik) (2012) Crónica MP3
- Gamelan Descending a Staircase (2015) Crónica CD
