= Battle of Paphos =

Battle of Paphos (1609)
- Part of Ottoman–Habsburg wars
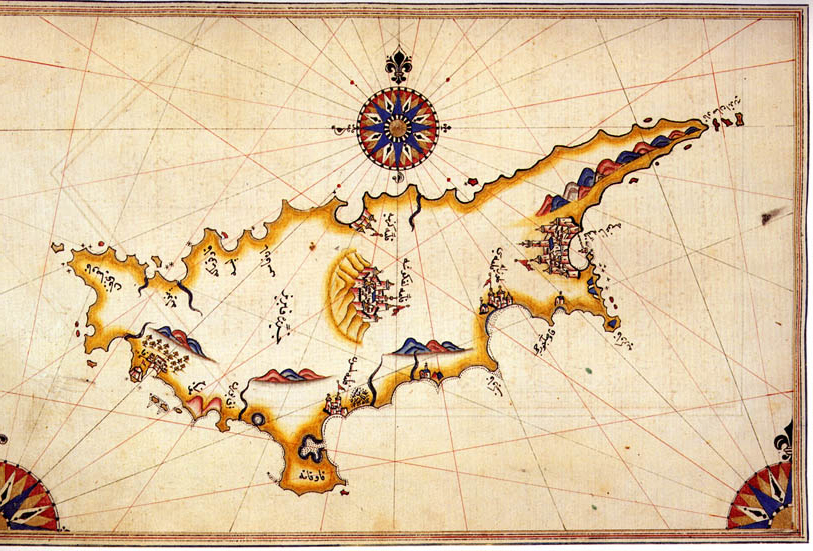
- Cyprus in the 16th-century Kitab-ı Bahriye (Book of Navigation) of Piri Reis, an Ottoman admiral.
Date	July 1609
Location	Paphos, Cyprus
Result	Ottoman victory

Belligerents
(Sovereign Military Order of Malta) Order of Saint John	Ottoman Empire

Commanders and leaders
(Sovereign Military Order of Malta) Jean-Jacques de Fraisinet †	Damat Halil Pasha; Murat Reis the Elder †

Strength
1 galleon 3–9 galleys	50 galleys

Casualties and losses
1 galleon captured 2–5 galleys captured	Heavy

The Battle of Paphos, also known as the Battle of Karacehennem, was a naval engagement fought in the summer of 1609 off the coast of Cyprus, near Paphos. The battle took place between the Ottoman Navy, commanded by Kapudan-ı Derya Halil Pasha, and a squadron of heavily armed Christian corsair galleons. The engagement resulted in a decisive Ottoman victory, highlighted by the capture of an enormous 90-gun galleon known to the Ottomans as Karacehennem (Black Inferno) with around 500 men and 200 rifles.

== Background ==
In the year 1609, several Christian fleets from Malta, Tuscany, or Savoy were cruising in the eastern Mediterranean. The Maltese knights were raiding eastern cities such as Mitylene and Ayaz near Alexandretta and capturing Ottoman ships, achieving successful attacks. News of these attacks reached the Ottoman Kapudan Pasha, Damat Halil Pasha. The Kapudan pasha was not able to chase them because the Grand Vizier had ordered three galleys to fetch the emir Yusuf al-Sayfa, governor of Tripoli in Syria, who had again submitted to the Ottomans after a rebellion. Other ships had been ordered by the Grand Vizier to ferry the troops over the Bosphorus for the year's land campaign. Thus it was only in July 1609 that Halil Pasha was able to sail with 50 galleys.

== Battle ==
The Ottomans sailed to meet the Christian fleet. Near the Cypriot city of Paphos, they met the Maltese. The Maltese flotilla consisted of 4 or 10 ships, commanded by French knight Jean-Jacques de Fraisinet. The Maltese ships consisted of a large galleon called Galeona Rossa. The Ottomans called the ship Kara-djèhennem, meaning Black Inferno. The ship consisted of 80-90 guns. Since the ship was heavily defended, the Ottomans began firing at it for the whole day until they managed to neutralize it. Achieving this, the Ottomans, led by Murat Reis the Elder, began boarding the ship. A fierce battle ensued, during which both sides sustained heavy losses. Both Murad and Fraisinet died during the battle. Nevertheless, the Ottomans successfully managed to capture the ship. Maltese casualties are varied. Out of 4 ships, only one managed to escape. Other sources mention that six ships out of 10 were captured. The victors also captured 160 cannons and 2,000 rifles.

== Aftermath ==
After the battle, Halil Pasha anchored at Famagusta. Here, Murat Reis succumbed to his injuries shortly after the fleet anchored, and subsequently buried in his birthplace of Rhodes. Chasing Tuscan and Maltese corsairs on his way to Istanbul, Halil Pasha arrived the Bosphorus again on the 25th of November, 1609. The fleet fired a massive artillery salute using both Ottoman guns and those taken from the Galeona Rossa. Sultan Ahmed I personally visited the captured ships to inspect the prizes, and Halil Pasha was rewarded with the prestigious rank of Vizier for his decisive triumph. The prizes he captured include 5 galleons, 6 tartanes, 4 galleys, and 540 captives, some of whom were Maltese Knights.

== Sources ==
- Anderson, R. C. (1952). Naval Wars in the Levant 1559–1853. Princeton: Princeton University Press.
- Joseph von Hammer-Purgstall (1835), Histoire de l'Empire ottoman, Vol. VIII (In French).
- Alexander H. De Groot (2010), The Netherlands and Turkey: Four Hundred Years of Political, Economical, Social and Cultural Relations.
- Joseph-Marie Jouannin (1843), Turquie (in French).
