= Lia (artist) =

Austrian software artist

Lia is an Austrian software artist. Born in Graz, she is now based in Vienna. Her work includes the early Net Art sites re-move.org and turux.at. In 2003 she co-curated the Abstraction Now exhibition (Internet Projects and Medialounge) at the Künstlerhaus Wien in Vienna, Austria. In 2003 Lia received an Award of Distinction in the Net Vision/Net Excellence Category for re-move.org.

In the 1990s and early 2000s, she and her collaborator at Turux employed software normally used for multimedia CD-ROMs and Web page enhancements, notably Macromedia Director, to create animated abstract images, which "demonstrates the raw visual horsepower of these tools when they're not yoked to some mundane purpose." Her early work has been highlighted in histories of computer and digital art, particularly for its use of novel forms of interactivity.

Lia subsequently developed and released interactive generative art pieces as iOS apps, and has discussed the ways in which her construction of digital art has evolved with changes in screen resolution. She has extensively used the programming language Processing, which is designed for visual design and software art.

Within Lia's works "Filament Sculptures" (2014) is a series of 3d printed objects exploring 3d printing processes beyond the creation of simple 3d models. Lia investigates how it is possible to play with the amount of filament extruded, speed and the position of the printhead and how these parameters affect the final result. She created a processing application that allowed her to manipulate the parameters above and to create different types of filament sculptures.

She is one of the founding members of Crónica, a "Media-Label" publishing and distribution project for electronic art and cultural artifacts.

== Selected awards ==
- Outstanding Artist Award, Video- and Media-Art, Vienna, Austria, 2017
- Share Prize, Honorable mention, Turin, Italy, 2015
- Digital Graffiti Curator's Choice Winner, Alys Beach, Florida, US, 2014
- 9th Int. Animated Film Festival Tindirindis, Honorable mention, Vilnius, Lithuania, 2011
- Live 2011 Grand Prix, Artistic Game, 2nd Prize, Turku, Finland, 2011
- State Grant for Video- and Media-Art, Austria, 2008
- Prix Ars Electronica, Honorable Mention Audio-Visual Performances, Linz, Austria, 2007
- Diagonale Film Festival, Innovative Cinema, First Prize, Graz, Austria, 2006
- Portuguese Multimedia Awards, Número Festival, Honorable Mention, Portugal, 2005
- Prix Ars Electronica, Net Excellence / Award of Distinction, Linz, Austria, 2003
- (6th) Media Arts Festival, Nomination, Tokyo, Japan, 2003
- Josef Binder Award, First Prize, Austria, 2000
- Josef Binder Award, First Prize, Austria, 1998
