= Shōtetsu =

Japanese poet (1381–1459)

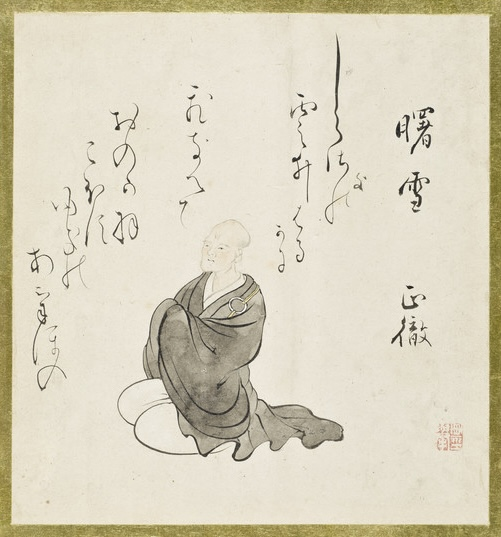
- Painting of Shotetsu by Sakai Hoitsu, early 19th century
- Born: 1381; Bitchū province, Japan
- Died: 1459 (aged 77–78); Kyoto, Japan

Shōtetsu (正徹, 1381–1459 CE) was a Japanese poet during the Muromachi period. He is considered to have been the last poet in the courtly waka tradition and a number of his disciples were important in the development of the renga art form, which led to the haiku.

== History ==
He was born in 1381 in a minor fortified town in the then province of Bitchū (now Okayama) to a samurai of middling rank named Komatsu Ysukiyo. About ten years after his birth, Shōtetsu's family moved to Kyoto for unknown reasons. At approximately the age of 15 (by the Occidental count), he was sent to the religious center of Nara where he became an acolyte in an unspecified Buddhist temple. He would spend the next five years there studying, among other things, Buddhist scripture.

Shortly after his father's death in 1400 CE, Shōtetsu moved back to Kyoto, and sought out a fellow named Imagawa Ryōshun (b. 1325/1326 ?, d. 1417/1420) and asked him to instruct him in the "Way of Poetry".

This was not an unexpected visit for Ryōshun; he and Shōtetsu had met many times previously. It was this Imagawa Ryōshun, retired military leader, lay priest, respected amateur poet, and accomplished author of polemic essays attacking the enemies of the Reizei poetic clan, who was apparently instrumental (the relevant passage gives an incorrect age for Ryōshun at the period it supposedly occurred, leading Inada Toshinori to believe that the passage conflates a number of events; thus it may be misleading as to the circumstances that introduced Shōtetsu to courtly poetry), in introducing the young Shōtetsu (whose personal name then still was Sonmyōmaru, given name Masakiyo) to poetic composition. From an autobiographic portion of Shōtetsu's extended essay on poetry, Shōtetsu Monogatari:

A certain preceptor of the Ontoku'in once said to me, "If you want to compose poetry, I will take you with me to the civil administrator's house across the way." At that period of my life, I was still wearing my hair long in the manner of young children, and I felt embarrassed by my extreme youth, but nonetheless I went with the preceptor to the civil administrator's house. ... Then, when I arrived at the poetry meeting itself on the 25th, the highest places on the one side were occupied by Reizei no Tamemasa and Tamekuni, and on the other side by the former shogunal deputy ... [who] was at that time a lay priest of more than 80 years ... After this occasion, I just kept going again and again to those meetings, and thus gained experience in poetic composition. I was fourteen years old at the time.

Shōtetsu studied classical courtly poetry with Ryōshun, and other areas of literature, including of course famous works like The Tales of Ise, Essays in Idleness, and was even inducted into the secret traditions relating to the famed Tale of Genji and the Shin Kokin Wakashū. With such an influential master, Shōtetsu met and learned from many of the most influential poets of the age. In 1406, Shōtetsu left his master, entering a Kyoto Rinzai Zen temple called Tōfuku-ji; no doubt he was admitted in no little part because of his relationship to Ryōshun (now in his nineties), who had previously gone to that temple. It was during this period that the Reizei family and its poetic ideals (along with associated poets) flourished and received high titles and numerous grants of land. As he was solidly in this school of poetry, Shōtetsu prospered as well.

Eventually, cut loose by his two mentors' deaths (Tamemasa would die in 1417, and Ryōshun in either 1417, or 1420), Shōtetsu embarked on a short journey - one of the very few journeys far away from Kyoto in his life – to visit various "utamakura" (places famously commemorated in poetry); upon his return to Kyoto, he plunged whole-heartedly into Kyoto's poetry scene, having decided to make his life's work poetry, and not Buddhism.

By 1424, he had left his temple for a modest hut on the outskirts of Kyoto, as befitted a professional poet with the accompanying hosts of disciples, patrons, and invitations to head poetry gatherings at the most noble families' homes (and eventually at the residences of the Ashikaga shōguns themselves).

But this happy era for Shōtetsu could not last forever. It ended between the second and third day of the fourth month of the year 1432:

On the night of the second, I stayed over at the house of the Chief of Central Affairs, and awakened to a report that my hut, "Imakumano", had burned in a fire in the neighborhood in the middle of the night – a report that was to no avail, for the damage was already done, with all of the poems I had composed since my twentieth year, all 27,000 of them, in more than 30 volumes, gone up in smoke, not a single one escaping – and this along with all my books and hand-copied treasures.

This was not an isolated setback for the 51-year-old Shōtetsu. The shōgun Ashikaga Yoshimochi had died in 1428, and his younger brother Ashikaga Yoshinori (b. 1394, d. 1441) had succeeded him. Unlike his deceased brother, Yoshinori, with regard to the poetic dispute between the Reizei and the Asukai, distinctly preferred the Asukai's poetry; in addition, several traditional biographies of Shōtetsu claim that Yoshinori had a personal antipathy toward him, going so far as to place Shōtetsu under house arrest. Shōtetsu would suffer two major blows from this official hostility. First, the income from his hereditary estates was confiscated. This was a major financial blow to him, but by no means fatal.

The second blow struck straight at his heart; he was denied inclusion in the 21st, and last ever, Imperial anthology of waka which was compiled and edited by the Asukai. This exclusion from the Shinshokukokin Wakashū ("New Collection of Ancient and Modern Times Continued") meant that Shōtetsu could never achieve the final pinnacle of recognition for poetic merit, and that his name would be permanently diminished for all time; it is difficult to overstate how important inclusion in an Imperial anthology was to medieval poets.

In the wake of this blow, Shōtetsu became a hermit, seeing few people, going to fewer gatherings, and composing even fewer poems. His retreat ended in 1441 with the assassination of Yoshinori by one of his generals; Yoshinori's partisan spirit had extended beyond the field of poetry, and irritated many. Shōtetsu returned to his former place, now a highly respected and experienced poet in the liberal Rezei tradition. These were good and prosperous times for him, as he had entry into the most exclusive homes, and indeed, would even tutor the new shōgun, Ashikaga Yoshimasa (b. 1435, d. 1490), in the intricacies of the Tale of Genji; his reward for this lengthy tutoring would be the return of his familial estate.

From this period on, Shōtetsu's health declined. The shadow of the approaching Ōnin War was even then visible in the riots and disturbances which began occurring a number of years before. Shōtetsu had by this point also outlived many of his patrons, students, teachers and friends. After three years of prolonged illness, Shōtetsu died at the age of 79 in the year 1459. He had begun copying out the Tale of Genji, expecting to complete it before he died. He finished the first chapter. In his later years, his greatest student was Shinkei (1406-1475), who, while he greatly admired his former teacher and Teika, worked not just in waka, but in renga as well, where he was known for his usage of the yugen and yōembi (ethereal beauty) styles.

=== Historical context ===
In poetry there are no teachers. One makes antiquity one's teacher. Provided he steeps his mind in the styles of antiquity and learns his diction from the great poets of old, who can fail to compose good poetry?

— Fujiwara no Teika

A defining feature of the poetry of Japan at this period was the existence of a long running feud or war between a number of clans over primacy in poetry, and consequently in courtly influence. Each clan came to be associated with a distinct artistic school. The Rezei family, which Shōtetsu was aligned with, distinctly hewed to a liberal bent and encouraged its poets to experiment with all ten of the traditional recognized styles of poetry, whereas the rival Nijō family advocated a restrained, conservative style (specifically, the "ushin", or deep feelings style).

Both of these families were descended from Fujiwara no Teika, and both claimed to carry on his legacy.

After a period of Reizei ascendancy under Rezei Tamehide (great-grandson of Teika) (b. 1302 ?, d. 1372), the Reizei suffered a decline and witnessed the rise in the fortunes of the Nijō, as Tamehide's son, Iametuni, became a monk. The Nijō soon suffered setbacks under the wastrel Nijō Tameshige (b. 1325, d. 1385), whose promising son, Nijō Tametō (b. 1341, d. 1381), was killed at a comparatively young age by a brigand.

In a further disaster for the Nijō, Tametō's son, Nijō Tamemigi, was killed by a brigand as well in 1399 (?), effectively wiping out the Nijō as a force. Under the grandson of Tamehide, Tanemasa (b. 1361, d. 1417), the Reizei were raised again to their former position of dominance, and this is when Shōtetsu came into the picture.

He did this with the aid of a former general, Imagawa Ryōshun (b. 1326, d. 1417 or 1420), who had considerable literary skill. They defeated the Nijō adherents close to the Ashikaga shogunate with six polemical treatises between 1403 and 1412, defending the Reizei's poetic doctrine and their cause. Ryōshun used a number of quotations to bolster his case, including notably a quote of Teika, which was that all of the "ten styles" were licit for poetic use and experimentation, and not merely the Nijō's ushin. With the aid Ryōshun afforded him, Tanemasa's politicking eventually succeeded in converting the shōgun, ending the matter – until the Asukai revived the dispute, that is.

== His poetry ==
Shōtetsu was a prolific poet. Steven D. Carter once remarked that "His complete oeuvre, if it existed today, would probably comprise over 31,000 poems." He emulated his idol Fujiwara no Teika in striving to master all accepted style of poetry. His corpus is extremely difficult to critically examine due to the issues of incompleteness, a wide range of voices and style, and sheer size.

=== Examples ===
An example of one of his yūgen ("mystery and depth") poems (translation and format, Steven D. Carter), with the assigned topic preceding Shōtetsu's response:

An Animal, in Spring
The gloom of dusk.
An ox
from out
in the fields
comes walking my way;
and along
the hazy road
I encounter
no one.

Shōtetsu was also adept at courtly love poems:

The Unbearable Wait for Love
Past and
gone now
is the time I awaited,
leaving me
clinging-
anxious for wind
from the pines,
like dewdrops
at break of day.

An allusive variation on a poem by Teika:

Forgotten love
I had forgotten-
as I kept on forgetting
to remind
myself
that those who vow to forget
are the ones who can't forget.

An allusive variation on an anonymous Kokin Wakashū poem:

Tachibana no
Sakeru nokiba no
Kokegoromo
Furuki itama ni
Sode no ka zo suru.

Translation:

Overgrown with moss,
The eaves brighten with the blossoms
Of the orange trees-
Through the old boards to my mossy robe
Comes the scent of sleeves of long ago.

A number of his poems allude to his understanding of Zen Buddhism:

Seeking Love
With what harshness
they come blowing
towards me-
the mountain winds
from deep
within
the heart
of one who asks
no lodging.

Buddhism, related to the Moon
"Look up!"
someone says,
pointing into
empty sky
with one finger-
but no one
bothers to obey
and get
A look
at the moon.

Buddhism
Even
the mountains
all take
for themselves
the form
of
the first Buddha;
and how ceaselessly
the law
is expounded
by the storm winds!

As befitted a professional poet, a number of poems reflect on his chosen occupation:

Famous Market Town
They accumulate,
but there
is no one
to buy them-
these leaves
of words
piling up
like wares
for sale
beneath the Sumiyoshi Pine.

Lamenting
Darkness has fallen.
With my boat
making no progress
on Waka Bay,
I end this year
As others,
tossed on
the waves
of old age.

Reminiscing
So far
to go yet
on the long Way of Poetry-
when the daylight
ends.
How I wish
I had
the body
I had
back when I began!

But of course, most poems are not so easily categorized:

Summer Writing Brush
When I
look upon
the rich sheen
of summer hairs
in my new writing brush,
I am saddened
by a deer-
drawn
at night
to a hunter's torch.

One Call from a Cuckoo
As if to say-
"Isn't it true
for men, as well:
that the more the words,
the less they are of value?"-
the cuckoo does not call again.

Reminiscing
All these images
from
A world
of long ago-
of what good are they?
Pine winds, come-
please blow away
these
unforgotten dreams.

=== Teika ===
Critical to understanding Shotetsu's poetry is appreciation of his connection with Fujiwara no Teika.

In this art of poetry, those who speak ill of Teika should be denied the protection of the gods and Buddhas and condemned to the punishments of hell. Both factions (Nijō vs. Rezei) are tiresome. I myself have no respect for those degenerate houses. I study only the essence of Shunzei and Fujiwara no Teika.

==== Monogatari ====
Most modern understanding of Shōtetsu is derived from his Monogatari, which is by either Shōtetsu himself, or edited by his disciple Shōkō. The work is useful, not merely for the critical discussion, but also for the biographical detail on Shōtetsu that it provides. It exists in 2 volumes, probably compiled by disciples. It contains 'randomly a variety of information: bits of Shotetsu's poetic biography, an articulation of his aesthetic ideals, exegeses of poems, poetic anecdotes, advice for novice poets, and such specialist information as the date of Hitomaro's death.'.

It also provides striking objective proof of Shōtetsu's veneration for Fujiwara. The only poet whose poems are discussed more than Teika is Shōtetsu himself. For all that Shōtetsu was seen by others as a staunch Rezei apologist, and for all that Shōtetsu benefited from his affiliation with the Reizei, he was a bit of a poetic fundamentalist:

Each of these schools has succeeded in mastering only a single poetic style and is constantly disputing with its rivals. It is my opinion that a person should pay no attention whatsoever to these schools. Instead, he ought to cherish the style and spirit of Teika, and strive to emulate him though he may never succeed.

Now, a person might object to this kind of expression, saying that he would write instead, "Can it be that he has prayed / never to see me again?" and protesting that there is no point in putting it into such difficult language. This may be very true, of course, but let such critics look at the collected poems of Teika. There is not a single flat verse to be found among them.

== Partial list of works ==
- Shōkonshū ("Grass Roots") was Shōtetsu's personal anthology of poetry from when he was 52 (the year his Imakumano quarters, and his 32 volumes of 27,00 poems were destroyed by fire), to his death, consisting of ~11,000 poems; this collection was revised after his death by his disciple Shōkō (b. 1412, d. 1494 CE).
- Shōtetsu Monogatari; a work of admixed autobiography and poetic criticism. It is a source of information on Shōtetsu but apparently compiled by his disciples after his death.

== Bibliography ==
- Brower, Robert H. (1992), Conversations with Shōtetsu, Center for Japanese Studies, The University of Michigan, ISBN 0-939512-43-2
- Carter, Steven D. Unforgotten Dreams: Poems by the Zen Monk Shōtetsu. (1997). New York: Columbia University Press. ISBN 0-231-10576-2.
- Miner, Earl. An Introduction to Japanese Court Poetry. (1968). Stanford: Stanford University Press. ISBN 0-8047-0636-0.
- Keene, Donald (1999), Seeds in the Heart: Japanese Literature from Earliest Times to the Late Sixteenth Century (PDF), Columbia University Press, ISBN 0-231-11441-9
- Tsubaki 1971, "Zeami and the Transition of the Concept of Yugen: A Note on Japanese Aesthetics"
- Carter 1978, "Three Poets at Yuyama: Sogi and Yuyama Sangin Hyakuin, 1491"
- Carter 1981, "Waka in the Age of Renga"
- Chance 1989, "Shikishima no michi Recoconsidered: Shotetsu and the Way of Poetry"
- Cranston 1995, "Review: Waka Wars: Quarrels in an Inner Space"
- Carter 1999, "The Persistence of the Personal in Late Medieval Uta"
- Shino 2005, "Voices of a Violent Age: A Contextual Reading of Shotetsu's Poetry in Shotetsu Monogatari
- Sakai Shigeyuki 2007, "The Warrior World of Poetry during the Bunnan and Hotoku Eras: Shotetsu and the Noto Shugo Hatakeyama Yoshitada"
- Shino 2012, "Exploring Nagusamegusa (1418): The semiotics of encounter and exchange for a poet-traveller in Muromachi Japan"
- Suan 2012, "The Male Lady on the Edge of Tears: Yugen, Non-Duality, and Cross-Gendering in Noh"
- "Retrospection and anticipation: an analysis of Shotetsu yugen", Shino 2014
- Carter 2016, "Readings from the Bamboo Grove: A Translation of Sōgi’s Oi no Susami (Part 1)"
