= Sack of Lanzarote (1586) =

Attack on Canary Islands 1586

- Part of Ottoman–Habsburg wars
Date	Late July – 26 August 1586
Location	Lanzarote, Spain
Result	Algerian victory

Belligerents
(Spain) Spanish Empire	Regency of Algiers

Commanders and leaders
(Spain) Don Agustin de Herrera y Rojas (POW) (Spain) Diego de Cabrera Leme †	Murat Reis the Elder

Strength
Unknown	6–7 ships 1,200 men: 400 Turks

Casualties and losses
200–300 enslaved	Unknown

The Sack of Lanzarote occurred in 1586, when 6 or 7 Algerian Galleys, sacked the Spanish island of Lanzarote in the Canary Islands. The Algerians were successful and occupied the island for a month before leaving it.

== Background ==
In 1582, the Ottoman-Algerian Admiral, Murat Reis the Elder, sailed to the Strait of Gibraltar. In late June 1586, after stopping at the Moroccan city of Salé, he executed another sudden landing in Lanzarote with 6 or 7 galleys, 1,200 men, including 400 Turks. The Algerians poured onto the island like a torrent, furiously attacking the castle of Guanapaya, which is the stronghold of the town of Teguise. After assaulting it twice, they managed to destroy it after the death of the commander Diego de Cabrera Leme in its defense.

Thus freed from that obstacle, they burned more than ten thousand fanegas of wheat and barley; and set fire to all the archives and offices of notaries, without saving any ancient document or useful manuscript from the flames. The governor Don Agustin de Herrera y Rojas, the first Marquis of Lanzarote, was captured along his wife Doña Inés Benitez de las Cuevas and Doña Constanza de Herrera, his natural daughter.

However, Murat raised a flag of peace before returning, a truce was agreed upon to negotiate the ransom of those two illustrious prisoners, the sum of which amounted to fifteen thousand ducats. And since only five thousand could be presented at once, Don Diego Sarmiento, the natural brother of the marquis, and Marco de San Juan Peraza were delivered as hostages for the remaining ten thousand.

Thus, Murat withdrew from the island on August 26, taking with him 200 or 300 captives.
