= Heimir Björgúlfsson =

Icelandic artist

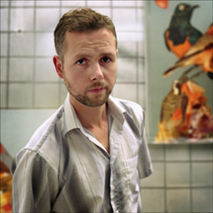
- Born: 1975 (age 50–51); Reykjavík, Iceland
- Education: Sandberg Institute, Gerrit Rietveld Academy, Royal Conservatory
- Known for: Artist, Sculpture, Painting, Drawing, Photography, Collage, Video

Heimir Björgúlfsson is an Icelandic artist born in Reykjavík, Iceland in 1975. Heimir lives and works in Los Angeles, California. He holds a BFA from the Gerrit Rietveld Academy and an MFA from the Sandberg Institute, both in Amsterdam, Netherlands. He also studied Sonology at the Royal Conservatory in The Hague, Netherlands.

== Biography ==
Björgúlfsson was born in Reykjavík, Iceland in 1975 and lived there until 1997 when he moved to The Hague, Netherlands to study Sonology at the Royal Conservatory of The Hague. In 1998 he moved to Amsterdam to study Fine Art at the Gerrit Rietveld Academy where he graduated with a bachelor's degree in 2001. He went on for postgraduate studies at the Sandberg Institute, also in Amsterdam, where he graduated with a master's degree in Fine Art in 2003.

Björgúlfsson has been exhibited in various solo and group exhibitions throughout Europe and the United States, such as The Living Art Museum, Reykjavík (2001 and 2003 solo); Kópavogur Art Museum, Kópavogur, Iceland (2002); Fries Museum, Leeuwarden, Netherlands (2001 and 2004 solo); W139, Amsterdam (2004 solo); Gemeente Museum, The Hague (2006); Reykjavík Art Museum, Reykjavík (2010); The Biennale for International Light Art, Ruhr, Germany (2010); Stenersen Museum, Oslo (2011); and Museum of Fine Arts, Houston (2012).

He was a founding member of the experimental music band Stilluppsteypa from 1992 until he left in 2002. During that time they produced 19 releases and toured both Europe and The United States, as well as appearing on 16 compilation releases. He also has 9 releases out both as solo and in collaboration with Jonas Ohlsson, as well as 13 compilation appearances. After that he was a member of the experimental improvisation band The Vacuum Boys who have 2 releases out to date. He ran the record label FIRE.inc. from 1993 until 2003 and put out 24 releases by artists such as The Hafler Trio, Stilluppsteypa, Akira Yamamichi, Stock Hausen & Walkman, Vindva Mei, irr.app.(ext.), Skúli Sverrisson, Carl Michael von Hausswolff, Sigtryggur Berg Sigmarsson and Reptilicus.

Björgúlfsson has been featured in such publications as Tema Celeste, Artnet, Artweek, the Los Angeles Times, Houston Chronicle, Huffington Post, Temporary Art Review, ArtScene, Coagula Art Journal, ArtsHouston, The Houston Press, Metropolis M, The Wire, The Guardian, The Independent, De Volkskrant, Computer Arts and Morgunbladid.
