= Monty Adkins =

English composer

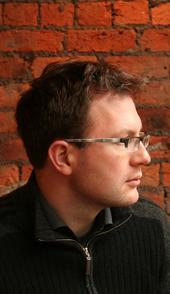
- Born: Mathew Adkins; 29 March 1972 (age 54); Leamington, UK
- Education: Pembroke College, Cambridge; University of Birmingham; University of East Anglia
- Occupations: Composer, performer, lecturer
- Known for: Electroacoustic music
- Notable work: Melt, Clothed in the Soft Horizon, Neurotransmission, Still Time, Four Shibusa
- Awards: Stockholm Electronic Arts Award, Résidence Prize (Bourges), Grand Prix of Musica Nova

Monty Adkins (aka Mathew Adkins, born 29 March 1972) is a composer, performer and lecturer in electroacoustic music.

== History ==
Adkins was born in Leamington, UK, and is currently living in Huddersfield, UK. He read music at Pembroke College (Cambridge, UK) and then, in 1993, became a member of the BEAST (Birmingham ElectroAcoustic Sound Theatre). He studied electronic music with Jonty Harrison and then Simon Waters, undertaking postgraduate studies at the University of Birmingham, and completing his PhD at the University of East Anglia in 1997. It was at the age of 22 that he first came to international attention with the electroacoustic works Melt and Clothed in the Soft Horizon. Between them these works were awarded the Stockholm Electronic Arts Award (Sweden), the Résidence Prize (Bourges, France) and the Grand Prix of Musica Nova (Prague, Czech Republic). He has since won more than twenty international prizes for his work, which has been performed and broadcast throughout Europe, USA, Canada, Australasia, China, and Asia. He has worked in a number of prestigious European studios, including EMS (Stockholm, Sweden), Ina-GRM and IRCAM (Paris, France), Césare (Reims, France), and Heinrich Strobel Studio (Freiburg, Germany).

In the early 1990s, Adkins concentrated predominantly on acousmatic concert music, electronic works for contemporary dance, multimedia works, and electroacoustic music. What he was particularly drawn to in writing such works is the collaborative process that evolves between the composer and artist/performers. The most notable of these have been Neurotransmission (1998), an hour-long acousmatic dance score written for Wayne McGregor and Random Dance in 1998, Still Time (2001) for the flutist Alejandro Escuer, Symbiont (2002) a multimedia collaboration with Miles Chalcraft, and nights bright daies (2003) for the Ictus piano and percussion quartet; the latter premiered in June 2004 at the Festival Agora No 7 at IRCAM (Paris, France). In recent years he has collaborated extensively with the composer Paulina Sundin and recorder player/composer Terri Hron.

Following a brief period in New Zealand in 2006 his work changed significantly. Becoming more influenced by minimal electronica, oceanic glitch and microscound his work became less overtly gestural, introverted and personal. His work also began to explore extended timeframes. Although split into sections, Five Panels (2008, 46 mins) and fragile.flicker.fragment (2011, 53 mins) and Four Shibusa (2012, 43 mins) are essentially multipart works rather than albums with separate tracks. Four Shibusa, for example, is composed using clarinet sounds, recorded by Jonathan Sage and Heather Roche. His recent works continue this way of thinking and includes Rift Patterns (2014) released as an iBook complete with a short story by Deborah Templeton, photographs by Stephen Harvey, and videos by Jason Payne.

== Albums ==
2002

- "Fragmented Visions" (MPS Music And Video, 2002)
- Mondes inconnus (empreintes DIGITALes, IMED 0679, 2006)
- [60]Project (empreintes DIGITALes, IMED 0898, 2008)
- Five Panels (Signature, Radio France, 2009)
- Fragile.Flicker.Fragment (Audiobulb, 2011)
- Four Shibusa (Audiobulb, 2012)
- Residual Forms (Crónica, 2014)
- Rift Patterns (Audiobulb, 2014)
- Borderlands (Audiobulb, 2015)
- Unfurling Streams (Crónica, 2015)
- Shadows and Reflections (Crónica, 2017)
- Moeror (Crónica, 2018)

== List of mixed works ==
- Lepidoptera (2015), recorders and electronics (co-composed with Terri Hron)
- Rondures (2015), saxophone quartet and electronics (co-composed with Paulina Sundin)
- Splintered Echoes (2014), percussion and electronics (co-composed with Paulina Sundin and Jonny Axelsson)
- Shards (2010), objects and electronics (co-composed with Paulina Sundin)
- between lines (2008), cello and electronics
- Nights Bright Daies (2003), 2 pianos, 2 percussions, and electronics
- Still Time (2001), flute, and electronics
- Noumena (2000), cello and electronics

== List of early acousmatic works ==
- Melt (1994)
- Clothed in the Soft Horizon (1994)
- Mapping (1995–97)
- Pagan Circus (1996–97)
- Neurotransmission (1998)
- Breaking (1999)
- Liquid Neon (1999)
- Deepfield (2000–1)
- Aerial (2002)
- Symbiont (2002)
- Cortex (2004–05)
- Silk to Steel (2005)
- Silent Red (2006), 2 dancers, 3 video projections, and tape

== Remixes ==
- With Hells Note (2014), remix of Tout Croche (The Silent Howl)
- auva (2013), remix of Autistici and Justin Varis "Nine"
- For Kenneth Kirschner (2013), remix of Kirschner's 10 July 2012 with video by Julio d'Escrivan

== Writings ==
Adkins has written extensively on the aesthetics of digital music and published edited books on the music of Roberto Gerhard (Ashgate, 2013). His papers are freely available online.
