= Murat Reis the Elder =

Ottoman admiral (1534–1609)

- Died: 1609
- Military career
- Allegiance: Ottoman Empire
- Branch: Ottoman Navy
- Rank: Admiral
- Conflicts: Battle of Preveza; Ottoman conquest of Cyprus; Battle of the Strait of Hormuz (1553); Sack of Lanzarote (1586); Action of 17 June 1595; Battle of Paphos †

Murat Reis the Elder (Turkish: Koca Murat Reis; Albanian: Murat Reis Plaku fl. 1534 – 1609) was an Ottoman privateer and admiral, who served in the Ottoman Navy. He is regarded as one of the most important Barbary corsairs.

== Early career ==
Born into an Albanian family on Rhodes, he began his career when he joined the crew of Dragut at a very young age. In 1534, Murat Reis accompanied Hayreddin Barbarossa to Constantinople where they were received by Suleiman I, who appointed Hayreddin Barbarossa to take command of the Ottoman fleet. While in Constantinople, Murat Reis participated in the construction of new warships at the naval arsenal on the Golden Horn.

== Battle of Preveza ==
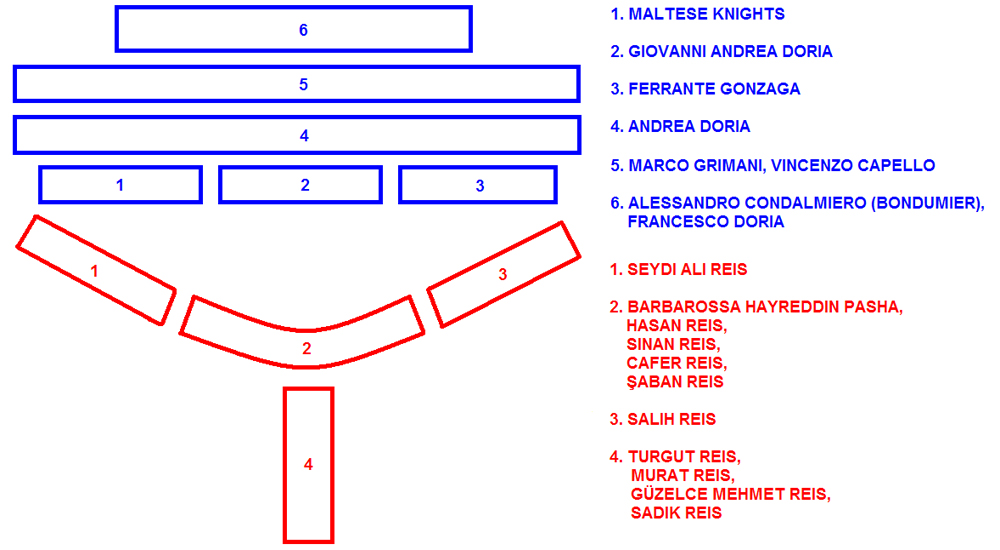
Murat Reis fought in the center-rear wing of Turgut Reis at the naval Battle of Preveza in 1538

Murat Reis took part in all of the early naval campaigns of Turgut Reis. On September 25 and 26, 1538, he was assigned with the task of preventing the ships of the Holy League under the command of Andrea Doria from landing at Preveza, and he successfully repulsed them from the shoreline. On September 28, he took part in the main combat and played an important role in the Ottoman victory at the Battle of Preveza, where he fought along with Turgut Reis in the center-rear wing of the Ottoman fleet which had a Y-shaped battle configuration.

== Indian Ocean ==
He continued to accompany Turgut Reis until being assigned as the Hind kapudanı, or Commander-in-Chief, of the Indian Ocean fleet. Following Piri Reis's retreat from Hormuz into the Persian Gulf, Murat Reis was tasked with bringing the combined Gulf and Red Sea fleets back to Ottoman-controlled Suez. The Portuguese had recently sent a fleet to Hormuz intending to lift Piri Reis' siege. The Portuguese fleet, still in the area, blocked Murat Reis from exiting the Gulf. Within a year he was replaced with Seydi Ali Reis, who would see the entire fleet destroyed and lost attempting to push past the Portuguese sailing ships, which were better-equipped for combat on the open ocean.

== Siege and conquest of Cyprus ==
In 1570, Murat Reis, in command of a fleet of 25 galleys, was assigned with the task of clearing the area between Crete, Rhodes and Cyprus for the build-up of the naval siege and eventual conquest of Cyprus. He was also assigned with the task of blocking the Venetian ships based in Crete from sailing to Cyprus and assisting the Venetian forces in that island. He continued to undertake this task until the eventual surrender of Famagusta, the final Venetian stronghold on the island.

== Canary Islands ==
In 1586 he led the first expedition of the Barbary corsairs in the Atlantic Ocean and raided several of the Canary Islands. The expedition was conducted primarily with galleys rather than sailing ships. Murat Reis captured a prisoner to serve as a guide to the islands, but when the prisoner attempted to lead Murat Reis astray, the captain responded, "even though I've never been there, I'm sure that what you say is impossible." Using recent European cartography that Piri Reis had incorporated into his maps, Murat Reis had his galleys row into the Ocean. By nightfall, they reached the island of Lanzarote and landed 250 soldiers. During their attacks, they captured (among others) the Spanish governor of the island, who was later ransomed and released. Spain had a fleet commanded by Martín de Padilla attempt to intercept the Ottomans at the Strait of Gibraltar, through which they would have to pass to return to Ottoman bases in the Mediterranean, but Murat Reis waited until a fog came, and slipped by under cover of darkness and hidden in the fog banks. Two years later, he conducted a second raid on the Canaries with a fleet of more modern galleons, in conjunction with implicit British support against the Spanish.

== Mediterranean campaigns ==
Murat Reis was later assigned with the task of controlling the lucrative trade routes between Egypt and Anatolia which were often raided by the Venetians, the French and the Maltese Knights.

In 1609, he heard of the presence of a joint French-Maltese fleet of ten galleys, including the famous Galeona Rossa, a large galleon armed with 90 cannons which was known among the Christians as the Red Galleon and among the Ottomans as the Black Hell, under the command of a knight named Fresine, off the island of Cyprus, and sailed there to engage them in the Battle of Paphos. After successfully striking the enemy ships with cannons from both long distance and close range, he severely damaged the Black Hell and captured the ship. Six out of the ten French-Maltese galleys were captured, along with 50 knights aboard the Black Hell, and the total of 160 cannons and 2,000 muskets. During the battle Murat Reis was seriously injured, and died from the wounds sustained.

Per his own wishes, he was buried in Rhodes, in the cemetery of the Murat Reis Mosque, which was named in his honor. This was a pre-existing cemetery used to bury military members and high-ranking officials, with the Mausoleum itself constructed in the octagonal Ottoman style.

== Legacy ==
Several submarines of the Turkish Navy have been named after Murat Reis (see Oruç Reis-class submarine). One of the municipalities that form the City of Algiers, which was once the regional capital of the Ottoman Eyalet of Algeria (1517–1830), is named Bir Mourad Raïs (Murat Reis' well) in his honor.

Under the name 'Morato Arráez', he is mentioned in several literary works of the Spanish Golden Age, for example by Miguel de Cervantes and Lope de Vega.

== See also ==
- Murat Reis the Younger
- Ottoman Navy

== Sources ==
- E. Hamilton Currey, Sea-Wolves of the Mediterranean, London, 1910
- Bono, Salvatore: Corsari nel Mediterraneo (Corsairs in the Mediterranean), Oscar Storia Mondadori. Perugia, 1993.
- Corsari nel Mediterraneo: Condottieri di ventura. Online database in Italian, based on Salvatore Bono's book.
- Bradford, Ernle, The Sultan's Admiral: The life of Barbarossa, London, 1968.
- Wolf, John B., The Barbary Coast: Algeria under the Turks, New York, 1979; ISBN 0-393-01205-0
- The Ottomans: Comprehensive and detailed online chronology of Ottoman history in English.
- Comprehensive and detailed online chronology of Ottoman history (in (in Turkish))
- Turkish Navy official website: Historic heritage of the Turkish Navy (in (in Turkish))
