= Pedro Tudela =

Portuguese artist

Pedro Tudela (born 1962 in Viseu, Portugal) is a Portuguese artist.

As a student, he co-founded the Missionary Group (Grupo Missionário), where he collaborated from 1981 to 1987. In 1992, on the occasion of the exhibition "Mute... life", he founds the collective Multimedia Mute Life Dept. (MLd). Author of and Presenter of the Radio Programmes “Choose a Finger” and “Reduced Atmosphere” on the XFM Radio station, between 1995 and 1996. He co-founded the @c project in 2000 with Miguel Carvalhais. Collaborates with the Group Virose and becomes a member of the Virose – Associação Cultural e Recreativa in 2000. He co-founded of Crónica Media Label. Graduates in Fine Arts [Painting] at ESBAP, Porto, Portugal, 1987. He has regularly exhibited in Portugal and abroad since 1982, and is now a professor at the University of Porto.
