= Simone Jones =

Canadian artist

- Education: Ontario College of Art (OCAD University) York University
- Known for: Kinetic Art; Installation Art
- Website: simonejones-studio.com

Simone Jones is a multidisciplinary Canadian artist known for her kinetic artworks.

== Works ==
Jones' early work focused on kinetic sculptures, graduating from the Ontario College of Art (now OCAD University) with a focus on Experimental Art, and a MFA in Sculpture Installation from York University. Her work expanded to include film, video, and performance. More recent work explores incorporating robotics, digital media and electronics in sculptural and kinetic works.

== Exhibitions ==
In 2014, Jones was included in the Biennale de Montreal. In 2015, her work was included in the exhibition Lively Objects at the Museum of Vancouver.

In 2016, she collaborated with Laura Millard on "Recursive Tracks" with performance work on the theme of ice in a silo interior as part of the In/Future festival with site-based installations on the decommissioned west island of Ontario Place.

== Professional life ==
Between 2000 and 2003, Jones was a visiting professor at Carnegie Mellon University in Pittsburgh, PA. Jones is a faculty member at the OCAD University in 2003. She current teaches in the Integrated Media Program and the Digital Futures Program.

In 2020, Jones received OCAD's Distinguished Research, Scholarship and Creative Activity Award, and she started serving as Chair of the Senate for OCAD's governance body.

== Personal life ==
Jones's life partner is writer Hope Thompson.
