= Gintas K =

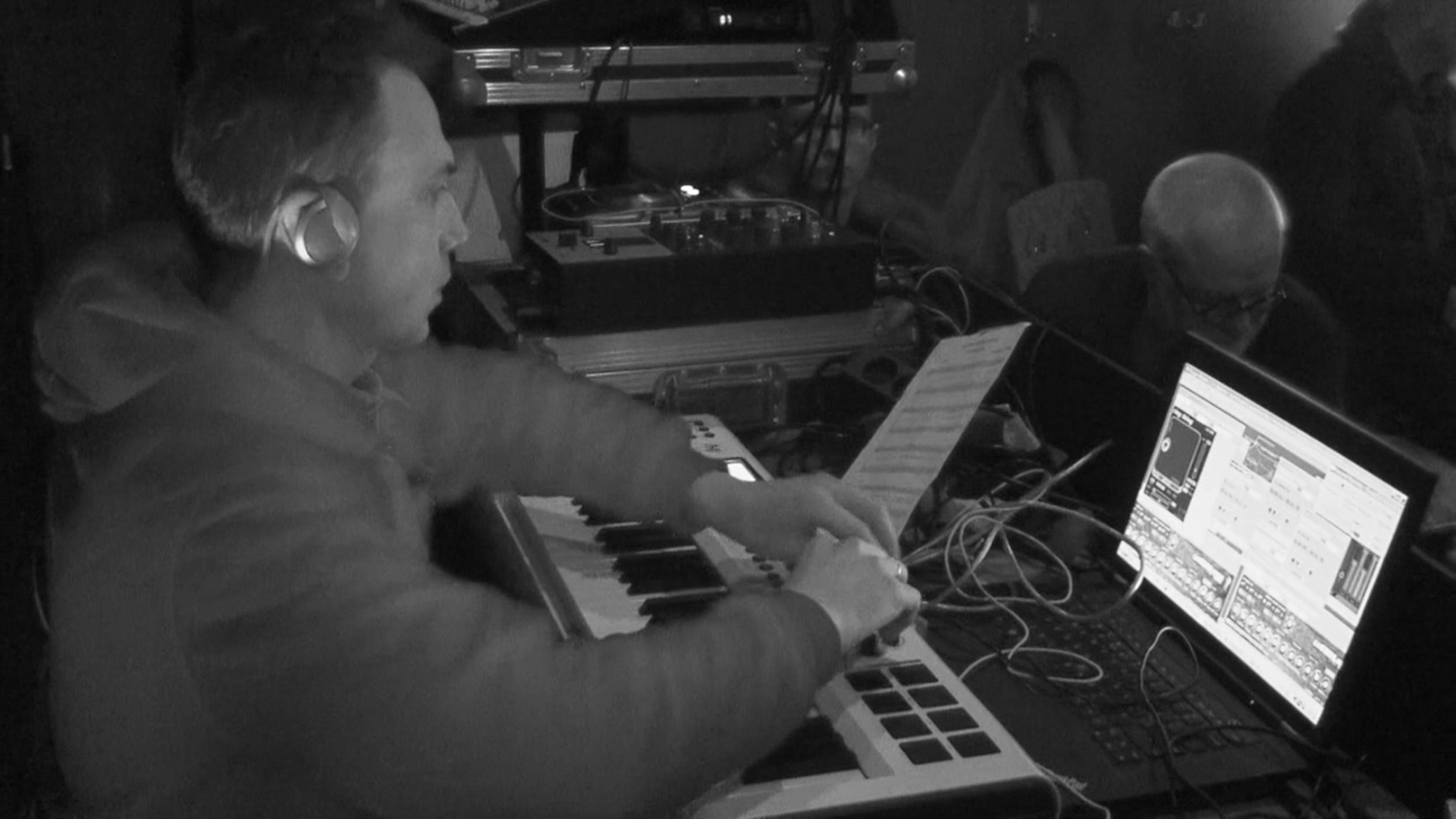
Gintas K

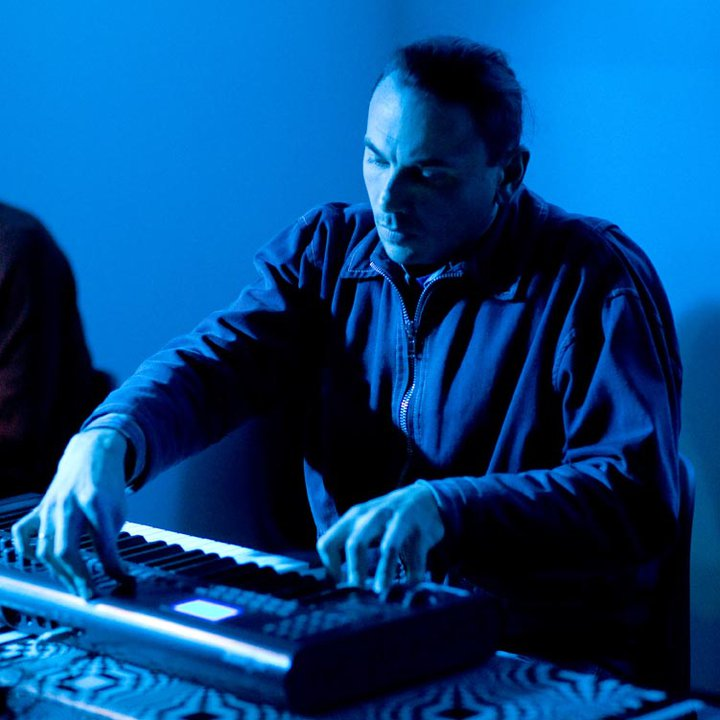
Gintas K

Gintas K (real name Gintas Kraptavicius; born 1969) is a sound artist born in Lithuania in 1969. He was the core member of the first Lithuanian industrial music group "Modus". Performances, actions, even short films shape the activities of "Modus" (which is translated as "the way of life").

Later Gintas Kraptavicius was active as a performer and interdisciplinary artist, known for his actions, happenings, written instructions in a post-fluxus manner.

In 1999 Gintas turned his scenery name into Gintas K and started exploring experimental, electroacoustic, electronic, computer music, granular synthesis, live electronic music aesthetics. Since 2011 member of Lithuanian Composers Union. Till now he has released 51 albums, took part in various international festivals, conferences, symposiums as transmediale.05 : Basics, transmediale.07 : Unfinish!, ISEA 2015: Disruption, IRCAM Forum Workshops 2017, IRCAM Forum Workshops Paris 2025, ICMC2018, ICMC2022, ICMC2025, ICMC2026, ICMC-NYCEMF 2019 , NYCEMF 2020 , Ars Electronica Festival 2020 , Ars Electronica Festival 2023 , NYCEMF 2021 , NYCEMF 2022 , NYCEMF 2023 NYCEMF 2024 , NYCEMF 2025 , Ars Electronica Festival 2024 , FARM’25/SPLASH'25 . Winner of the II International Sound-Art Contest Broadcasting Art 2010, Spain. Winner of The University of South Florida New-Music Consortium 2019 International Call for Scores in electronic composition category.

In 2025, he was awarded the Lithuanian Composers' Union Prize in the Best Musicology Works Competition for his open and playful documentation of the experimental Lithuanian music era in his book "Games, or Fragments of Lithuanian Experimental Music"

== Discography ==
=== Albums ===
- 2003 o)o(o
- 2003 ////
- 2003 without out (live @ garso zona)
- 2004 Taip Taip
- 2004 titled#
- 2006 Jamaika
- 2006 Lengvai / 60 x one-minute audio colours of 2kHz sound
- 2007 13 Tracks
- 2007 Elementary Particles
- 2009 Lovely Banalities
- 2009 Frozen Time
- 2010 So On
- 2011 The live that never have been played live
- 2012 Gintas K
- 2013 ffff (unpublished album 2005)
- 2013 works 2006-2008
- 2013 Slow
- 2013 Greit
- 2013 NOTA DEMO
- 2014 pOpXEnA
- 2014 Blind Man Tales
- 2014 Minerva or Anything Goes
- 2015 i will tell you 3 things / an easy listening album
- 2015 Love Is Love
- 2015 Message in a Bottle
- 2015 jesus safe my soul
- 2016 Lives
- 2016 Low
- 2016 Dimensions
- 2017 Under my Skin
- 2017 2014
- 2018 Acousma Light
- 2019 M
- 2019 One Day Journey
- 2019 Variations in a-moll for a granular synthesis
- 2020 Amnesia
- 2020 Extensions
- 2020 Sound & Spaces
- 2021 The Ways
- 2021 Art Brut
- 2021 Nervus Vagus
- 2022 Lėti
- 2022 Mountains, runlets, caves & cascades
- 2022 Jingles With Bells
- 2023 Resonances
- 2023 Towards Calm Ecstasy
- 2023 Sound & Spaces #2
- 2023 Catacombs & Stalactites
- 2024 broken kontrol
- 2024 Electroacoustic Space Drumming
- 2024 Outsider's
- 2025 Atmosfera
- 2025 Breakcore
- 2025 Intense Beauty
- 2025 The Third Policeman
- 2026 Merzmania
- 2026 exercises
- 2026 PreAtmosfera

=== Collaborations ===
- 2008 Robertas Kundrotas & Gintas K - Septyni Tiltai Pasaulio Centre
- 2009 Gintas K & GYS - when the drummer is smoking
- 2013 GINTAS K/DAVID ELLIS/SIMON TYSZKO
- 2014 Richard Crow & Gintas K - Unburied Evidence
- 2016 Travis Johnson & Gintas K - studies
- 2017 Gintas K & Roomet Jakapi - i will loose it
- 2018 Travis Johnson & Gintas K - Into the Void
- 2020 Portraitzine issue Gintas K
- 2020 Gintas K and KAZUYA ISHIGAMI split
- 2020 Gintas K & Jukka-Pekka Kervinen - Pop Will Generate Itself
- 2021 “Two K” - Jan Kruml's & Gintas Kraptavičius - Environmental Framework
- 2021 Live at Noise=Noise by Richard Crow & Gintas K 2014
- 2022 Sorry Gold by GINTAS K & MICHELLE O'ROURKE
- 2023 Gintas K & Zan Hoffman - Bunny Tales
- 2023 flux remix with Kommissar Hjuler & Mama Baer
- 2023 haunted remix with Kommissar Hjuler & Mama Baer
- 2023 Wren-Variations

=== Visual project ===
- 2000 Less and Less Stars Every Year
- 2005 Gimimo diena
- 2014 August Strindberg. THE CREDITORS

== Sources ==
=== Interviews ===
- Garso menininkas Gintas Kraptavičius: „Lietuvos eksperimentinė muzika pasaulyje nėra jokia provincija“ 2024 05 12
- Garso menininkas Gintas K kūrybinį kelią pristatė autobiografinėje knygoje 2024/04/30
- theQ:: is based on the original Questionnaire of Marcel Proust GINTAS KRAPTAVIČIUS 2022/08/20
- Gintas Kraptavičius: „Mano muzikos misija? OMG – aišku pakeisti pasaulį!“ 2021/05/10
- Interview in Lietuvos muzikos antena March 1h, 2019
- Interview in Lietuvos muzikos antena April 24h, 2018
- Interview in LMIC September 24h, 2015
- Interview in infinite grain, dialogue 03: gintas k June 30th, 2014
- Interview in Chain D.L.K. 2013
- Interview in radikaliai.lt
- Interview in ore.lt
- Interview in delfi.lt
- Interview in bernardinai.lt 2006
- Interview in New Media Art Project Network 2006

=== Reviews ===
- Review in geiger.dk
- Review in PHOSPHOR
- Review in Wreck This Mess
- Review in Monochrom.at
