= Shinkei =

Japanese poet

- 心敬
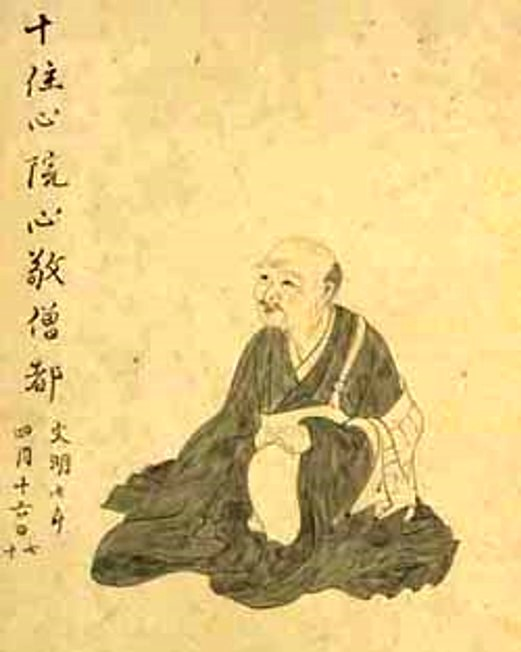
- Shinkei
- Born: 1406; Kii Province (now Wakayama, Wakayama Prefecture), Japan
- Died: April 14, 1475 (aged 68–69); Ōyama, Sagami Province, Japan
- Occupations: poet and priest
- Writing career
- Language: Japanese
- Genres: Tanka and renga poetry

Shinkei (心敬, 1406 – 14 May 1475) was a Japanese Buddhist priest and poet (tanka and renga poetry).

== Life and work ==
Shinkei was born in Taisha, Kii Province (now Wakayama, Wakayama Prefecture) in 1406. He was a Buddhist priest at an early age and quickly rose to the rank of Daisōzu (大僧都, Senior Director).

He regarded poetry as the result of a religious way of life (shugyō). For more than thirty years he remained a student with the poet Shōtetsu. His poems are based on the Japanese aesthetic ideal called yūgen (幽玄). He also wrote the poetic treatises Sasamegoto (ささめごと) in 1463 and Oi no kurigoto (老のくりごと) in 1471.

Shinkei died on 14 May 1475 in Ōyama, Sagami Province (now part of Kanagawa Prefecture).

== Translations in English ==
Esperanza Ramirez-Christensen translated and annotated Shinkei's Sasamegoto under the title Murmured Conversations: A Treatise on Poetry and Buddhism by the Poet-Monk Shinkei (Stanford University Press, 2008), which received the Japan–U.S. Friendship Commission Prize for the Translation of Japanese Literature in 2009. Ramirez-Christensen also published a book-length study on Shinkei's life and poetry titled Heart's Flower: The Life and Poetry of Shinkei (Stanford University Press, 1994).
