= Marla Hlady =

Canadian artist

- Born: 1965 (age 60–61); Edmonton, Alberta, Canada
- Education: University of Victoria, York University
- Known for: sculptor, installation artist, kinetic artist, video artist, new media artist, interactive artist, sound artist
- Notable work: Gut Machines (1994-95); Waltzing Matilda (2000); Playing Piano (2008)
- Website: marlahlady.com

Marla Hlady is a Canadian kinetic and sound artist who works in sculpture, drawing, sound and installation. She is a contemporary of Lois Andison, Simone Jones, Diane Landry and Daniel Olson.

Hlady's works are generally sculptural works and installations composed of everyday materials activated by electronic and mechanical systems, often reflecting the social systems that created them. Her works tend to follow a system-based approach to composition. Her major works include "Drumming Displaced into Different Sized Jam Jars", a large series of sculpture in the collection of The Art Gallery of Ontario, and "Waltzing Matilda", a kinetic sculpture that has exhibited extensively.

She has an MFA in sculpture (York University, 1990) and a BFA (1987) from University of Victoria.

== Artistic career ==
Hlady first gained notice for her kinetic installation "neutralized feelings of apprehension," at G76 in Toronto, which was enthusiastically reviewed by Kate Taylor of The Globe and Mail. Her solo installation "Beauty" at the Koffler Gallery in Toronto, was curated by John Massier in 1992. After exhibiting her kinetic work "Waltzing Matilda" at Peregrine Gallery, which was reviewed by Gillian MacKay of the Globe and Mail, she had group and solo exhibitions at The Power Plant in Toronto. Her work "Drumming Displaced into Different Sized Jam Jars" was purchased by the Art Gallery of Ontario in 1999. In 2012 she had a major solo exhibition at Hallwalls in Buffalo, New York.

Hlady describes her studio practice as a play between content, form, functionality, and material, where material stands to mean as much what is heard as what is seen. Hlady is interested in the various relationships inherent in her work, from the relationships between the work, the space it occupies, and the ways the viewer interacts with the work in the space.

== Awards ==
In 2002, she was nominated for the Sobey Art Award.

== Major collections ==
Hlady's work is in the public collection of the Art Gallery of Ontario and the National Gallery of Canada.

== Major exhibitions ==
- Neutralized Feelings of Apprehension, Gallery 76, Toronto, Ontario, 1991
- Beauty, Koffler Loggia Gallery, Toronto, Ontario, 1992
- Gallerie Christiane Chassay, Montreal, Quebec, 1993
- "Naked State: A Selected View of Toronto Art", The Power Plant, Toronto, Ontario, 1994
- Gallerie Christiane Chassay, Montreal, Quebec, 1995
- "Blink", The Power Plant, Toronto, Ontario, 1996
- Gallerie Christiane Chassay, Montreal, Quebec, 1997
- "Machines Festives", La Centrale, Montreal, Quebec, 1999
- The Power Plant, Toronto, Ontario, 2001
- The Gallery, University of Toronto at Scarborough, Toronto, Ontario, 2001
- Marla Hlady: Shelf Works, Neutral Ground, Regina, Saskatchewan, 2002
- Art Gallery of Calgary, Calgary, Alberta, 2003
- Owen's Art Gallery, Sackville, New Brunswick, 2004
- "The Idea of North", Iceland and Canada (touring), 2005
- Playing Piano, Gallery YYZ, Toronto, Ontario, 2008
- Marla Hlady: Rooms, Oakville Galleries, Oakville, Ontario, 2011
- Marla Hlady: Walls, Hallwalls Contemporary Arts Center, 2012

== Works ==
- this abandoned house, 1991
- Neutralized Feelings of Apprehension, 1991
- Beauty, 1992
- off-roader 1, 1994
- Gut Machines, 1994–95
- Drumming Displaced into Different Sized Jam Jars, 1999
- Waltzing Matilda, 2000
- She Moves Through the Fair (Pipe Whistle), 2001
- Playing Piano, 2008

== Publications ==
Eden, essays by Xandra; Fischer, Barbara; Campbell, Nancy (2001). Marla Hlady. Toronto, Ont., Canada: Power Plant. ISBN 0-921047-97-5.
