= Sonology =

Science of electronic sound

Sonology is a neologism used to describe the study of sound in a variety of disciplines.

In medicine, the term is used in the field of [imaging] to describe the practice of medical ultrasonography. According to some scholars, sonology may represent a more advanced application of clinical sonography, chiefly due to the requirement for the use of critical application of both cognitive and radiographic skills in making the diagnostic determination at the time of bedside application of focused ultrasound.

The term is also used to describe interdisciplinary research in the field of electronic music and computer music, drawing upon disciplines such as acoustics, electronics, informatics, composition and psychoacoustics. This sense of the term is widely associated with the Institute of Sonology, which was established by composer Gottfried Michael Koenig at the University of Utrecht in 1967 and later moved to the Royal Conservatory of The Hague in 1986. The term has also been adopted to describe the study of electronic music at other institutions, including the Center for Computational Sonology (now "Sound and Music Computing") at the University of Padua, Kunitachi College of Music in Tokyo, at the Catalonia College of Music in Barcelona and the Federal University of Minas Gerais in Brazil.
