= Longina =

Scientific classification
- Kingdom: Animalia
- Phylum: Arthropoda
- Class: Insecta
- Order: Diptera
- Family: Neriidae
- Genus: Longina; Wiedemann, 1830

Type species
- Longina abdominalis Wiedemann, 1830

Synonyms
- Diateina Gray, 1832; Diatina Agassiz, 1846; Macrotoma Laporte, 1832

Genus of flies

Longina is a genus of flies in the family Neriidae.

== Species ==
- Longina abdominalis Wiedemann, 1830
- Longina anguliceps Buck & Marshall, 2004
- Longina semialba Buck & Marshall, 2004
