= List of classical Japanese texts =

This is a list of texts written in classical Japanese, grouped by genres and in chronological order.

== Genres ==
=== Buddhism ===
- Sangyō Gisho
  - Shōmangyō Gisho (611)
  - Yuimagyō Gisho (613)
  - Hokke Gisho (615)
- Gangōji Garan Engi (747)
- Shin'yaku Kegonkyō Ongi Shiki (late Nara period)
- Sangō Shiiki (794)
- Ōjōyōshū (985)
- heike nōkyō (1164)
- Senchaku Hongan Nenbutsushū (1189)
- Shōbōgenzō (mid 13th century)
- Kyogyoshinsho (Kamakura period)
- Tannisho (late Kamakura period)
- Denkoroku (late Kamakura period)

=== Confucianism and philosophy ===
- Go Rin no Sho 1645
- Fudōchi Shinmyōroku (unknown)
- Rongo Shitsuchu (1600)
- Okina Mondō (1641)
- Daigaku Kuwakumon (1655–1658)
- Seikyo Yoroku (1665)
- Shugi Washo (1673)
- Gomo Jiki (1683)
- Banmin Tokuyo (early 16th century)
- Santokushō (early 16th century)
- Dojimon (1704)
- Shugi Gaisho (1709)
- Rongo Kogi (1712)
- Yojokun (1713)
- Seiyō Kibun (1715)
- Bendo (1717)
- Benmei (1717)
- Oritaku Shiba no Ki (started in 1716), finished before the writer's death in 1725)
- Seidan (written between 1716 and 1736)
- Tohi Mondo (1739)
- Shutsujo Kougo (1744)
- Shizen Shineido (partially published between 1751 and 1764)
- Kokuiko (1765)
- Naobinomitama (1771)
- Gengo (1775)
- Sobo Kigen (1788)
- Uiyamabumi (1799)
- Shutsujo Shogo (1811)
- Rangaku Kotohajime (1814)
- Kyukeidan (1815)
- Yume no Shiro (1820)
- Kodo Taii (1824)
- Tsugi (completed in 1832, published in 1847)
- Senshin Dosakki (1833)
- Kyuo Dowa (1835)
- Jurinhyo (1836)
- Genshi Shiroku
  - Genshiroku (1824)
  - Genshi Koroku (1838)
  - Genshi Banroku (1850)
  - Genshi Tetsuroku (1852)
- Komo Yowa (1855)
- Ugen (1855)
- Bimiyu Genko (mid 19th century)
- Ninomiyaou Yowa (late 19th century)

=== Diary ===
- Nittō Guhō Junreikōki (836-847)
- Kanpyō Gyoki (887-897), written by Emperor Uda
- Teishin Kōki (908-948), written by Fujiwara no Tadahira
- Tosa Nikki (c. 935), written by Ki no Tsurayuki
- Kagerō Nikki (c. 974)
- Midō Kampakuki (998-1021), written by Fujiwara no Michinaga
- Gonki (991-1017), written by Fujiwara no Yukinari
- Shōyūki (982-1032), written by Fujiwara no Sanesuke
- Izumi Shikibu Nikki (1008), written by Izumi Shikibu
- Murasaki Shikibu Nikki (The Murasaki Shikibu Diary) (1008–10)
- Sarashina Nikki (1020–59)
- Shunki (1038–54), written by Fujiwara no Sukefusa
- Tokinoriki (1075–1108), written by Taira no Tokinori
- Gonijō Moromichi-ki (1083–99), written by Fujiwara no Moromichi
- Chūyūki (1087–1132), written by Fujiwara no Munetada
- Heihanki (1132–71), written by Taira no Nobunori
- Taiki (1136–55), written by Fujiwara no Yorinaga
- Gyokuyō (1164–1200), written by Fujiwara no Kanezane
- Meigetsuki (1180–1235), written by Fujiwara no Teika
- Heikoki (1196–1246), written by Taira no Tsunetaka
- Sanuki no Suke Nikki, written by Fujiwara no Nagako
- Towazugatari (1271–1306), written by Go-Fukakusa In no Nijō
- Izayoi Nikki (c. 1283), written by Abutsu-ni
- Nakatsukasa no Naishi Nikki (1280–92), written by Fujiwara no Tsuneko
- Entairyaku (1311–60), written by Tōin Kinkata
- Hanazono Tennō Shinki (1310–32), written by Emperor Hanazono
- Kanmon Nikki (1416–48), written by Prince Sadafusa
- Sakkaiki (1418–48), written by Nakayama Sadachika
- Chikamoto Nikki (1465–86), written by Ninagawa Chikamoto
- Tokikuni Kyōki (1474–1502), written by Yamashina Tokikuni
- Sanetaka Kōki (1474–1536), written by Sanjōnishi Sanetaka
- Nobutane Kyōki (1480–1522), written by Nakamikado Nobutane
- Tokitsugu Kyōki (1527–76), written by Yamashina Tokitsugu
- Uwai Kakuken Nikki (1574–86), written by Uwai Satokane
- Tokitsune Kyōki (1576–1608), written by Yamashina Tokitsune
- Tamonnin Nikki (1478–1618), written by Eishun and others
- Honkō Kokushi Nikki (1610–33), written by Ishin Sūden

=== Dictionary, Encyclopedia ===
- Tenrei Banshō Meigi (830-835)
- Shinsen Jikyō (898-901)
- Wamyō Ruijushō (934)
- Ruiju Myōgishō (1081–1100)
- Iroha Jiruishō (1144–65)
- Jikyōshū (c. 1245)
- Kagakushū (1444)
- Setsuyōshū (1469–87)
- Onkochishinsho (1484)
- Wagokuhen (c. 1489)
- Nippo Jisho (1603)
- Wakan Sansai Zue (1713)

=== Fable and novel ===
- Suigakuki (late Nara period)
- Nihon Ryōiki (810-824)
- Yamato Monogatari (956)
- Sanpō Ekotoba (984)
- Nihon Ōjō Gokurakuki (985-986)
- Taketori Monogatari (early 10th century)
- Utsubo Monogatari (c. 989)
- Genji Monogatari (c. 1008)
- Honchō Hokke Genki (1040)
- Ise Monogatari (early Heian period)
- Hamamatsu Chūnagon Monogatari (late Heian period, late 11th century)
- Kohon Setsuwashū (late Heian period)
- Sagoromo Monogatari (late Heian period)
- Torikaebaya Monogatari (late Heian period)
- Yoru no Nezame (late Heian period)
- Heichū Monogatari (Heian period)
- Honchō Shinsenden (Heian Period)
- Ochikubo Monogatari (Heian period)
- Gōdanshō (1104–1108)
- Uchigikishū (1134?)
- Matsuuramiya Monogatari (1193?)
- Konjaku Monogatarishū (early 12th century)
- Tsutsumi Chūnagon Monogatari (late 12th century)
- Hobutsushu (early Kamakura period)
- Hosshinshū (early Kamakura period)
- Sumiyoshi Monogatari (early Kamakura period)
- Takamura Monogatari (late Heian to early Kamakura period)
- Uji Shūi Monogatari (early Kamakura period, early 13th century)
- Ima Monogatari (mid Kamakura period, after 1239)
- Towazugatari (late Kamakura period)
- Iwashimizu Monogatari (Kamakura period)
- Koke no Koromo (Kamakura period)
- Senjoshū (Kamakura period)
- Jikkunshō (1252)
- Kokin Chomonjo (1254)
- Shasekishū (1283)
- Otogizōshi (collected from Muromachi to Edo period)
- Kazashi no Himegimi (Muromachi period)
- Seisuishō (1628)
- Isoho Monogatari (Azuchi Momoyama period)
- Ugetsu Monogatari (1776)
- Ukiyoburo (1809–1813)
- Tōkaidōchū Hizakurige (1802–1814)

=== Go and shogi ===
- Igoshiki (1199)
- Shōgi Zushiki (1636), written by Ōhashi Sōko
- Sho Shōgi Zushiki (1694)
- Shōgi Rokushu no Zushiki (unknown)
- Igo Hatsuyōron (1713)
- Shogi Kenshoku (1804)

=== History ===
- Jūshichi-jō Kenpō (604)
- Kokki (620)
- Tennōki (620)
- Ōmiryō (668)
- Teiki (681)
- Asuka Kiyomihara Ritsuryō (681-689)
- Iki no Hakatoko no Sho (late 7th century)
- Taihō Ritsuryō (701)
- Jōgū Shōtoku Hōō Teisetsu (c. 710)
- Kyūji (< 712)
- Kojiki (712)
- Yōrō Ritsuryō (718)
- Nihon Shoki (720)
- Fudoki (712-733?)
  - Hitachi Fudoki (715)
  - Harima no Kuni Fudoki (715)
  - Bungo no Kuni Fudoki (>732)
  - Izumu no Kuni Fudoki (733)
- Tōshi Kaden (c. 760–766)
- Takahashi Ujibumi (c. 789)
- Shoku Nihongi (797)
- Kogo Shūi (807)
- Shinsen Shōjiroku (815)
- Nihon Kōki (840)
- Shoku Nihon Kōki (869)
- Nihon Montoku Tennō Jitsuroku (879)
- Ruijū Kokushi (892)
- Nihon Sandai Jitsuroku (901)
- Engishiki (927)
- Eiga Monogatari (late Heian period)
- Ōkagami (late Heian period)
- Kuji Hongi (Heian period)
- Shōmonki (c. 940)
- Fusō Ryakuki (12th century)
- Imakagami (c. 1170 and 1178)
- Mizukagami (late 12th century)
- Hogen Monogatari (1220?)
- Azuma Kagami (late 13th century)
- Shaku Nihongi (late 13th century)
- Genpei Seisuiki (late Kamakura period)
- Jinnō Shōtōki (1339?)
- Heike Monogatari (1371)
- Masukagami (1374?)
- Taiheiki (late 14th century)
- Baishōron (Muromachi period)
- Gikeiki (Muromachi period)
- Sandaiki (early Muromachi period)
- Soga Monogatari (early Muromachi period)
- Meitokuki (late Muromachi period)
- Gukanshō (1465)
- Oninki (late 15th century)
- Shinchoki (1600?) - Commonly called Shinchokoki
- Shinchoki (1604)
- Mikawa Monogatari (1625–1626)
- Nihon Ōdai Ichiran (1652)
- Taikōki (1625–1661)
- Honchō Tsugan (1644–1647, 1670)
- Kouyou Gunkanki (early 17th century)
- Hankanfu (1702)
- Tokushi Yoron (1712)
- Koshitsu (1716)
- Sangoku Tsūran Zusetsu (1785)
- Kaikoku Heidan (1791)
- Keisei Hisaku (1789–1801)
- Saiiki Monogatari (around 18th century)
- Nihon Gaishi (early 18th century)
- Ryushi Shinron (mid 18th century)
- Kondo Hisaku (late Edo period)
- Nihon Seiki (late Edo period)
- Shinron (late Edo period)
- Shoku Hankanfu (1806)
- Yasou Dokugo (1806)
- Keikodan (1813)
- Shinkiron (1838)
- Yume Monogatari (1838)
- Kaitenshishi (1844)
- Tokushi Zeigi (1852)
- Seikenroku (1854)
- Shozan Taiwa (1864)
- Shozan Kanwa (1865)
- Hikawa Seiwa (1897)
- Dai Nihon Shi (started in 1657, completed in 1906)

=== Mathematics, science ===
- Ishinpō (984)
- Jinkōki (1627)
- Katsuyo Sanpo (mid Edo period)
- Kenkon Bensetsu (mid Edo period)
- Hatsubi Sanpō (1674)
- Kyuritsu (1836)
- Sekka Zusetsu (1835)
- Zoku Sekka Zusetsu (1840)

=== Poetry ===
==== Kanshi ====
- Kaifūsō (751)
- Ryōunshū (814)
- Bunka Shūreishū (c. 818)
- Keikokushū (827)
- Fusōshū (c. 995–999)
- Wakan Rōeishū (c. 1013)
- Honchō Monzui (mid 11th century)
- Gōrihōshū (c. 1071)
- Wakankensakushū (1277–79)

==== Waka ====
- Bussokuseki-kahi (c. 753)
- Man'yōshū (>759)
- Kakyō Hyōshiki (772)
- Shinsen Man'yōshū (early 10th century)
- Iseshū (after 939)
- Amanotekorashū (late 10th century)
- Tomonorishū (late 10th century)
- Kingyoku Wakashū (1007–11)
- Wakanrōeishū (1018)
- Yorizaneshū (after 1044)
- Zōkihōshishū (mid 11th century)
- Shōryōshū (1078)
- Gensanmi Yorimasashū (1173–78)
- Chōshūeisō (1178)
- Tsuneiekyōshū (c. 1182)
- Sankashū (late 12th century)
- Kinkai Wakashū (c. 1213)
- Kenrei-mon In Ukyō No Daibu Shū (c. 1233)
- Fūyō Wakashū (1271)
- Wakankensakushū (1277–79)
- Shokugenyō Wakashū (1323–24)
- Shūgyokushū (c. 1328)
- Renri Hishō (c. 1349)
- Tsukubashū (1356)
- Shinyō Wakashū (1381)
- Shinsen Tsukubashū (1495)
- Kanginshū (1518)
- Shinsen Inutsukubashū (after 1524)
- Nijūichidaishū (21 imperial collections of Japanese poetry)
1. Kokin Wakashū (c. 920)
2. Gosen Wakashū (951)
3. Shūi Wakashū (1005–1007)
4. Goshūi Wakashū (1086)
5. Kin'yō Wakashū (1124–27)
6. Shika Wakashū (1151–54)
7. Senzai Wakashū (1187)
8. Shin Kokin Wakashū (1205)
9. Shinchokusen Wakashū (1234)
10. Shokugosen Wakashū (1251)
11. Shokukokin Wakashū (1265)
12. Shokushūi Wakashū (1278)
13. Shingosen Wakashū (1303)
14. Gyokuyō Wakashū (1313–14)
15. Shokusenzai Wakashū (1320)
16. Shokugoshūi Wakashū (1325–26)
17. Fūga Wakashū (1344–46)
18. Shinsenzai Wakashū (1359)
19. Shinshūi Wakashū (1364)
20. Shingoshūi Wakashū (1383–84)
21. Shinshokukokin Wakashū (1439)

==== Haikai ====
- Fuyu no hi (1684)
- Haru No Hi (1686)
- Arano (1689)
- Hisago (1690)
- Sarumino (1691)
- Sumidawara (1694)
- Oku no Hosomichi (1702)

=== Zuihitsu ===
- Chiteiki (982)
- Makura no Sōshi (1002)
- Hōjōki (1212)
- Tsurezuregusa (c. 1330)

== See also ==
- List of Japanese poetry anthologies
- List of National Treasures of Japan (writings)
