= Tokushi Zeigi =

The Tokushi Zeigi (読史贅議) is an analysis of Japanese historic persons by Saitō Chikudō. This book covers both politicians and servicemen. Tokushi Zeigi is different from other Japanese history books of those days. Chikudō evaluated historic persons by their political ability, not their personal morality.

== Contents ==
Volume 1

- Yamato Takeru(日本武尊)
- Prince Shōtoku(厩戸皇子)
- Nomi no Sukune (野見宿祢)
- Takenouchi no Sukune (武内宿祢)
- Mononobe no Moriya (物部守屋)
- Wake no Kiyomaro (和気清麻呂)
- Kibi Makibi (吉備真備)
- Fujiwara no Kamatari (中臣鎌足)
- Fujiwara no Yasunori (藤原保則)
- Sugawara no Michizane (菅原道真)
- Miyoshi Kiyotsura (三善清行)
- Minamoto no Yoshiie (源義家)
- Minamoto no Yoshimitsu (源義光)
- Fujiwara no Michinori (藤原通憲)・Taira no Kiyomori (平清盛)
- Minamoto no Yorimasa (源頼政)
- Taira no Shigemori (平重盛)
- Taira no Tomomori (平知盛)・Minamoto no Yoritomo (源頼朝)
- Kiso no Yoshinaka(木曾義仲)

Volume 2

- Minamoto no Yoshitsune (源義経)
- Hōjō Tokimasa (北条時政)
- Ōe no Hiromoto (大江広元)
- Hatakeyama Shigetada(畠山重忠)
- Wada Yoshimori (和田義盛)
- Hōjō Masako(平政子)
- Hōjō Yasutoki (北条泰時)
- Aoto Fujitsuna (青砥藤綱)
- Hōjō Sadatoki (北条貞時)
- Fujiwara Fujifusa (藤原藤房)
- Kitabatake Chikafusa (北畠親房)
- Kitabatake Akiie (北畠顕家)
- Nitta Yoshisada (新田義貞)
- Nitta Yoshisuke (脇屋義助)
- Kusunoki Masashige (楠木正成)
- Kusunoki Masatsura (楠正行)
- Ashikaga Takauji (足利尊氏)
- Ashikaga Yoshimitsu (足利義満)
- Ashikaga Motouji (足利基氏)
- Akamatsu Norimura (赤松則村)
- Hoskawa Yoriyuki (細川頼之)

Volume 3

- Emperor Jimmu (神武天皇)
- Emperor Nintoku (仁徳天皇)
- Emperor Tenji (天智天皇)
- Prince Ōtomo (大友皇子)
- Emperor Uda (宇多天皇)
- Emperor Go-Sanjō (後三条天皇)
- Emperor Go-Toba (後鳥羽天皇)
- Abe no Hirafu (阿部比羅夫)

== See also ==
- Tokushi Yoron
- Historiography
- Philosophy of history
