= Ootakemaru =

Figure in Japanese folklore

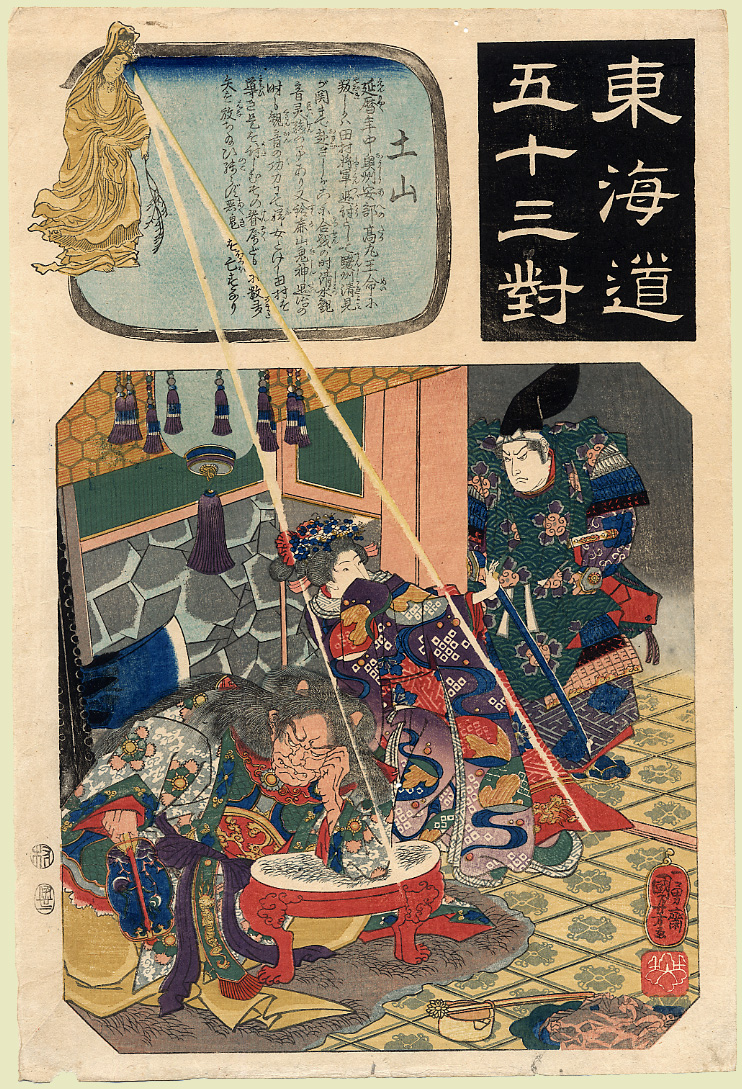
By Utagawa Kuniyoshi. From left to right, Ootakemaru, Suzuka Gozen, Sakanoue no Tamuramaro

Ootakemaru (大嶽丸, also sometimes called 鬼神魔王、大だけ丸、or 大竹丸) is a figure in Japanese folklore. He resides on Suzuka Mountain, a connection of mountains and ravines bordering the Ise and Oumi countries. He lived during the reign of Emperor Kanmu (781-806) and was one of the chief enemies of shogun Sakanoue no Tamuramaro. Ootakemaru mostly connected to the story of Sakanoue no Tamuromaro's oni extermination. He is considered one of the Great Three Evil Yokai of Japan [jp] alongside Shuten-dōji and Tamamo-no-Mae.

Ootakemaru was said to be able to manipulate the weather such as storms and thunder, capable of creating dark clouds to cover Suzuka Mountain that rained fire.

== In popular culture ==
=== Music ===
- Ōtakemaru is a song by Onmyōza, released on their 2025 album

=== Games ===
- Onmyōji – Ootakemaru appears as an NPC and boss
- Nioh 2 – Ootakemaru appears as the main antagonist of the game and its DLC
- Fate/Extra – in the FoxTail manga, he was mentioned in Suzuka Gozen's backstory

== Attribution ==
- Content in this edit is translated from the existing Japanese Wikipedia article at jp:大嶽丸; see its history for attribution.
