= Suzuka Gozen =

Figure from Japanese folklore

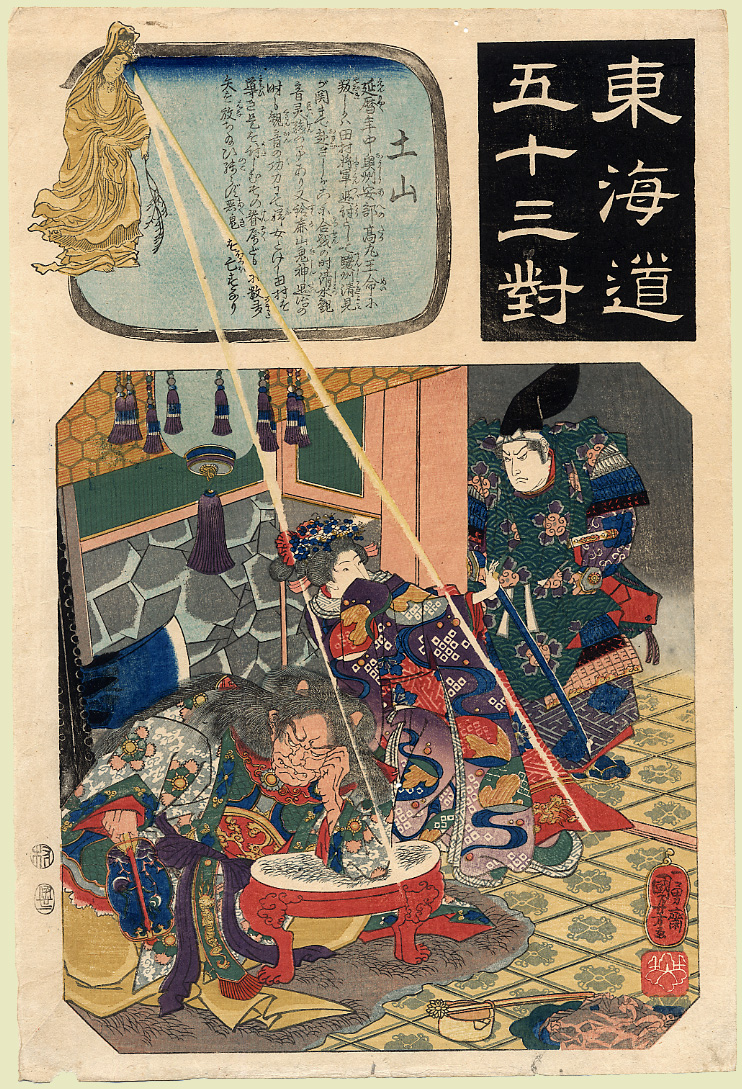
The 53 stations of the Tōkaidō in pairs by Utagawa Kuniyoshi depicting, from the left, the demon of Mount Suzuka, Suzuka Gozen and Sakanoue no Tamuramaro led by her to kill the demon.

Suzuka Gozen (鈴鹿御前) is a figure in Japanese folklore. She is described in the Muromachi era traveler's journal "Kouunkikou" (耕雲紀行), the fairytale "Tamura no Soushi" and the Hobutsushu written by Tairano Yasuyori in 1179, among others. She is also referred to as Tate Eboshi (立烏帽子), Suzuka Gongen (鈴鹿権現) and Princess Suzuka (鈴鹿姫). In folklore, she is a female thief, a celestial maiden (天女), or even a female oni, and her true form, depictions, and other information are varied, but from the Muromachi era onward, the legend was mostly connected to the story of Sakanoue no Tamuramaro's oni extermination. She is often assiocated with Ootakemaru.

== In fiction ==
Suzuka Gozen appears in the Type-Moon's Fate franchise: she is a principal character in the Japanese manga Fate/Extra CCC FoxTail, and is a playable character in the mobile game Fate/Grand Order.

She appears in the manga Ogre Slayer.

Suzuka Gozen appears as a playable character in turn-based fantasy strategy game Onmyoji, developed and published by internet company NetEase, as well as its accompanying games Onmyoji Arena and Onmyoji: The Card Game.

Suzuka Gozen makes an appearance in Nioh 2, serving as the protagonist's mother under the name "Miyoshino". In the third DLC, "The First Samurai", Miyoshino is revealed to have gone by the name Suzuka in the distant past, with her appearance and nature as an oni samurai implying that she is Suzuka Gozen. An entirely separate character based on Suzuka Gozen, named Tate Eboshi, also appears in "The First Samurai", portrayed as a bandit turned scythe-wielding yokai by the main antagonist of the game, Otakemaru, and serves as a boss.

Suzuka Gongen appears in the video game Persona 4 as Chie's 2nd tier persona.

Suzuka Gozen appears as a playable survivor in Zombicide: White Death. The character was unlocked as the $1.06 million stretch goal and was a Kickstarter exclusive.
