= Sakanoue no Tamuramaro =

Japanese general and shogun (758 – 811)

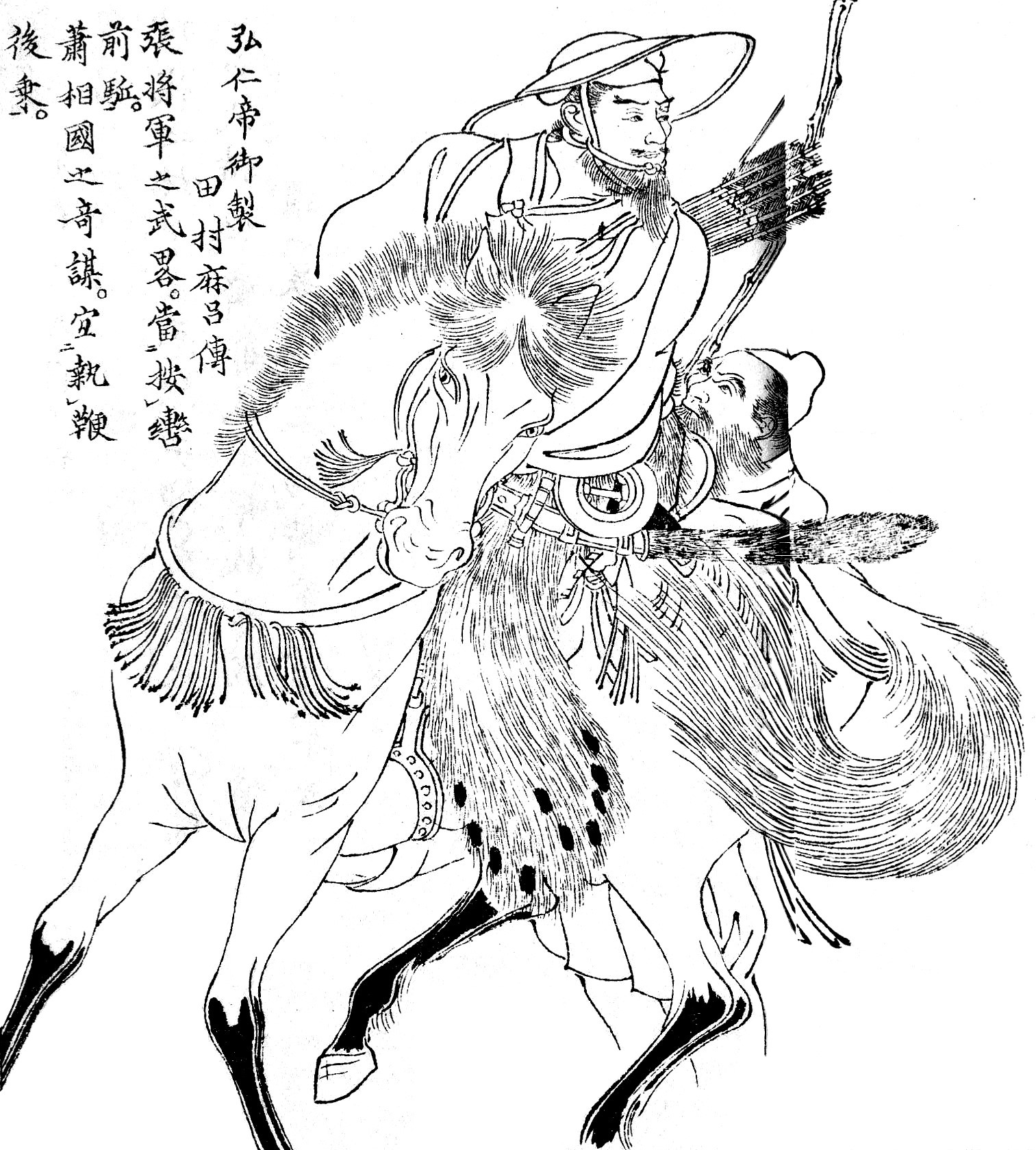
Sakanoue no Tamuramaro by Kikuchi Yōsai

Sakanoue no Tamuramaro (坂上 田村麻呂; Japanese pronunciation: [sa.ka.noꜜ.ɯ.e no | ta.mɯ.ɾaꜜ.ma.ɾo], 758 – June 17, 811) was a court noble, general and shōgun of the early Heian period of Japan. He served as Dainagon, Minister of War and Ukon'e no Taisho (Major Captain of the Right Division of Inner Palace Guards). He held the kabane of Ōsukune and the court rank of Junior Second Rank and was awarded the Order of Second Class.

He was the son of Sakanoue no Karitamaro. He was considered an avatar of Bishamonten in legend.

== Military career ==
Serving Emperor Kanmu, Tamuramaro was appointed shōgun and given the task of conquering the Emishi (蝦夷征伐 Emishi Seibatsu), a people native to the north of Honshū, which he subjugated. Recent evidence suggests that a migration of Emishi from northern Honshū to Hokkaidō took place sometime between the seventh and eighth centuries, perhaps as a direct result of this policy that pre-dated Tamuramaro's appointment. However, many Emishi remained in the Tōhoku region as subjects of the expanding Japanese Empire and later established independent Fushu domains. After Emperor Kanmu's death, the general continued to serve Emperor Heizei and Emperor Saga as Major Counselor (大納言, dainagon) and Minister of War (兵部卿, Hyōbu-kyō). He was the second person to be given the title of Sei-i Taishōgun (征夷大将軍). The first to receive this title was Ōtomo no Otomaro.

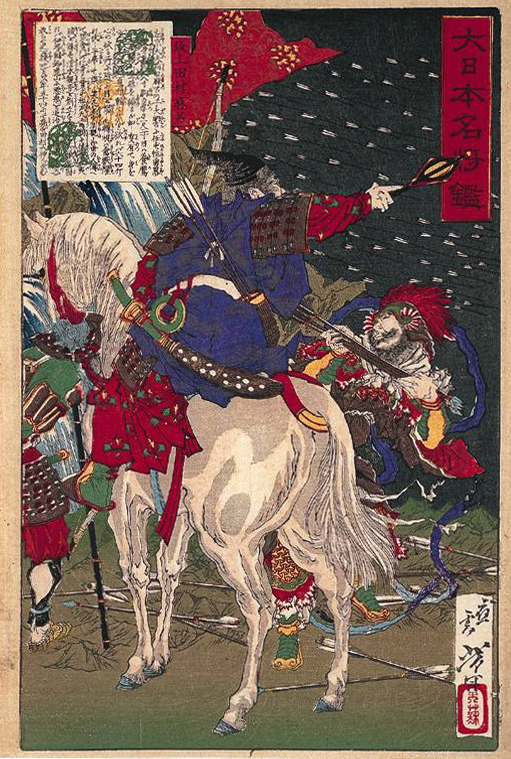
Sakanoue Tamuramaro in a rain of arrows

It is said that the famous Tanabata festivals and parades of Aomori Prefecture (also celebrated in the city of Sendai in Miyagi prefecture), which draw over 3 million people to the prefecture a year, were popularised in remembrance of Sakanoue no Tamuramaro's campaign to subdue the tribal societies then living in Tōhoku. These annual matsuri are called the Nebuta festival in Aomori City and Neputa Festival (ねぷた祭り) in Hirosaki City. They feature a number of gigantic, specially-constructed, illuminated paper floats. These huge festival structures are colourfully painted with mythical figures, and teams of men carry them through the streets as crowds shout encouragement. Aomori's great nebuta lanterns are said to hark back to Tamuramaro's innovative strategy in that early ninth century campaign. According to legend, the taishogun is remembered for having ordered huge illuminated lanterns to be placed at the top of hills; and when the curious Emishi approached these bright lights to investigate, they were captured and subdued. Until the mid-1990s the prize awarded for the best float of the parades was called the Tamuramaro Prize. However, there is no historical record that Tamuramaro went farther north than Iwate Prefecture.

Tamuramaro's name is linked with payments for construction projects at Kiyomizu Temple (Kiyomizu-dera) in the late 8th century.

The Azuma Kagami tells a story of when Fujiwara no Toshihito had fought together with Sakanoue no Tamuramaro to subdue a gang of Emishi bandits that had stood in their way when the duo were passing through the Taya Caves on their way back to Kamakura.

== Death, memorial and legends ==
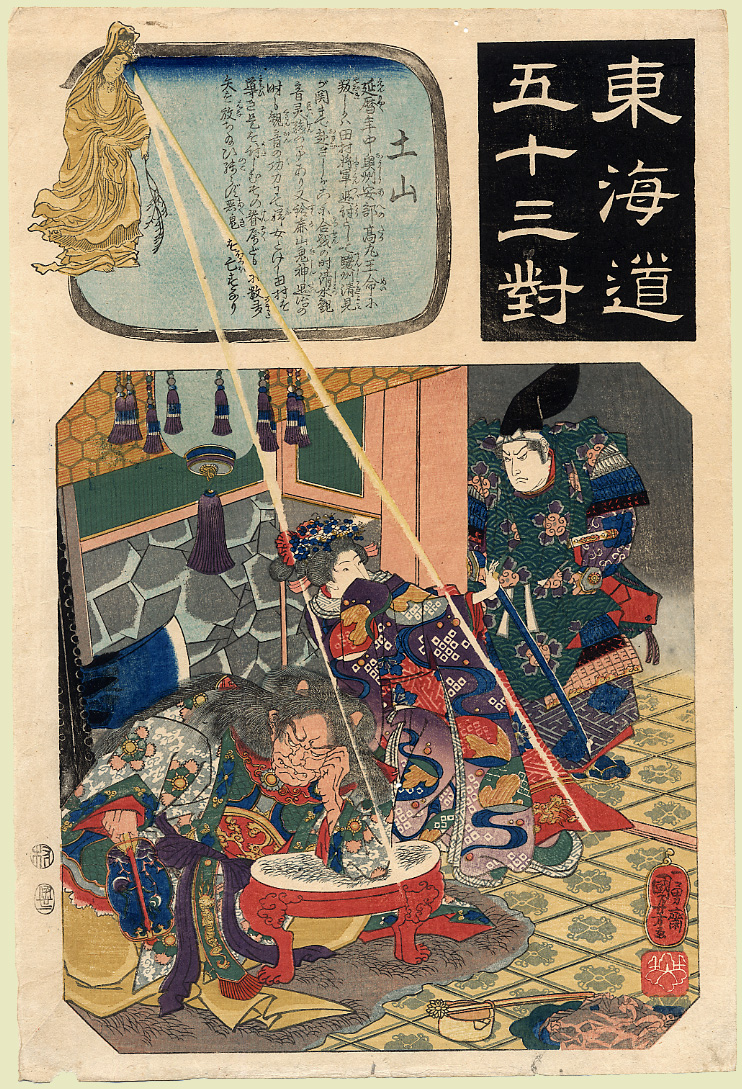
The 53 stations of the Tōkaidō in pairs by Utagawa Kuniyoshi depicting, from the left, the demon of Mount Suzuka, Suzuka Gozen and Sakanoue no Tamuramaro led by her to kill the demon Otakemaru.

In the year 811 (Kōnin 2, 3rd month), Tamuramaro died at age 54, to the great regret of Emperor Saga, who expressed his sense of loss by distributing large quantities of silk cloth, cotton cloth and rice in honour of his dead counsellor. His bow, arrows, quiver and sword were placed in his coffin by order of the Emperor.

The Tomb of Sakanoue no Tamuramaro is located in Kanshuji Higashikurisunocho, Yamashina Ward, Kyoto, Japan. He is not the samurai buried at Shōgun-zuka as that was a ceremonial statue of a warrior buried by Emperor Kanmu when he decided to move the capital to Heian-kyo, present day Kyoto. His descendant Urabe no Suetake inherited his bow.

After his death, Tamuramaro became a legendary figure featured in many stories. In these legends, Tamuramaro is not always a warrior who wages war against barbarians, but a hero who exterminates oni and bandits in various areas. According to legend, Ootakemaru, one of the Great Three Evil Yokai of Japan, was slain by Tamuramaro. Other stories connect him to Suzuka Gozen, whom he marries and/or slays. He had a daughter with her named Shourin. According to the Otogi-zoshi, Shourin is said to have become the guardian deity of the Suzuka Mountains, while in the Okujoruri, it is said she ascended to the level of the Jizō Bodhisattva after her death. He had the swords named Sohaya no Tsurugi and Sanmyo no Ken. He was blessed by Senju Kannon and Takeminakata.

== Ancestry ==
Tamuramaro's family, the Sakanoue clan, was a cadet branch of the Yamato no Aya clan from Baekje according to the Nihon Shoki (720). The Yamato no Aya clan's founder, Achi no Omi was first mentioned in an older source called the Kojiki (712) before being mentioned again in the Nihon Shoki. However, later stories found in sources such as the Shoku Nihongi (797) and Shinsen Shōjiroku (815) claim that Achi no Omi was in fact a descendant of Chinese emperors (Shoku Nihongi claiming descent from Emperor Ling of Han while Shinsen Shōjiroku claimed descent from Emperor Xian of Han). However in recent years, the claim surrounding the existence of Achi no Omi is heavily scrutinized with the Yamato no Aya clan being classified of being Gaya descent (specifically from Ara Gaya) therefore, making the Sakanoue clan being of Gaya descent.

The lack of extensive detail on Sakanoue no Tamuramaro’s life has led to a number of theories regarding aspects of his life, such as his birthplace, among others:

- Legend of Sakanoue no Tamuramaro
- Tamura story
- That he was of Emishi origin
- That he was born in Oshu

== Honours ==
- Senior second rank (May 27, 811; posthumous)
  - official rank at the time of death:Senior Third Rank, Senior Counselor, Major Captain of the Right Division of Inner Palace Guards (正三位, 大納言, 右近衛大将)

== See also ==
- List of shōguns
- Tamura clan
- Aterui
- Kusuko Incident
- Suzuka Gozen
- Ootakemaru
