= Harold George Parlett =

British diplomat and writer on Japanese Buddhism

- Born: 2 November 1869
- Died: 28 June 1945 (aged 75)
- Occupation: Scholar

Sir Harold George Parlett CMG (1869 – 1945) was a British consular diplomat and writer on Japanese Buddhism.

== Biography ==
Parlett was born in 1869 in England. In 1890, Parlett travelled to Japan to work as a student interpreter, later becoming the acting registrar at the British Court in Japan. A contemporary of Ernest Satow, Parlett contributed to Satow's An English-Japanese dictionary of the spoken language. In the early 1890s he assisted the collector Arthur Morrison assemble his collection of Japanese paintings, subsequently acquired by the British Museum. When in 1900 the legation was upgraded to an Embassy, he became the Japanese British Counsellor. In 1901, he published a translated edition of Sumiyoshi Monogatari. In 1919 Parlett was promoted to assistant Japanese Secretary. In 1924 he translated a series of works by Dante into Japanese for Satow and was knighted in the 1924 Birthday Honours. In 1927 he retired from diplomacy and began writing works specialising on Eastern affairs and Buddhism, writing a short memoir of Charles Eliot in 1935 and articles in the Blackwood Edinburgh Magazine. He was coaxed out of retirement during the years 1942–1945 to work in the British Foreign Office due to his knowledge of Japanese.

== Works ==
- Sumiyoshi Monogatari (Translation), 1901
- A brief account of diplomatic events in Manchuria, 1929
