= Sumiyoshi Monogatari Emaki =

- 住吉物語絵巻 (Japanese)
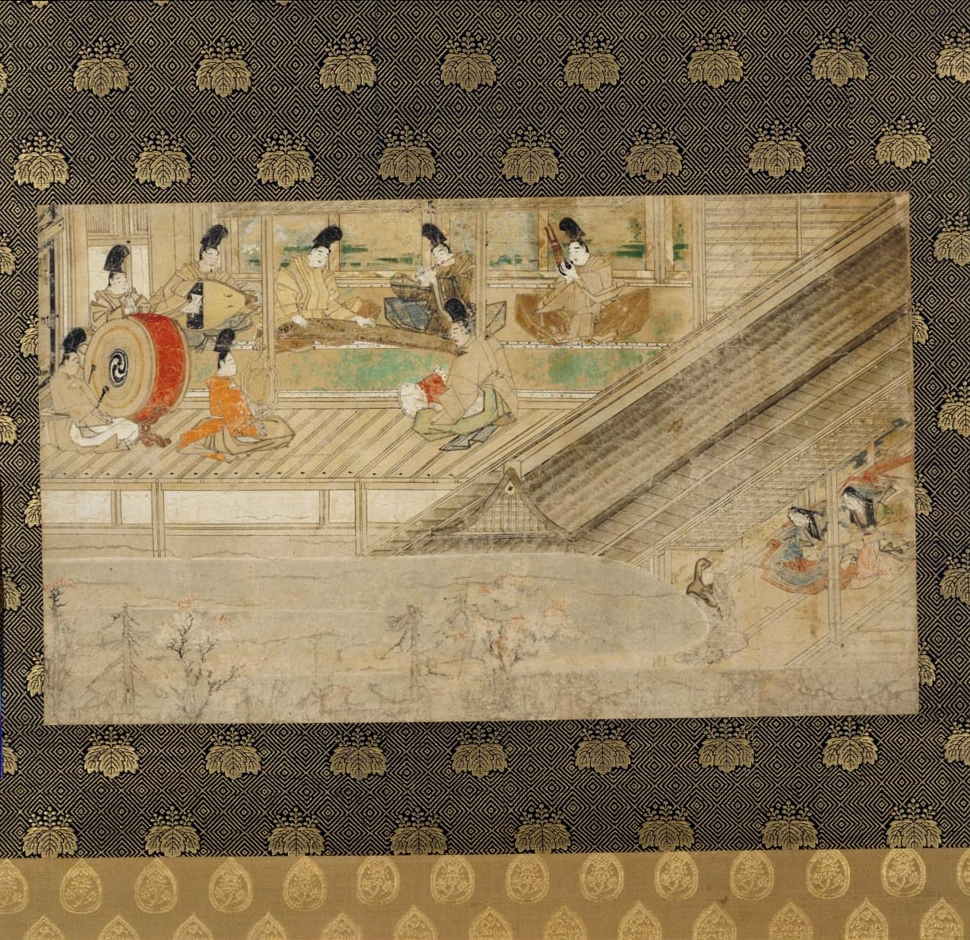
- Section detached and mounted as a kakemono
- Artist: Unknown
- Completion date: End of Kamakura period
- Medium: Emakimono; Ink on paper handscroll
- Movement: Yamato-e
- Subject: Sumiyoshi Monogatari
- Designation: Important Cultural Property
- Location: Tokyo National Museum; Metropolitan Museum of Art

The Sumiyoshi Monogatari Emaki (住吉物語絵巻) is an emakimono or emaki (painted narrative handscroll) from the Kamakura period of Japanese history (1185–1333). It depicts the Sumiyoshi Monogatari (住吉物語), a 10th-century story that narrates the misadventures of a young woman mistreated by her stepmother and her romance with a high-ranking soldier. The work is classified as an Important Cultural Property and is preserved in Tokyo National Museum, but four sections were detached during the 19th century.

== Background ==
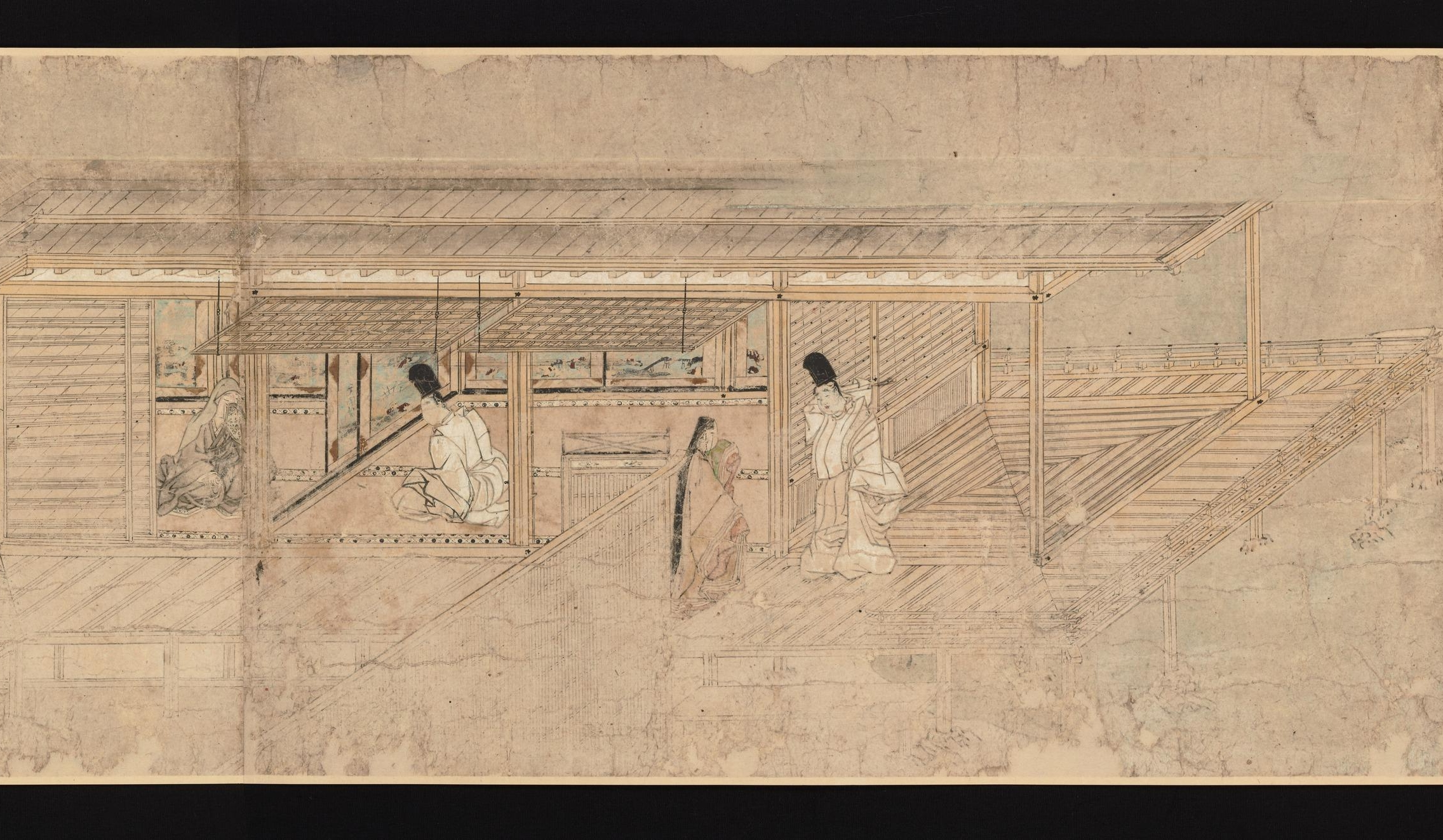
The captain inquires of a maid, and then of a nun, about his beloved

Originating in Japan in the sixth or seventh century through trade with the Chinese empire, the art of the emakimono spread widely among the aristocracy in the Heian period. An emaki consists of one or more horizontal scrolls of paper narrating a story through texts and Yamato-e paintings. The reader discovers the story by progressively unrolling the scroll with one hand while rolling it with the other hand, from right to left (according to the traditional writing direction of Japanese script), so that a section of text or image about 60 cm (24 in) wide is visible. The narrative assumes a series of scenes, the rhythm, composition and transitions of which depend on the artist's sensitivity and technique. The themes of the stories were varied: illustrations of novels, historical chronicles, religious texts, biographies of famous people, humorous or fantastic anecdotes, etc.

Illustrations of novels, stories or newspapers were appreciated by the ladies of the court during the Heian period. They included famous emakimono such as the Genji Monogatari Emaki and the Nezame Monogatari Emaki. During the Kamakura period, interest in the refined culture of the aristocrats of the Heian period continued, with the production of emakimono on the life at the court, such as the Murasaki Shikibu Nikki Emaki, the Ise Monogatari Emaki, the Makura no Sōshi Emaki and the Sumiyoshi Monogatari Emaki.

== Description ==
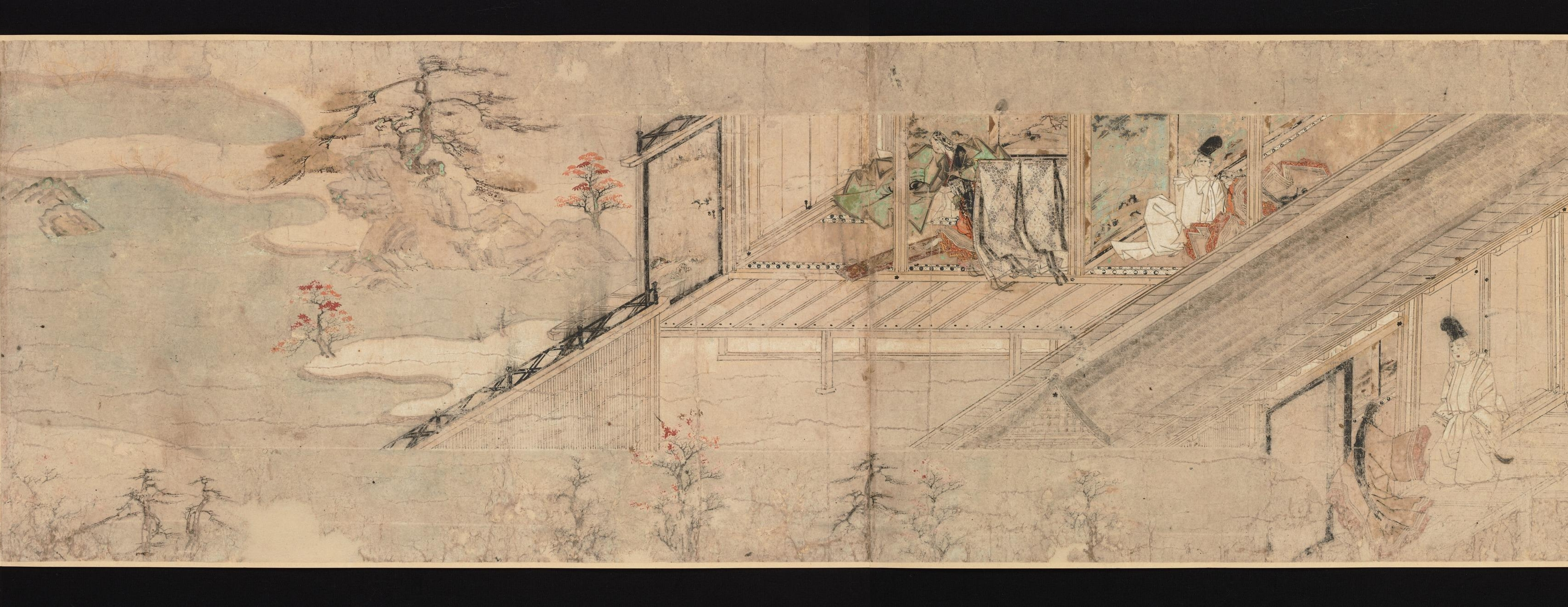
The two lovers are finally reunited

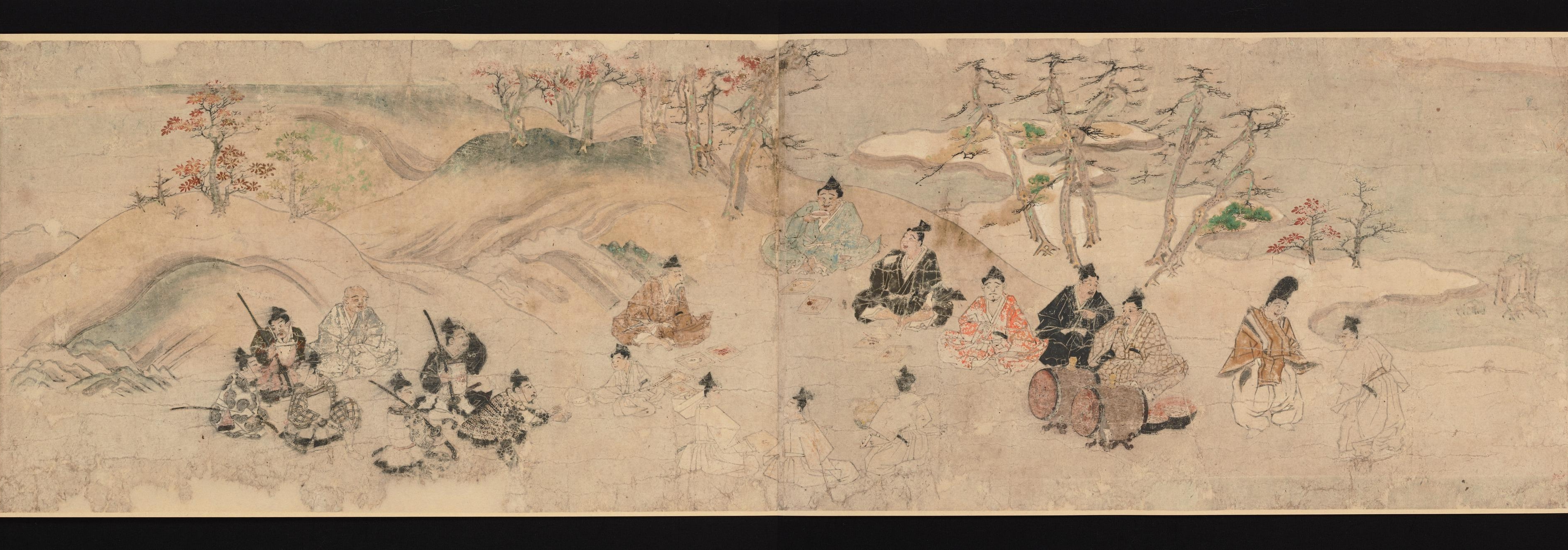
The marriage ceremony

The emakimono illustrates the Sumiyoshi Monogatari, a famous story of the 10th century, in which a young woman, the daughter of a Chūnagon (Middle Counselor), runs away from home to escape abuse from her stepmother. She falls in love with a minor captain and becomes engaged to him. Her stepmother, however, compels the minor captain to marry her own daughter instead. She also prevents the young woman from serving at the palace or marrying a watchman. When the young woman discovers the truth, she escapes to the Sumiyoshi Grand Shrine. Later, the minor captain, who has since been promoted to major captain, is taken to the shrine by a mystical dream with the help of Kannon. He and the young woman get married and live happily ever after, while the stepmother ends her life in poverty and disgrace. The story dates from the 10th century in the Heian period, but is known only from a 12th-century copy. The original tenth-century tale is attributed to the poet Sone no Yoshitada; its influence was such that the "Tamakatsura" chapter of the Genji Monogatari was written with it in mind, and later otogizōshi narratives commonly modelled themselves on its style.

== Style and composition ==
The Sumiyoshi Monogatari Emaki was created in the Yamato-e painting style. Although it belongs to the genre of the illustrations of novels of the court (monogatari), it presents a pictorial style relatively different from other works on this theme such as the Genji Monogatari Emaki. Indeed, the scroll depicts the story as a long painting in which several scenes follow one another without clear transition and without any textual interruption, an approach rarely used for monogatari.

That depiction aims to reflect the evolution of time, so that some characters appear several times in the same scene to illustrate successive phases of the story. Moreover, to represent the interior scenes, the painter did not use the classical technique of fukinuki yatai, consisting of removing the roof to show the parts of a building from an elevated a point of view; on the contrary, the scroll adopts a lower point of view and introduces interiors through openings such as windows, doors or sliding panels. The Sumiyoshi Monogatari Emaki therefore testifies to the evolution of the paintings of the court during the Kamakura period, the painters willingly deviating from the old conventions exhibited especially in the Genji Monogatari Emaki (the oldest preserved emakimono of the court).

== Provenance ==
The oldest preserved emakimono illustrating the Sumiyoshi Monogatari dates from the end of 13th century or the beginning of the 14th century, although earlier illustrations have existed in the past. That emakimono today is a single handscroll measuring 30.3 cm × 304.1 cm (11.9 in × 119.7 in), without text, but four fragments were detached at an unknown date (subsequent to 1848) and mounted as kakemono (hanging scrolls).

The Tokyo National Museum holds the handscroll and one of the detached sections. Another section is held by the Metropolitan Museum of Art in New York (since 2015); the rest belong to individuals. There is also a single fragment of the original text, of only three lines.

== Other versions ==
- The Seikadō Bunko Art Museum has a 14th-century emakimono illustrating the Sumiyoshi Monogatari and consisting of two scrolls decorated with paintings and calligraphy.
- The Kyoto National Museum has a three scroll version of the Edo period.
- The British Museum has a three-scroll version from the Edo period.

== See also ==
- List of National Treasures of Japan (paintings)
- National Treasure (Japan)
