= Katō Danzō =

Legendary ninja master (c. 1503–1569)

Katō Danzō (加藤 段蔵; c. 1503 – 1569) was a famed 16th century ninja master during the Sengoku period Japan who was also known as flying Katō (飛び加藤, Tobi Katō).

== Biography ==
There are many versions of his story and many mysteries surround him. According to the legend he practiced sorcery, performing amazing feats such as swallowing a bull in front of the crowd of over 20 people; his alias comes from his alleged ability to fly. Some researchers believe his reported magical arts were illusion as a type of group hypnosis. However, this belief has never been proven to be the case and therefore is only considered to be a possibility. His date of birth and death are unknown.

According to several chronicles during the Edo period, the daimyō Uesugi Kenshin had heard of Danzō's reputation, which had led for him to invite Danzō to his prime castle. Kenshin decided to test Danzō's abilities by challenging him to sneak into a certain castle and to retrieve a prized naginata (a sword in another version of this story) from one of his retainers, Naoe Kanetsugu. Danzō infiltrated Kanetsugu's heavily guarded castle and not only succeeded in stealing the naginata, but also captured a young servant girl. Kenshin then realized that Danzō would be a very useful ally and took him into his service. However, Kanetsugu plotted to kill Danzō (according to another version it was Kenshin himself who ordered his death, perceiving him to be too skillful and thus dangerous), forcing him to try to defect to Takeda Shingen, Kenshin's rival. Suspecting Danzō to be a double agent, Shingen however ordered him to be killed. Danzō was captured by Takeda's men and executed through decapitation.

== In popular culture ==
Katō Danzō makes a prominent appearance in the manga series Path of the Assassin, where he is known as Kite Katō, a fearsome shugenja and nearly unrivaled shinobi. He also appears in a minor role in the video game Samurai Warriors 2 as a fire ninja bodyguard. In the manga and anime series Naruto, there is a character with the name "Danzō" who leads a secretive covert ops team ROOT and another character called Dan has the surname "Katō".

On October 24, 2014, Makai Syojyo Ken held a professional wrestling event, where several wrestlers performed as historical figures and a wrestler better known as Psycho performed as Katō Danzō.

A female, Karakuri puppet version of Katō Danzō also appears in the mobile game Fate/Grand Order as an Assassin class servant.

In Nioh 2, he appears as a wandering ninja hired by Tokichiro to train the protagonist.
