= Saeko Himuro =

Japanese novelist, essayist, and playwright

Saeko Himuro 氷室 冴子
- Himuro in 1986.
- Born: January 11, 1957; Iwamizawa, Hokkaidō
- Died: June 6, 2008 (aged 51)
- Occupations: Novelist, essayist
- Writing career
- Genres: Romance, coming of age
- Notable work: I Can Hear the Sea

Saeko Himuro (氷室 冴子, Himuro Saeko; January 11, 1957 – June 6, 2008) was a Japanese novelist, essayist, and playwright. During the 1980s and 1990s, she was one of the most popular authors released under Shueisha's Cobalt Bunko imprint. She is best known outside Japan for I Can Hear the Sea, which was adapted into a movie by Studio Ghibli.

== Biography ==
Himuro was born in Iwamizawa, Hokkaidō Prefecture on January 11, 1957.

She died from lung cancer on June 6, 2008, aged 51.

== Works ==
=== Novels ===
All titles published by Shueisha Cobalt imprint unless otherwise noted.

1970s

- Shiroi Shōjotachi (白い少女たち) (1978)
- Sayonara Arurukan (さようならアルルカン) (1979)

1980s

- Clara Hakusho (クララ白書) (1980)
- Clara Hakusho Part II (クララ白書ぱーとII, Kurara Hakusho Pāto Tsū) (1980)
- Koisuru Onnatachi (恋する女たち) (1981)
- Agnes Hakusho (アグネス白書, Agunesu Hakusho) (1981)
- Agnes Hakusho Part II (アグネス白書ぱーとII, Agunesu Hakusho Pāto Tsū) (1981)
- Zakkyo Jidai (雑居時代) (1982)
- The Change! (ざ・ちぇんじ!, Za Chenji!) (1983)

The Change! is a four-volume adaptation of Torikaebaya monogatari, a Heian-era tale.

- Cinderella Meikyū (シンデレラ迷宮, Shinderera Meikyū) (1983)
- Shōjo Shōsetsu Ka wa Shinanai! (少女小説家は死なない！) (1983)
- Cinderella Mystery (シンデレラ ミステリー, Shinderera Misuterī) (1984)
- Nagisa Boy (なぎさボーイ, Nagisa Bōi) (1984)
- Nante Suteki ni Japanesque (なんて素敵にジャパネスク, Nante Suteki ni Japanesuku) (1984)
- Warabigaoka Monogatari (蕨ヶ丘物語) (1984)
- Nante Suteki ni Japanesque 2 (なんて素敵にジャパネスク2, Nante Suteki ni Japanesuku Tsū) (1985)
- Japanesque Encore! (ジャパネスク・アンコール!, Japanesuku Ankōru!) (1985)
- Taeko Girl (多恵子ガール, Taeko Gāru) (1985)
- Shoku Japanesque Encore! (続ジャパネスク・アンコール!, Shoku Japanesuku Ankōru!) (1986)
- Yamato Takeru (ヤマトタケル) (1986)
- Nante Suteki ni Japanesque 3 Hitozuma Hen (なんて素敵にジャパネスク3人妻編) (1988)
- Kitasato Madonna (北里マドンナ) (1988)
- Fuyu no Dean, Natsu no Natalie 1 (冬のディーン 夏のナタリー1, Fuyu no Dīn Natsu no Natarī Wan) (1988)
- Nante Suteki ni Japanesque 4 Furin Hen (なんて素敵にジャパネスク4不倫編) (1989)
- Fuyu no Dean, Natsu no Natalie 2 (冬のディーン 夏のナタリー2, Fuyu no Dīn Natsu no Natarī Tsū) (1989)
- Searching for Lady Anne (レディ・アンをさがして, Redi An o Sagashite) (1989, Kadokawa Shoten)
- Ao no Meikyū Jō (碧(あお)の迷宮 上) (1989, Kadokawa Shoten)

1990s

- Nante Suteki ni Japanesque 5 Inbō Hen (なんて素敵にジャパネスク5陰謀編) (1990)
- Nante Suteki ni Japanesque 6 Kōkyū Hen (なんて素敵にジャパネスク6後宮編) (1990)
- Nante Suteki ni Japanesque 7 Gyakushū Hen (なんて素敵にジャパネスク7逆襲編) (1991)
- Nante Suteki ni Japanesque 8 Enjō Hen (なんて素敵にジャパネスク8炎上編) (1991)
- Imōto Monogatari (いもうと物語) (1991, Shinchosha Nochi Bunko)
- Turn—Sanbanme ni Suki (ターン—三番目に好き) (1991, Shueisha Nochi Bunko)
- Gin no Umi, Kin no Daichi (銀の海 金の大地) vol.1-11 (1992–1996)
- Fuyu no Dean, Natsu no Natalie 3 (冬のディーン 夏のナタリー3, Fuyu no Dīn Natsu no Natarī Surī) (1993)
- I Can Hear the Sea (海がきこえる, Umi ga Kikoeru) (1993)
- I Can Hear the Sea II: Because There Is Love (海がきこえるII～アイがあるから～, Umi ga Kikoeru Tsū: Ai ga Aru kara) (1995)

=== Essays ===
- Saeko no Tokyo Monogatari (冴子の東京物語) (1987, Shueisha, Nochi Bunko)
- Playback e Yōkoso (プレイバックへようこそ, Pureibakku e Yōkoso) (1989, Kadokawa Shoten, Nochi Bunko)
- Playback e Yōkoso 2 (プレイバックへようこそ2, Pureibakku e Yōkoso Tsū) (1990, Kadokawa Shoten, Nochi Bunko)
- Girlfriends: Saeko Special (ガールフレンズ－冴子スペシャル, Gārufurenzu—Saeko Supesharu) (1990, Shueisha Cobalt)
- My Dear: Shin'ainaru Monogatari (マイ・ディア—親愛なる物語, Mai Dia: Shin'ainaru Monogatari) (1990, Kadokawa Shoten)
- Ippashi no Onna (いっぱしの女) (1992, Chikuma Shobō, Nochi Bunko)
- Saeko no Haha Kogusa (冴子の母娘草) (1993, Shueisha, Nochi Bunko)
- Hon no Shiawase (ホンの幸せ) (1995, Shueisha, Nochi Bunko)

=== Translation ===
- Ochikubo Monogatari (1993, Kodansha)

=== Collaboration ===
- Boku ga Suki na Hito e (1993, with Katsuya Kondō, based on I Can Hear the Sea)

=== Play ===
- Searching for Lady Anne

=== Works made into television dramas ===
- Nante Suteki ni Japanesque (1986, starring Yasuko Tomita)
- I Can Hear the Sea II: Because There Is Love (1995, starring Shinji Takeda and Hitomi Satō)

=== Work made into radio drama ===
- Nante Suteki ni Japanesque (NHK-FM, starring Satomi Kobayashi)

=== Works made into films ===
- Clara Hakusho (1985, starring Shōjotai)
- Koisuru Onnatachi (1986, starring Yuki Saito)

=== Work made into anime ===
- I Can Hear the Sea (1993, made by Studio Ghibli)

=== Manga ===
These manga were either written by Himuro or the original story idea was created by her.

- Rasen Kaidan o Nobotte (螺旋階段をのぼって) (Shogakukan, drawn by Yumi Kagawa)
- Rising! (ライジング!) (Shogakukan, drawn by Kazuko Fujita)
- Love Quartet (ラブ・カルテット, Rabu Karutetto) (Shueisha, drawn by Hiromi Tanigawa)

=== Works made into manga ===
- Clara Hakusho (Shogakukan, Noa Misaki)
- Agnes Hakusho (Shogakukan, Noa Misaki)
- Nante Suteki ni Japanesque (Hakusensha, Naomi Yamauchi)
- Zakkyo Jidai (Hakusensha, Naomi Yamauchi)
- Warabigaoka Monogatari (Hakusensha, Naomi Yamauchi)
- The Change! (Hakusensha, Naomi Yamauchi)
- Shōjo Shōsetsu Ie wa Shinanai! (Hakusensha, Miyuki Nishizawa)
- Koisuru Onnatachi (Shueisha, Miyoko Nanbu)

=== Work made into picture book ===
- Cinderella Mystery (Tokuma Shoten, artist: Mutsumi Inomata)

=== Works made into plays ===
- Searching for Lady Anne
  - OSK Nippon Kagekidan produced this play in 1996. Michiru Kō starred in the debut performance at the Kintetsu Theatre.
  - Ralph Becker: Michiru Kō
  - Lady Anne: Mebae Kojō
- The Change!
  - Theatre Echo produced this play from 2000-11-12 to 2000-11-21 at the Shinjuku Minamiguchi Kinokuniya Southern Theatre.
    - Produced by Haruhiko Jō
    - Script by Michihiro Ōtani
  - The female musical theater group Gekidan Star of Dreams production ran during September 2005 to celebrate the 15th anniversary of the Morinomiya Planet Station.
    - Produced by Kaori Ōra
- Cinderella Mystery
  - Produced by Theatre Company Caramelbox in 1994 at the Tokyo Geijutsu Geijō Little Hall and Shinbashi Yakult Hall.
  - Produced by Ryūnosuke Kuse
  - Script by Yutaka Narui
