= Kagerō Nikki =

Japanese literary work

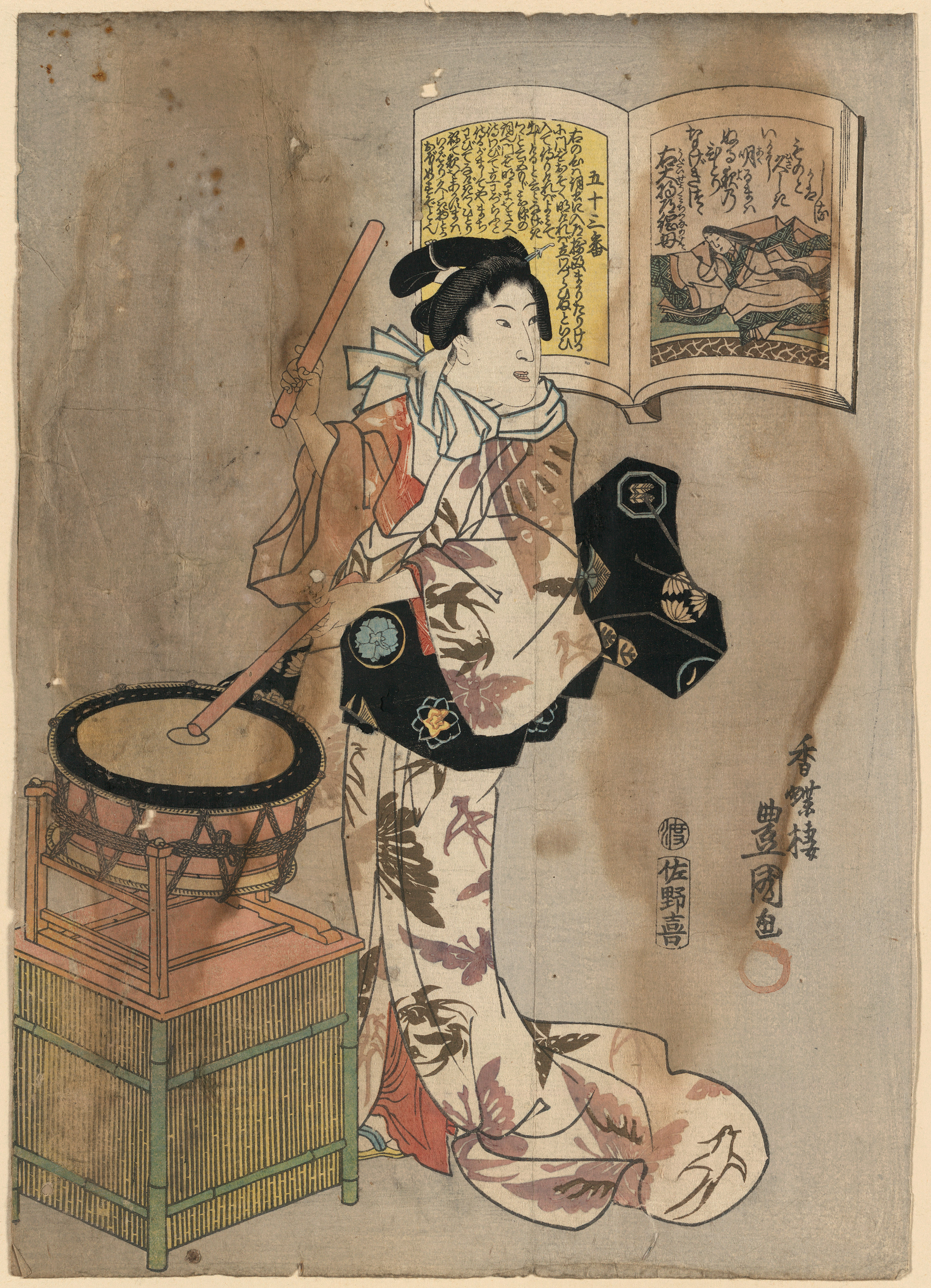
Mother of Michitsuna, author of Kagerō Nikki

Kagerō Nikki (蜻蛉日記; The Mayfly Diary, commonly referred to as The Gossamer Years) is a work of classical Japanese literature, written around 974, that falls under the genre of nikki bungaku, or diary literature. The author of Kagerō Nikki was a woman known only as the Mother of Michitsuna. Using a combination of waka poems and prose, she conveys the life of a noblewoman during the Heian period.

In English Kagerō Nikki is often called The Gossamer Years, which is the title given to the first English translation by Edward Seidensticker. The term kagerō has three possible meanings: it may mean a mayfly; a heat wave; or a thin film of cobweb, which is the meaning proposed by the English Orientalist Arthur Waley.

== Origin ==
During the Heian Period, prominent families often collected and compiled their poems in a family collection, or kashū. It is likely that Fujiwara no Kaneie, her husband, asked the Mother of Michitsuna to create such a collection for their family. However, because she decided to add her own experiences along with the poems that she and Kaneie exchanged, Kagerō Nikki emerged. From the outset, the Mother of Michitsuna reveals her concerns by exploring the reality of her condition. It is commonly believed that Michitsuna’s Mother began writing the work in around 971, when she was facing one of her marriage crises.

== Story ==
Sonja Arntzen argued that the work also functions as a record of the death of Michitsuna’s Mother’s marriage and her struggle to find a reason for living. Kagerō Nikki unfolds around the principal relationship between Michitsuna’s Mother and her husband, Fujiwara no Kaneie, while also placing a hefty emphasis on the author’s other social relationships, such that between herself, her son, and later on her adopted daughter. The diary entries detail events of particular emotional significance, such as when Kaneie visits other women while she stays at home taking care of their son ("the boy"). The Mother of Michitsuna's deep feelings for Kaneie are apparent in the way her words take on a tone of inner anguish as Kaneie's visits dwindle.

In an attempt to find solace, the Mother of Michitsuna makes pilgrimages to temples and mountains of religious importance. She often expresses her desire to become a nun, but the effect that act would have on her son’s future plagues her mind and prevents her from ever taking Buddhist vows. Towards the end of the diary, she finally reconciles herself to her separation from Kaneie, and determines to devote herself to caring for her son and her adopted daughter.

The story ends with Michitsuna’s mother watching the festival of the souls’ return in the new year, and she hears a knock on her door during the late night. The visitor’s identity is never disclosed in the work.

== Style ==
Kagerō Nikki is said to be a diary, but it is "written in a mixture of styles; the first half characterized more by memoir, the latter half by day-to-day entry." The amount of time that passes between events is sometimes weeks or months.

The Mother of Michitsuna is credited with creating "a new form of self-expression and psychological exploration that expanded the potential of kana prose writing and influenced subsequent woman's writing, including The Tale of Genji." She achieves this raw, intimate expression by exploiting the first-person point of view allowed by the diary genre. Edward Seidensticker characterized the diary as “a remarkably frank personal confession” that describes “a disturbed state of mind.” Donald Keene has described Kagerō Nikki as “a self-portrait devastating in its honesty,” one “written passionately and without a thought to how readers might judge her actions.”

Another characteristic of the work is the unique way in which the author labels people in her life. For example, in one entry she writes "that 'splendid' personage of Machi Alley" when referring to the woman with whom Kaneie is having an affair. The sarcastic tone reflects the author’s attitude to the person in question: "This method of labeling people shows how very egocentric she was in her dealings with others, defining them solely in relationship to herself."

On the other hand, Sonja Arntzen argued in her 1997 translation that Michitsuna’s Mother “contributed a realistic mode of writing to Japanese prose” and highlights the psychological sophistication shown in Kagerō Nikki that recognizes the mutability of mental states and memories. Arntzen also praised Kagerō Nikki for its “awareness of the fictiveness of her [Michitsuna’s Mother] telling” and described the style of the work as resembling a “stream of consciousness”.

== Marriage customs ==
Kagerō Nikki is the first piece of literature in which Heian social relations and customs are clearly drawn out. The marriage customs in Japan at the time revolved around the idea of "duolocal residence", in which the husband lived in a separate house while the wife stayed at her parents’ residence. Although there was not a structured procedure for divorce, the stoppage of visits signaled the end of a relationship. In expressing her frustration with this system, the Mother of Michitsuna provides valuable insight into the life of married couples during the Heian period. There was also no taboo against the marriage of an uncle with a niece, as seen in the proposed marriage of Tōnori ("the Kami") to Kaneie's daughter (the author's brother-in-law desiring to marry her adopted daughter).

== Author ==
=== Life ===
Born in 935 as the daughter of a provincial governor, Fujiwara no Tomoyasu, the Mother of Michitsuna was a lower- to mid-level member of the aristocratic class. In 954, at the age of nineteen, she married Fujiwara no Kaneie (929-990), who had recently attained the position of captain of the Right Guards. Kaneie later became the Minister of the Right and Regent after his daughter gave birth to Emperor En'yū's son. Although Kaneie continued to climb the social hierarchy, the Mother of Michitsuna’s position as a secondary wife and mother of only one child left her in an unstable social position. Her tenuous relations with Kaneie drove her to consider becoming a nun, but her son and others in her family convinced her to remain in the secular world. She later adopted a daughter of Kaneie's by another woman. Not long after that, the Mother of Michitsuna's sixteen-year-long marriage came to an end. According to her diary, the Mother of Michitsuna devoted her life to her children, and Michitsuna later was able to attain the position of Major Counselor.

=== Poems ===
The Mother of Michitsuna was known for her skill in waka, classical thirty-one-syllable poems, as indicated by the inclusion of some of her poems in Fujiwara no Teika's anthology Ogura Hyakunin Isshu (or One Hundred Poets, One Hundred Poems, c. 1235) and in the third imperial waka anthology Shūi Wakashū. With her expertise on waka, Michitsuna’s Mother composed poems that facilitated social relationships and also put a stop to others. Besides making compositions using her own name, she also wrote poems on behalf of her husband and her son in order to help them advance in social hierarchy and engage in courtship, demonstrating her artistic talent as a skilled poet.

In Book 3 of Kagerō Nikki, Michitsuna asks his mother to create poems that can help him court the woman that he was trying to pursue. Another instance was when Michitsuna’s Mother passed on her knowledge of literary excellence by teaching her adopted daughter calligraphy and waka. In addition, to reject the advances of an older man who was trying to court her daughter, the author also produced poems in response to his courtship.

=== Marriage Politics ===
Michitsuna’s Mother lived during the age of monogatari, or “tale” or “romance” literature. While this is so, the author depicts her life story as one that does not have its own happy ending. Instead, she writes about the realities of marriage during her time—one that is driven by politics.

While both sons and daughters are important to marriage politics, women are regarded as having a more crucial role to this system as they are regarded as the bearers of the next generation. This is the reason why Michitsuna’s mother bemoaned having a son instead of a daughter in Book 3.

=== Legacy ===
In a society in which kana writing was considered a women's activity, inferior to the Chinese writing of educated men, Heian women produced what are today known as some of the most enduring and classical works in Japanese literature. The Mother of Michitsuna speculated that her work would be as ephemeral as "the diary of a mayfly or the shimmering heat on a summer's day," yet she played a crucial role in this legacy.

In modern times, Kagerō Nikki is often considered by the academia as the first autobiography written by a woman. Despite Michitsuna’s Mother’s portrayal of herself as someone who is ordinary and has little significance, the impact that her work has on Japanese literature would disagree with her sentiment.

== See also ==
- Heian literature
- List of Japanese classical texts

== Bibliography ==
- Shirane, Haruo, ed. Traditional Japanese Literature: An Anthology, Beginnings to 1600. New York: Columbia UP, 2007, ISBN 9780231136976.
- Watanabe, Minoru; Richard Bowring. "Style and Point of View in the Kagero Nikki."Journal of Japanese Studies, Vol. 10, No.2. (Summer, 1984), pp. 365–384. JSTOR 132143.
- McCullough, William H."Japanese Marriage Institutions in the Heian Period".Harvard Journal of Asiatic Studies, Vol.27 (1967), pp. 103–167. JSTOR 2718385.
- "Fujiwara no Kaneie." Kodansha Encyclopedia of Japan. Online ed. 1993.
- Arntzen, Sonja. The Kagerō Diary: A Woman’s Autobiographical Text from Tenth-Century Japan. University of Michigan Press. 2020. doi:10.1353/book.77824.
- Akiyama, Ken. “Ōchō Joryū Bungaku no Sekai”. Tokyo: Tokyo Daigaku Shuppankai, pp. 209. 1972.
- Pigeot, Jacqueline. “From the Kagerō no Nikki to the Genji Monogatari”. Cipango- French Journal of Japanese Studies [Online], Vol. 3. 2014. https://doi.org/10.4000/cjs.687
