= Ocean Waves =

1993 Japanese animated film

- Release poster

海がきこえる (Umi ga Kikoeru)
- Genre: Romantic drama; Coming-of-age
- Serial novel
- Written by: Saeko Himuro
- Illustrated by: Katsuya Kondō
- Published by: Tokuma Shoten
- Magazine: Animage
- Original run: February 1990 – January 1992
- Anime television film
- Directed by: Tomomi Mochizuki
- Produced by: Nozomu Takahashi; Toshio Suzuki; Seiji Okuda
- Written by: Keiko Niwa (as Kaoru Nakamura)
- Music by: Shigeru Nagata
- Studio: Studio Ghibli
- Licensed by: AUS: Madman Entertainment; NA: GKIDS; UK: StudioCanal UK
- Original network: Nippon TV
- Released: May 5, 1993
- Runtime: 72 minutes
- Novel

I Can Hear the Sea II: Because There Is Love
- Written by: Saeko Himuro
- Illustrated by: Katsuya Kondō
- Published by: Tokuma Shoten
- Published: May 31, 1995
- Television drama
- Directed by: Masahiro Nakano
- Produced by: Tetsuya Kuroda (TV Asahi), Masayuki Morikawa (Horipro)
- Written by: Yoshikazu Okada
- Music by: Toru Hasebe
- Studio: TV Asahi
- Original network: TV Asahi
- Original run: December 25, 1995
- icon

Ocean Waves, known in Japan as I Can Hear the Sea, (Note: Japanese: 海がきこえる, Hepburn: Umi ga Kikoeru) is a 1993 Japanese anime coming-of-age romantic drama television film directed by Tomomi Mochizuki and written by Keiko Niwa (credited as Kaoru Nakamura) based on the 1990–1992 novel of the same name by Saeko Himuro. Animated by Studio Ghibli for Tokuma Shoten and the Nippon Television Network, Ocean Waves first aired on May 5, 1993, on Nippon TV. The film is set in the city of Kōchi, and follows a love triangle that develops between two good friends and a new girl who transfers to their high school from Tokyo.

Ocean Waves was an attempt by Studio Ghibli to allow their younger staff members to make a film reasonably cheaply. However, it ended up going both over budget and over schedule. In 1995, a sequel to the novel, I Can Hear the Sea II: Because There Is Love, was published. In the same year, a TV drama was produced mainly based on this work starring Shinji Takeda and Hitomi Satō.

== Plot ==
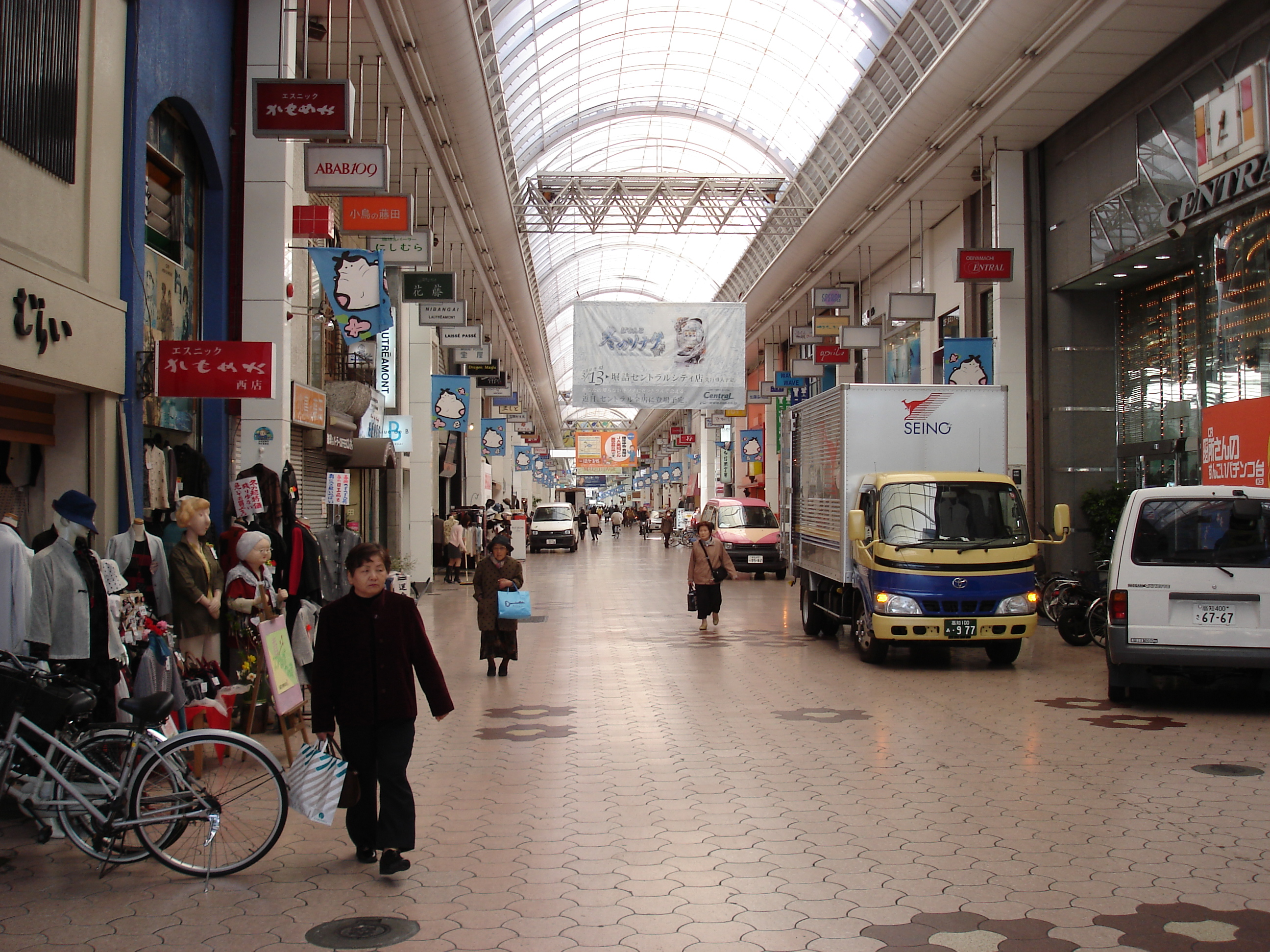
Obiyamachi Shopping Arcade is a frequent film backdrop.

In Kōchi, Taku Morisaki receives a call from his friend, Yutaka Matsuno, asking to meet at their high school. He finds Yutaka with an attractive female transfer student, Rikako Muto, whom Yutaka was asked to show around. Rikako is academically gifted and good at sports, but also arrogant. Taku believes she is unhappy about leaving Tokyo.

On a school trip to Hawaii, Rikako asks Taku to lend her money, as she has lost her own. As Taku has a part-time job, he lends her ¥60,000. Promising to repay him, she warns him not to tell anyone.

Back in Kōchi, the third year begins with Rikako making a friend, Yumi Kohama. Rikako has not returned Taku's money and he wonders if she has forgotten. Out of the blue, a distressed Yumi calls Taku, explaining that Rikako had tricked her into coming to the airport on the pretense of a concert trip, only to discover that their real destination is Tokyo, tickets paid for with Taku's money. He races to the airport and goes to Tokyo with Rikako in place of Yumi.

When Taku and Rikako get to her father's residence, they discover that Rikako's father has already found a new lover. Rikako's father thanks Taku, repays the loan, and arranges a room for him at the Hyatt Regency. Rikako, disappointed in her father, joins him and explains that when her parents were fighting, she had always sided with her father, but had now discovered that he was not on her side. Taku offers his bed and attempts to sleep in the bathtub. The following day, Rikako kicks Taku out so that she can change clothes to meet a friend for lunch. After exploring Tokyo and catching up on sleep at the hotel, Taku receives a call from Rikako asking to be rescued from her former boyfriend, Okada. When he arrives, he becomes angry at the conversation, and chastises Rikako and Okada for being "bores."

Back home, Rikako ignores Taku but tells her friends they spent a night together. Yutaka also tells Taku that he confessed to Rikako but was brutally rejected, prompting Taku to confront Rikako in class. They argue in the corridor, where she responds by slapping him and he hits her in return.

The autumn school cultural festival arrives and Rikako becomes more distant from the other girls, many of whom openly dislike her. Taku sees Rikako defend herself from another student who tries to assault her and comments that he is impressed with the way she handled herself. She slaps him but runs away tearfully with regret. After seeing Rikako crying, Yutaka punches Taku for not standing up for Rikako, calls him an idiot, and walks away. None of the three talks to each other for the rest of the year and all begin attending different universities.

Taku, Yutaka, and Yumi reconnect at a class reunion some years later; Rikako does not attend. While reminiscing about high school, Yutaka comments that he punched Taku because he was angry that Taku had held off on pursuing Rikako due to her mistreatment of Yutaka. He was angry his friend had foregone a beautiful possibility on his account as the two watch the sunset and the ocean waves. After the class reunion party, Taku learns that Rikako was visiting Tokyo instead of being at the reunion to meet "someone who likes to sleep in bathtubs." Later, back in Tokyo, Taku inadvertently has a glimpse of Rikako from across a train platform and runs to meet her. Rikako waits for him instead of boarding the train.

== Cast ==
Character	Voice actor
Taku Morisaki	Nobuo Tobita
Yutaka Matsuno	Toshihiko Seki
Rikako Muto	Yōko Sakamoto
Yumi Kohama	Kae Araki
Akiko Shimizu	Yuri Amano
Okada	Jun'ichi Kanemaru
Tadashi Yamao	Hikaru Midorikawa
Taku's Mother	Ai Satō
Rikako's Father	Kinryū Arimoto
Principal	Takeshi Watabe

== Production ==
The film is based on Himuro's novel which was first serialized, with illustrations by Katsuya Kondō, from the February 1990 to January 1992 issues of Animage magazine. The monthly installments were collected in a hardcover book published on February 28, 1993, with some episodes omitted. Both the book and its sequel were republished as a paperback in 1999, with some pop culture references updated. Kondō served as the character designer and animation director for the adaptation. Production of Ocean Waves was controlled by Studio Ghibli, but much of the animation was produced with the assistance of J.C.Staff, Madhouse Studios, and Oh! Production, who had worked with Ghibli on past projects. This film is the first Ghibli anime directed by someone other than Hayao Miyazaki or Isao Takahata. Tomomi Mochizuki, who was 34 years old at the time, was brought in to direct. The film was an attempt to make anime solely by the young staff members, mostly in their 20s and 30s. Their motto was to produce "quickly, cheaply and with quality", but ultimately it went over budget and over schedule, and Mochizuki claimed he developed a peptic ulcer because of stress.

== Reception ==
The review aggregator website Rotten Tomatoes reports that 89% of critics have given the film a positive review based on 18 reviews, with an average rating of 6.6/10. On another aggregator Metacritic, it has a score of 73 out of 100 based on 4 critic reviews, indicating "generally favorable reviews".

The website Animé Café gave the film 4/5 stars, noting it to be "A graceful and mature offering from Ghibli's younger generation". On the other hand, Otaku USA criticized the film, describing it as Ghibli's "most lackluster film in comparison to everything else they'd done until Tales from Earthsea".

== Release and home media ==
The film premiered on Nippon TV in Japan on May 5, 1993, as part of the network's 40th Anniversary schedules.

=== Japan ===
Japanese DVD cover

Following its initial premiere, the movie was released on VHS and Laserdisc by Tokuma Shoten on June 25, 1993, through the "Animage Video" imprint. Originally, Ocean Waves was not initially part of the Disney-Tokuma deal due to its status as a television movie, but was eventually included as part of an agreement extension and so was re-released on VHS by Buena Vista Home Entertainment Japan on July 23, 1999.

BVHE Japan released the movie on DVD on August 8, 2003. A remastered version was initially released by Disney as part of the "Ghibli ga Ippai Director's Collection" boxset in December 2021 before gaining a standalone release on April 20, 2022.

A Blu-Ray release was released on July 17, 2015, by Walt Disney Studios Japan.

=== Internationally ===
In 2008, distribution company Wild Bunch announced that it had licensed the film to a number of European releasing companies, including Optimum. It was released in the UK under the title Ocean Waves on January 25, 2010 shortly before the planned theatrical release of Ponyo, as part of the Studio Ghibli Collection.

=== United States ===
Disney originally had the rights of distribution of Ocean Waves in United States, but they never released the film onto any home media platform, likely due to its more mature content when compared to most Ghibli movies.

In 2016, GKIDS announced that they would release Ocean Waves in limited North American theaters starting on December 28 of that year and expanding during early 2017. It was later released on US and Canada from January 3, to March 24, 2017. The film earned US$12,039 upon its screenings on December 28, 2016.

The film was released on DVD and Blu-ray by GKIDS under Universal Pictures Home Entertainment on April 18, 2017, with only the Japanese audio with English subtitles. As of December 2022 a dubbed version had not been released, making it the only Ghibli production that is not a short film to not have an English dub.
