= Michitsuna's mother =

Japanese waka poet in the Mid Heian period

Fujiwara no Michitsuna no Haha 藤原道綱母
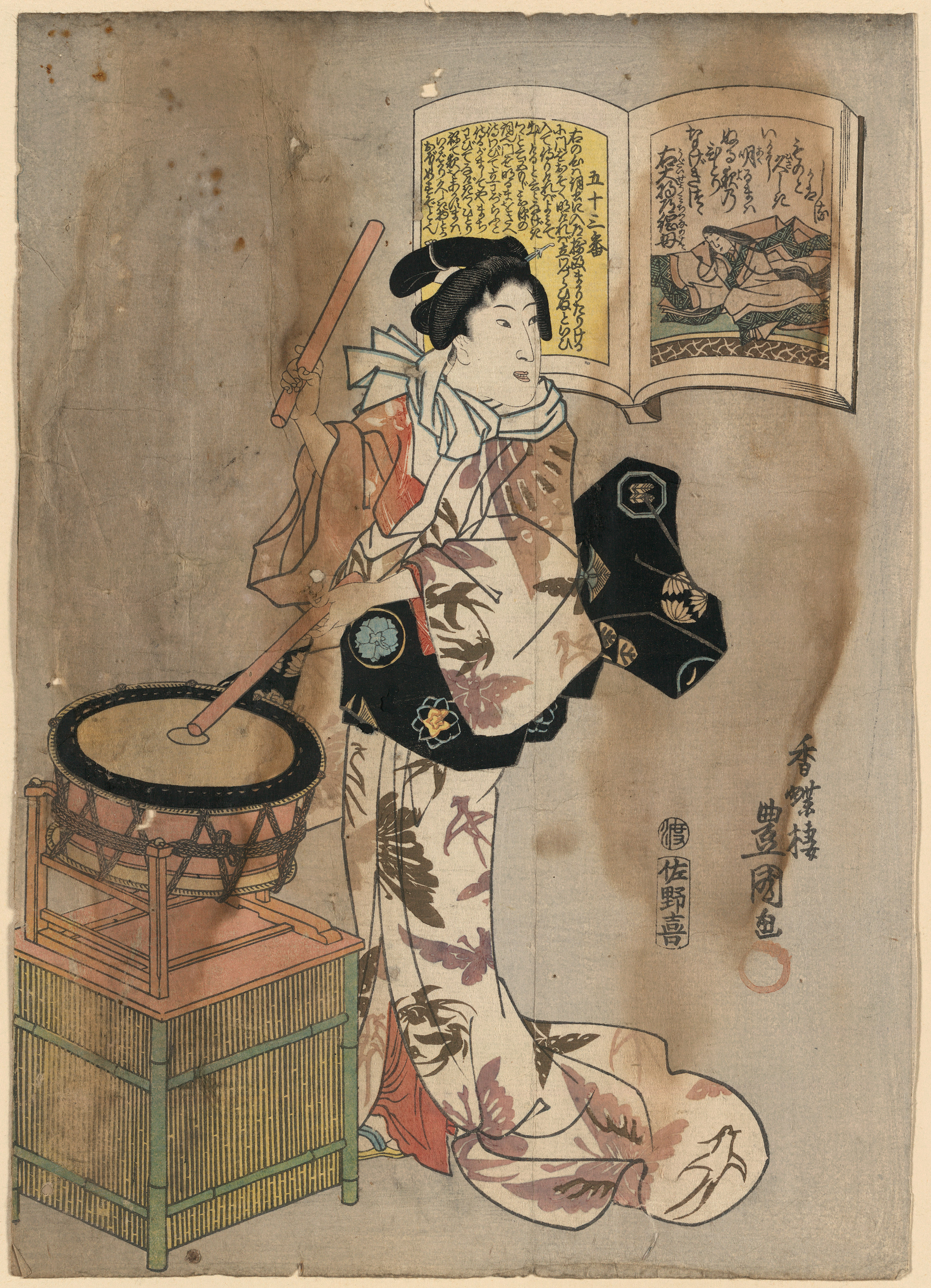
- Fujiwara no Michitsuna no Haha by Ryūryūkyo Shinsai
- Born: 935
- Died: 995
- Parents: Fujiwara no Tomoyasu (father)

Fujiwara no Michitsuna no Haha (藤原道綱母, c. 935–995) was a waka poet in the Mid Heian period. She was in her mid-thirties when she began to write her journal Kagerō Nikki, written in a combination of waka poems and prose. Her diary gave access to a woman's experience of a thousand years ago, with poems she recorded which vividly recall the past. These poems conveyed the life of a noblewoman during the Heian Period. She is one of the Nihon Sandai Bijin (The Three Beauties of Japan). Her true name is unknown to history.

== Name ==
While her true name is unknown to history, she is known by the name "Fujiwara no Michitsuna no Haha," that translates to "Fujiwara clan's Michitsuna's Mother".

== Life ==
She was the daughter of a provincial governor, Fujiwara no Tomoyasu, a member of the middle-ranking aristocracy of the Heian period (794–1185) from which were drawn men who served as provincial governors. Due to her lesser nobility, she became a concubine at the age of nineteen and then married Fujiwara no Kaneie who was later promoted to Sesshō. Michitsuna's Mother was Kaneie's second wife and mother of only one child. Her strained relationship with Kaneie made her consider becoming a nun; however, her son and others in her family persuaded her not to.

== Career ==
Mitchitsuna's Mother was a very influential and highly-regarded poet, being posthumously named a member of both Fujiwara no Norikane's Thirty-six Medieval Poetry Immortals (中古三十六歌仙, Chūko Sanjurokkasen) and the anonymous Thirty-six Female Poetry Immortals (女房三十六歌仙, Nyōbō Sanjūrokkasen). Both are highly prestigious groupings of Japanese poets, serving as sequels to Fujiwara no Kintō's original Thirty-Six Immortals covering the Nara and Early Heian Eras.

Michitsuna's Mother was also credited with expanding the potential of kana prose writing with the creation of a new form of psychological exploration and self-expression, becoming an influence for Lady Murasaki's highly popular Tale of Genji.

She wrote the Kagerō Nikki, a classic of Nikki bungaku; the diary recorded her unhappy marriage to Fujiwara no Kaneie who served as Sesshō and Kampaku. The diary contains an emphasis on Michitsuna's mother's social relationships in particular. An autobiography of 20 years of her life (from 954 to 974), the journal was written in three volumes and further sub-divided by year; nothing is known about her relationship with Kaneie in the last decades of her life.

== Court marriage ==
Heian court marriages were arranged and often polygamous. A man could have several wives, though a woman could have only one husband. A formal ceremony was not required; rather, the details of the marriage were privately agreed upon between the father of the bride and her suitor. Women usually lived apart from their husbands after marriage and raised any heirs of their union. Divorce was common and uncomplicated, requiring nothing more than cessation of marital visits, since the couple were not bound by any legal contract. Both parties were free to remarry afterward. A woman's marriage value depended on the social status of both her father and mother: women of suitable standing were rare and prized.

== Relations ==
- Fujiwara no Tomoyasu (藤原倫寧) (d. 977): Father of Michitsuna's Mother. He was a court official during the mid-Heian Period. He held the title of Shoshiinoge (Senior Fourth Rank, Lower Grade). At the time of Michitsuna's Mother's marriage, he was serving under Kaneie in the Office of the Left Military Guard.
- Fujiwara no Nagato (藤原長能) (949–c. 1009): A waka poet in the mid-Heian period, also known as Fujiwara no Nagayoshi. Younger half-brother of Michitsuna's Mother.
- Fujiwara no Kaneie (藤原兼家) (929–990): Husband of Michitsuna's Mother.
- Michitsuna (道綱) (955–1020) son of Fujiwara no Kaneie and Michitsuna's Mother.

== See also ==
- Waka Poems
- Kagerō Nikki
- Heian literature
