= Fujiwara no Yasunori =

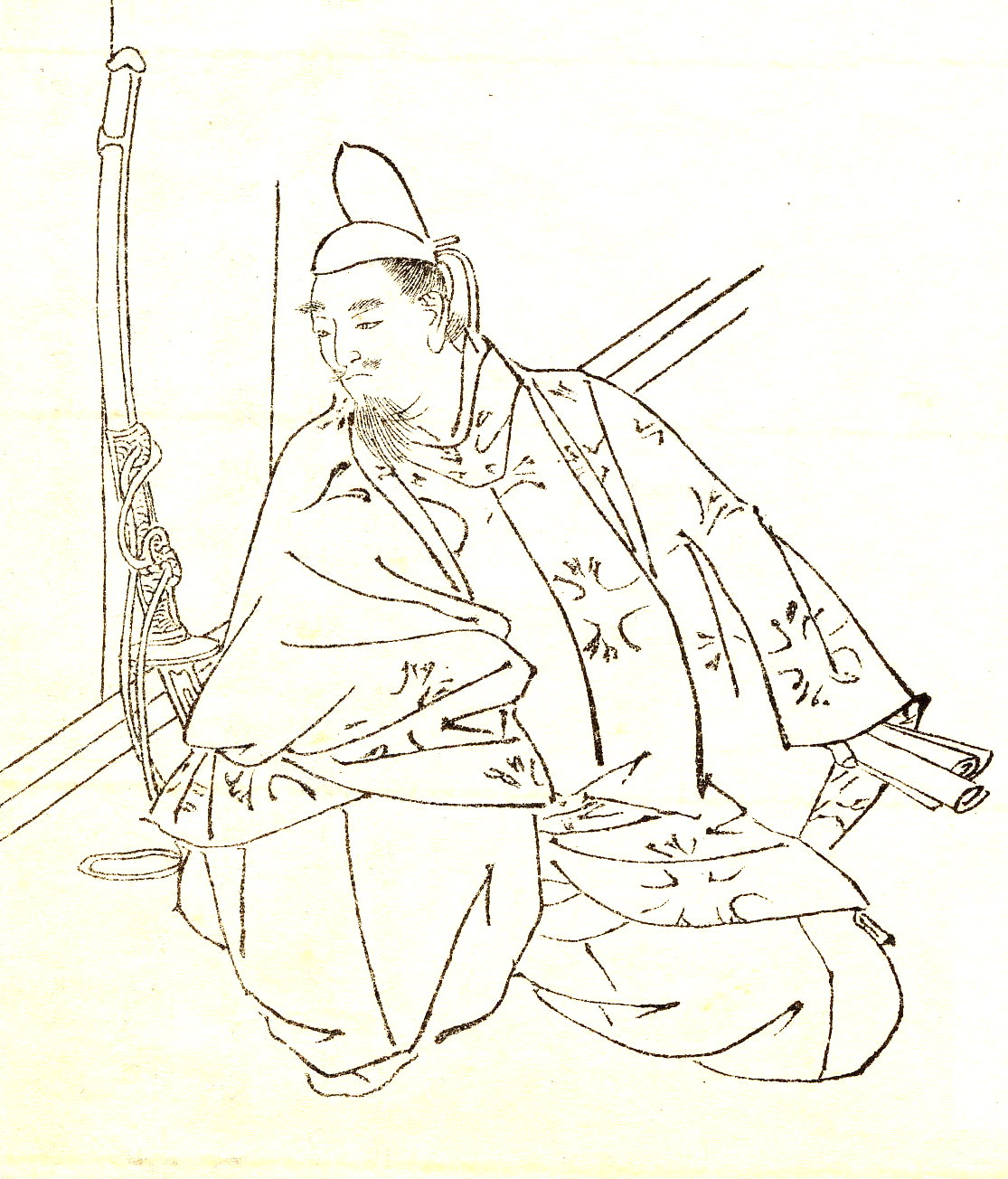
Fujiwara no Yasunori by "Zenken-Kojitsu"

Fujiwara no Yasunori (藤原 保則; 825 – May 23, 895) was a Japanese court noble and an administrator in early Heian Period. His father was Fujiwara no Sadao from South-fujiwara clan. His first son, Fujiwara no Kiyotsura (藤原 清貫), was appointed Dainagon (counsellor).

== Career ==
In 855, Yasunori was appointed Jibu-shō-shō (fourth assistant to the Minister). He held the posts of Minbu-shō-shō (民部少丞), Hyōbu-shō-shō (secondary staff officers), and Shikibu-shō-shō. In 860, he was appointed Hyōbu no dai-jō (兵部大丞).

In 866, Yasunori was appointed Kokushi (official) of Bitchū Province. At the time, this province was beleaguered with water shortages and misgovernment. Yasunori rescued the poor and improved government through a policy promoting agriculture. After that, he left for Bizen Province and enjoyed great popularity because of his competence in government.

In 876, Yasunori returned to Kyoto, and was appointed Emon-no-Suke (The guard of Kyoto), Kebiishi (検非違使, peace maintenance and civil administration of Kyoto), and Minbu-Daiyū (Assistant secretary in the Ministry of Taxation).

In 878, Yasunori was appointed Kokushi of Dewa Province. At the time, Emishi started a rebellion in Dewa Province, and completely defeated the government army. Yasunori was appointed a provincial governor, because he was respected for his governance. After arriving at his new post in Dewa, Yasunori deployed soldiers and supplied the government's reserve supply of rice to the people. When he heard about Yasunori's good government, Emishi gave in without further resistance. The Japanese court ordered Yasunori to suppress the rebellion completely, but he advised the Court that a generous policy was good for Dewa Province. This rebellion, known as Gangyō-Rebellion, ended without the use of force.

Yasunori was appointed Kokushi of Sanuki Province in 882, and appointed Dazai-no-Daini (Assistant secretary of Dazaifu Province). Because Emperor Uda was evaluating Yasunori's abilities, Yasunori returned to Kyoto and was promoted to Minbu-kyō (民部卿, the secretary in Ministry of Taxation) in 891. At the age of seventy, he had a premonition that death was near. He went to Mountain Hiei, and died while chanting the nembutsu.

== Evaluation by historians ==
A 9th century scholar, Miyoshi Kiyotsura, wrote a biography of Yasunori. In the Late Edo period, Saitō Chikudō opined that Yasunori was equal to Nakatomi no kamatari in politics; was as intellectual a person as Miyoshi Kiyotsura; and was a person of as high a caliber as Sugawara no Michizane. Unfortunately Yasunori did not meet an Emperor who could make him a statesman in the central government, so he could show his prowess only in local politics.
