= Shunki =

- Gender: Male

Origin
- Origin: Japanese
- Meaning: Different meanings depending on the kanji used

Shunki (written: 峻希 or 俊希) is a masculine Japanese given name. Notable people with the name include:

- Shunki Higashi (東 俊希; born 2000), Japanese footballer
- Shunki Takahashi (高橋 峻希; born 1990), Japanese footballer
