= Saitō Chikudō =

Japanese Confucian scholar, historian, and poet

Saitō Chikudō (斉藤 竹堂, November 11, 1815 – April 11, 1852) was a Japanese Confucian scholar, historian, and poet. His real name was Kaoru (馨). His pen name was Chikudō (竹堂) or Bōyōshi (茫洋子).

== Life ==
Chikudō was born in Mutsukoku-Tōdagun-Numabemura (now Tajiri in Tōda District, Miyagi prefecture). He studied under Ōtsuki Heisen and Masujima Ran-en. Chikudō entered Yushima Seidō. where he studied and taught Chinese poetry, and served as the house master in Yushima Seidō. He associated with celebrities, including Ōtsuki Bankei, Hagura Kandō, Saitō Totsudō and Shinozaki Shōchiku. Rai Mikisaburō was Chikudō's junior in Yushima Seidō and a friend of his.

== Works ==
Chikudō wrote most of his poems and prose in Classical Chinese. His interests were very wide: he knew the history of Western countries and used Noah, the history of Babylonia, Alexander the Great, Aristotle, Napoleon and George Washington as poem themes.

=== Bibliography ===
- "Hanso jitsuroku" (藩祖実録) – biography of Date Masamune
- "Jin chū roku" (尽忠録) – biography of Date Aki(伊達安芸),Lord of Wakuya Domain
- "Ōshū Kyūji" (奥州旧事) – history of the Tōhoku region
- "Tokushi Zeigi" (読史贅議) – analysis of Japanese historic persons
- "Syun-syun Den" (蠢々伝)
- "Ahen Shimatsu" (鴉片始末) – report on the First Opium War
- "Ban Shi" (蕃史) – history of Western countries
