= Nioh 2 =

2020 video game

- Developers: Team Ninja; Kou Shibusawa
- Publisher: Koei Tecmo: WW: Sony Interactive Entertainment (PS4, PS5)
- Director: Fumihiko Yasuda
- Producer: Fumihiko Yasuda
- Designer: Takahiro Shiojima
- Programmers: Yuta Yamazaki; Takahiro Suzuki
- Writer: Ryohei Hayashi
- Composers: Yugo Kanno; Akihiro Manabe
- Platforms: PlayStation 4; PlayStation 5; Windows
- Release: PlayStation 4: JP: March 12, 2020; WW: March 13, 2020; PlayStation 5, Windows: WW: February 5, 2021
- Genres: Action role-playing, hack and slash
- Modes: Single-player, multiplayer

Nioh 2 (Note: 仁王2, Niō Tsū) is a 2020 action role-playing game developed by Team Ninja and Kou Shibusawa and published by Koei Tecmo for the PlayStation 4. It was released by Sony Interactive Entertainment outside Japan on PlayStation consoles. It is a prequel to Nioh (2017). Versions for PlayStation 5 and Windows titled Nioh 2: Complete Edition, featuring all previous downloadable content, were released on February 5, 2021. The game received generally positive reviews from critics and sold 2.5 million units by February 2022. A sequel, Nioh 3, was released on February 6, 2026.

== Gameplay ==
Similar to its predecessor, Nioh 2 is an action role-playing game. Players can create their own playable character, who is a hybrid born of a yōkai mother and a human father, granting the protagonist many abilities related to yōkai adapted from traditional Japanese folklore. Players are equipped with a variety of weapons such as odachi and kusarigama, and earn new skills and special abilities as they progress in the game. When players defeat a hostile yōkai, some of them may drop a "Soul Core". Soul Cores allow players to use yōkai abilities once the cores are purified by visiting a shrine.

At locations named "Benevolent Graves", players can summon other players, controlled by artificial intelligence, to assist them in combat. The game also features a three-player cooperative multiplayer mode.

== Synopsis ==
=== Setting and characters ===
Set in Japan during the late 1500s, most of Nioh 2 storyline chapters are a prequel to Nioh, while the end chapters of the story take place after the first game's last storyline following the Siege of Osaka. Players take the role of a character named Hidechiyo (秀千代, Hidechiyo), a half-yōkai referred to as a "Shiftling" whose appearance and gender is decided by the player. Hidechiyo's journey through the Sengoku Era begins when they befriend Tōkichirō, an ambitious merchant seeking out Amrita, and Mumyo (無明, Mumyō), a demon hunter of the Sohaya group, eventually playing a critical role in the rise and fall of the warlord Toyotomi Hideyoshi. Kashin Koji serves as the main antagonist, a mysterious entity linked to a powerful yōkai known as Otakemaru, who obstructs Hidechiyo's progress at every turn and is responsible for manipulating many of the events that take place through the game. One key item featured in the game is the Seven-Branched Sword, here known as the Sohayamaru, the sword used to slay Otakemaru in the past and the namesake of the Sohaya.

During their journey, Hidechiyo encounters and serves with several historical characters such as Saitō Dōsan, Takenaka Hanbei, Hachisuka Koroku, Oda Nobunaga and his wife Nōhime, Oda's sister Oichi, Akechi Mitsuhide, Shibata Katsuie, Saitō Toshimitsu (father of Fuku from the first game), Maeda Toshiie and his nephew Keiji. Hide also encounters and fights against Imagawa Yoshimoto, Saitō Yoshitatsu, Magara Naotaka and Nagamasa Azai. Returning historical characters from the first game includes Tokugawa Ieyasu, Tadakatsu Honda, Saika Magoichi and Oda's African retainer Yasuke. Other historical figures such as the Heian period onmyōji Abe no Seimei, tea master Sen no Rikyū, Katō Danzō and Okuni also appear to aid Hide in their adventures. Nioh's protagonist William returns near the end portion of the game which takes place after the events of the first, still in pursuit of Maria, with Hattori Hanzō making a cameo appearance: The Hanzō encountered by players here is his father Masanari.

Nioh 2 received three downloadable contents following its release, each DLC taking place post-game where Hide is sent back in time to the Heian period to solve the mystery of the Sohayamaru's origins and Otakemaru's hatred towards humanity. The first, "The Tengu's Disciple", takes Hide to the end of the Genpei War where they encounter Minamoto no Yoshitsune and his ally Benkei. The second DLC, "Darkness in the Capital", has Hide allying with Abe no Seimei, legendary demon slayer Minamoto no Yorimitsu and her Shitennō against Ashiya Dōman's plots. The last DLC, "The First Samurai", brings Hide into an encounter with Suzuka Gozen, revealing the truth of their ties with Otakemaru and the Sohayamaru.

=== Main plot ===
The game begins with the Shiftling protagonist, Hide, being awoken from a recurring nightmare and after saving a villager, finds a mysterious letter leading them to Jusanzakura. Clearing the village of both yōkai and bandits, Hide fights the giant Yokai, Mezuki, and succeeds but begins to lose control of their yōkai power until Tokichiro, the sender of the letter, saves them. The two befriend each other and enter the employ of Saitō Dōsan, also meeting the demon hunter, Mumyō along the way, but shortly after, Dosan's successor, Saito Yoshiatsu, rebels. Hide and Tokichiro attempts to save Dosan, but when Dosan realizes that Hide is their child, he sacrifices himself so that they can escape.

Heeding Dosan's last advice, Hide and Tokichiro seek an audience with Oda Nobunaga, who recruits the two companions to his forces, sending them to Okehazama to attack Imagawa Yoshimoto, then to Sunomoto to help Maeda Toshiie, Shibata Katsuie, and Hachisuka Koroku (another Shiftling like Hide) construct a castle there. After meeting Takenaka Hanbei and purifying his Guardian Spirit, Hakutaku, with Spirit Stones, Hide and Tokichiro head to Inabayama Castle, where Hide confronts and slays Saito Yoshitatsu, discovering that Yoshitatsu is Hide's twin. Kashin Koji, the mysterious man from Hide's nightmares, appears from Yoshitatsu's corpse and vanishes. While celebrating the subjugation of Mino, Nobunaga grants Hide and Tokichiro's request to be known by a single name: Hideyoshi. Later, while fleeing Kanegasaki after a battle, Hide saves Mumyō after she was incapacitated by a yōkai, changing Mumyō's attitude towards them and also discovering a resonance between Hide's dagger and Mumyō's talisman. The trio will encounter Kashin Koji again during Nobunaga's war against the Azai and Asakura clans when they infiltrated Odani castle to protect Nobunaga's sister, Lady Oichi, with Kashin Koji having possessed Azai Nagamasa. Kashin Koji leaves Nagamasa's body after he was cut down and issues a warning to Tokichiro regarding his dreams and the Spirit Stones before disappearing.

During the attack on Ishiyama Honganji, Hanbei's illness gets worse and he passes away on the battlefield. Meanwhile, Tokichiro is approached by Saito Toshimitsu, now possessed by Kashin Koji, who manipulates Tokichiro and Akechi Mitsuhide into betraying Nobunaga, resulting in the Honnō-ji Incident where both Nobunaga and his wife Nōhime perish. Toshimitsu then betrays Mitsuhide at the Battle of Yamazaki, transforming into the yōkai Ryomen Sukuna, but is then defeated by an arriving Hide. Kashin Koji leaves Toshimitsu's body, who realizes what has happened and urges Hide to protect Mitsuhide as he is killed by Tokichiro and his forces. Realizing that Kashin Koji was responsible and has corrupted Tokichiro, Hide is forced to flee alongside Mumyo and Mitsuhide to ally with Tokugawa Ieyasu.

Hide is tasked with rescuing Shibata Katsuie and Oichi at Kitanosho Castle, defeating a conflicted Maeda Toshiie who has allied with Tokichiro, but is then forced to kill Katsuie who had transformed into a yōkai and witnesses Oichi's suicide. After meeting with Mitsuhide's new persona, Tenkai, and the tea master, Sen no Rikyu, Hide heads to the battlefield of Komaki and Nagakute to confront Tokichiro, killing him. This turns out to be part of Kashin Koji's plan as he resurrects and takes over Tokichiro's body, using his powers to turn every yōkai in the area into crazed beasts that attacks both Tokugawa and Hideyoshi forces, with Hide first being forced to cut down a crazed Koroku, then defeating the gigantic Yokai, Daidara Bocchi. Hide is then confronted by the resurrected Tokichiro, who overpowers and kills them with their own dagger.

Hide awakens in The Interim, a gathering place for deceased souls, and is met by Hanbei's spirit who leads them to Hide's mother, Miyoshino, who reveals that Kashin Koji is Otakemaru, a powerful Yokai that was sealed by the Sohayamaru and the one responsible for Miyoshino's death. A resurrected Hide is then sent to Byōdō-in to search for clues about the Sohayamaru, finding the possessed Tokichiro there, who undoes the seals of the two Yokai contained in the temple: the Nine-tailed Fox and Shuten Doji, the latter of which stays behind to fight Hide but is defeated. Hide and Mumyo learn that Sohayamaru can be restored by combining the former's dagger with the latter's sword guard talisman and a large quantity of Spirit Stones. Learning of Tokichiro's large supply of Spirit Stones at Jurakudai, Hide and Mumyo sneak in, where they find a dying Rikyu and are confronted by Lady Osakabe, a gigantic Yokai in the form of a castle whom they defeat, using the Spirit Stones it contained to restore Sohayamaru. They head to Daigoji to confront Tokichiro one last time, with Hide finally freeing Tokichiro from Kashin Koji's influence before he passes away. Koji appears to fight Hide but is defeated, leaving behind one of his horns.

Hide heads to Byōdō-In, using the Sohayamaru on Koji's horn to seal Otakemaru in the temple forever, with Mumyo staying to watch over the comatose Hide. Sometime afterwards, William, the protagonist of Nioh, arrives at Kuroshima in search of Maria, leading him to Byodo-In and inadvertently releasing Kashin Koji, who briefly uses Hide's body to fight William before fleeing. Returning to their senses, Hide reunites with Mumyo and allies with William to stop Maria from resurrecting Tokichiro, believing he will continue to fan the flames of war. Catching Maria off-guard, Koji tries to possess Tokichiro but Hide stops him, forcing him to fight them in a spiritual battle as he transforms into Otakemaru. With help from Tokichiro in the form of his Guardian Spirit, Hide finally vanquishes Otakemaru and, after experiencing a vision of heroes who once wielded Sohayamaru, is reunited with the revived Tokichiro. As William captures Maria and returns to his son and Hattori Hanzo, Hide and Mumyo bid farewell to Tokichiro as his spirit moves on to the afterlife before the two set off to hunt down hostile yōkai that still threaten the land.

=== The Tengu's Disciple ===
While seeking out signs of potential unrest, Hide encounters an ancient shrine that resonates with Sohayamaru and causes the Guardian Spirit, Kurama Tengu, to appear, sending Hide back in time to the Heian period, where they encounter Minamoto no Yoshitsune, the wielder of Sohayamaru at the time. After encountering Benkei and helping Yoshitsune deal with the Taira Clan and the colossal water Yokai, Uminyudo, Yoshitsune recruits Hide to help him in his war against the Taira to restore peace to the land. Hide later meets up with Yoshitsune, who is under attack from Fujiwara troops in Hiraizumi. When they catch up to Benkei, the latter is killed trying to protect his master. Overcome with rage, Yoshitsune transforms into a Yokai, killing the enemy troops before turning on Hide. Hide succeeds in defeating Yoshitsune and restoring his senses, not before experiencing a vision of a woman wielding Sohayamaru. Yoshitsune entrusts Hide with the mission of uncovering the truth behind Sohayamaru's origins, and his flute, with Hide transported back to their time.

=== Darkness in the Capital ===
Continuing Yoshitsune's mission, Hide encounters the Guardian Spirit, Oh, who leads them to an ancient shrine containing a small box, which upon opened, pours out light which resonates with Sohayamaru. Hide is transported back in time to the middle of the Heian period where they encounters Minamoto no Yorimitsu, who attacks Hide thinking they are one of the hostile yōkai currently attacking the city. When Yorimitsu is called upon by her retainer, Sakata no Kintoki, to head to Rashomon Gate, Hide follows them as they encounter and are captured by the spider Yokai, Tsuchigumo. Hide slays it and frees the two, not before encountering Ashiya Doman, the true culprit, and also Abe no Seimei, who recruits Hide to help deal with Doman. At the Imperial Palace, Hide finds Doman, who summons dark spirits to attack them but is stopped by Nekomata, who is transformed by the spirits into the White Tiger, fighting Hide until he's defeated and restored by Seimei. Resuming the pursuit, Hide defeats Doman first in his human form, then once more when the evil onmyōji sacrifices his body to summon the Lightning God of Yomi. A past version of Kashin Koji, who was slain by Hide in their time, is revealed to have been possessing Doman the entire time as he emerges from the latter's corpse and vanishes. At Byōdō-In, Seimei and Yorimitsu sacrifice themselves to seal the Nine-tailed Fox and Shuten Doji, but not before Yorimitsu shares with Hide her Guardian Spirit, Oh, and urges them to solve the mystery of the young demon slayer, with Hide returning to their time and restoring Yorimitsu's box to the ancient shrine.

=== The First Samurai ===
In a deserted village near the Suzuka Pass, Hide finds another ancient shrine where a Guardian Spirit dragon emerges from a pictured scroll inside it, resonating with Sohayamaru and sending Hide back in time to the early days of the Heian period. Hide hears of their mother telling them the story of Otakemaru, a demon once loved by humans but when they grew fearful of Otakemaru and attacked him, he turned on them, laying waste to the entire village until he's confronted by a mysterious woman and her Guardian Spirit dragon. Hide finds Otakemaru and the two fight, with Hide almost losing control and being turned into an Aratama. However, Hide is rescued by Suzuka, Otakemaru's sister. Trusting Hide, Suzuka heads off in pursuit of her brother, encountering Tate Eboshi, a yokai loyal to Otakemaru. Suzuka is knocked out, leaving Hide to fight and slay the yokai. Having run out of options to defeat her brother, Suzuka uses the last of her strength to give Hide her Guardian Spirit, Sohaya, to them and transform her sword with the Spirit Stones Tate Eboshi gathered into Sohayamaru, the process taking a toll on Suzuka by rendering her amnesiac. With the newly created Sohayamaru in their possession, Hide heads to Onigajo to confront Otakemaru, who transforms his Guardian Spirit into an Aratama, fusing with it to become the Nightmare Bringer. Hide vanquishes the Nightmare Bringer, and Otakemaru, realizing that the half-yōkai Hide was proof that his abandoned dream of humans and yōkai being able to live together had come true, is cleansed of all the pain and hatred. As Suzuka arrives, Kashin Koji begins to materialise from Otakemaru's cut off horn, but Hide seals him away with Sohayamaru, this time permanently, before returning to their time. Suzuka would recount these events as a fairy-tale to the child Hide (not knowing that Hide is the hero of the legend). In the afterlife, Otakemaru, now restored to this original appearance, is reunited with Miyoshino, whose memories as Suzuka have returned, and the two pass on together.

== Development and release ==
Nioh 2 was developed by Koei Tecmo divisions Team Ninja and Kou Shibusawa. Fumihiko Yasuda of Team Ninja returned as director after directing its predecessor.

Nioh 2 was announced by Sony Interactive Entertainment for the PlayStation 4 at E3 2018 during their press conference. An open beta of the game began on November 1, 2019. It released on March 13, 2020. Versions for PlayStation 5 and Windows titled Nioh 2 Remastered - Complete Edition and Nioh 2: Complete Edition, respectively, featuring all the previous downloadable content were released on February 5, 2021.

== Reception ==
Reception

Aggregate scores
Aggregator	Score
Metacritic	PS4: 85/100; PC: 86/100; PS5: 83/100
OpenCritic	97% recommend

Review scores
Publication	Score
Destructoid	9/10
Electronic Gaming Monthly	8/10
Game Informer	8.5/10
GameRevolution	4.5/5
GameSpot	8/10
GamesRadar+	4.5/5
IGN	9/10

=== Critical reception ===
Nioh 2 received "generally favorable" reviews from critics, according to review aggregator website Metacritic. Fellow review aggregator OpenCritic assessed that the game received "mighty" approval, being recommended by 97% of critics.

IGN stated, "Nioh 2 is an impressive evolution of its predecessor, strengthening everything that was already great, while mostly leaving its already existing issues alone. Its stellar combat is elevated by the addition of Soul Cores, Burst Counters, and the ways in which those two main new mechanics affect enemy AI and how you approach battles. It's [sic] depth is impressive, even though that can also make it feel a little overwhelming due to how much time must be spent managing Nioh 2's many systems. If you're up to the challenge, Nioh 2 is no doubt one of the most difficult and rewarding games of this generation." While GameSpot stated, "Ultimately, that excruciating difficulty and the feeling it evokes are baked into Nioh's DNA, though, and its boss fights remain compelling even as they vex and frustrate. Though it sometimes feels like a curse as you play, it is a testament that Nioh 2 successfully grabs and holds your complete attention so close for so long."

=== Accolades ===
Nioh 2 has won the Award for Excellence at Japan Game Awards. It was nominated for Best Action Game at The Game Awards 2020, as well as Action Game of the Year at the 24th Annual D.I.C.E. Awards. It also won Best Game You Suck At at The Steam Awards 2021.

Year	Award	Category	Result	Ref.
2020	Japan Game Awards	Award for Excellence	Won	
2020	The Game Awards 2020	Best Action Game	Nominated	
2021	24th Annual D.I.C.E. Awards	Action Game of the Year	Nominated	
2021	The Steam Awards	Best Game You Suck At	Won	

=== Sales ===
Nioh 2 sold 91,892 units during its first week of release in Japan, which made it the bestselling retail game of the week in the country. It was also the best-selling game during its first week of release in the United Kingdom.

By April 2021, the game had sold over 2 million units. By February 2022, the game had sold 2.5 million units. By October 2022, Nioh and Nioh 2 combined had sold over 7 million units. In its FY2024 Financial Results report published in April 2025, Koei Tecmo reported that the Nioh series combined had sold over 7.5 million units. As of May 2025, the Nioh series — including both Nioh and Nioh 2 — has surpassed 8 million units sold worldwide.

== Sequels ==
A third game in the series, Nioh 3, was released on February 6, 2026. A limited-time alpha demo for PlayStation 5 was available from June 4 2025 to June 18 2025.
