= Miyoshi Kiyotsura =

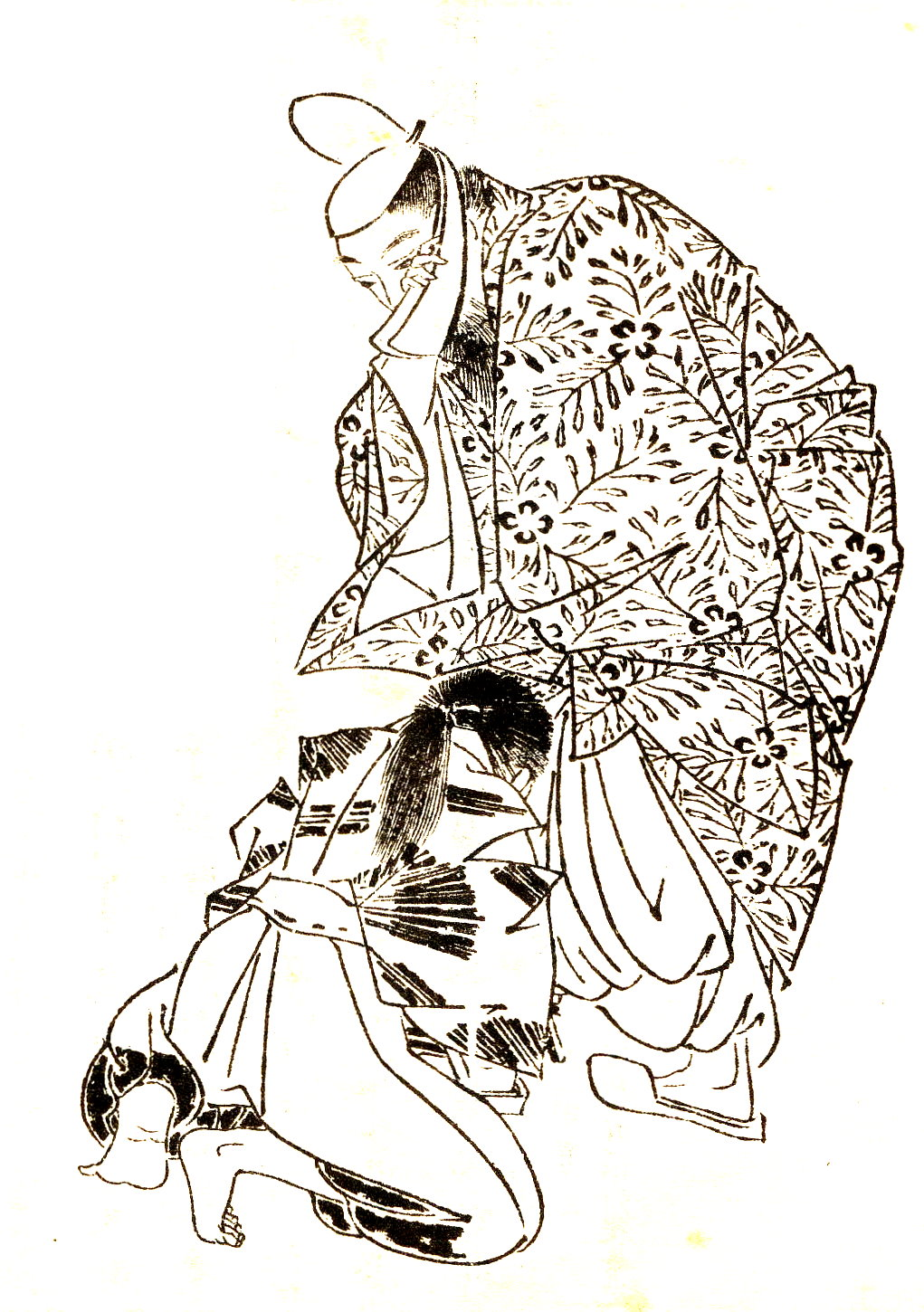
Miyoshi Kiyotsura by "Zenken-Kojitsu"

Miyoshi Kiyotsura (三善 清行, 847 – January 16, 918) was a Japanese Confucian scholar, now most notable for his opprobrium of Buddhism.

== Life ==
Kiyotsura was a scholar and professor of literature, eventually becoming the Daigaku-no-kami and writing a biography of Fujiwara no Yasunori. He also enjoyed a distinguished career in politics, as both a provincial governor and later as the State Chancellor, dying while holding this office.
In 914, Kiyotsura authored the Memorial of Opinion (Iken Fuji), the purpose of which was to make the Emperor Daigo aware of the deterioration of both the morality of the Imperial Court's nobles and of public finances. He principally blamed Buddhism for this decay, though he also condemns Shinto and Court officials. The excessive expenditure of the Court on clothing and banquets was opposed to his own Confucian ideals - he implored Daigo to establish regulations on dress corresponding to Court rank, and enforce decrees through the use of the metropolitan police force.
Kiyotsura also spoke of the decreasing standard of learning; he blamed this upon the Daigaku-ryō's financial disrepair, ascribing blame for this to the loss of rice lands. He paints a bleak picture of students starving, silent lecture halls, and overgrown courtyards. On the other hand, he admits that he is looking at but one aspect of a greater whole, and his condemnation is not entirely balanced or just.
Although Kiyotsura's suggestions were in part adopted - certain dyes' use was only allowed to those of a certain rank - these regulations were ignored.
