= Sumiyoshi Monogatari =

Japanese literary work

Sumiyoshi Monogatari (住吉物語) is a late 10th century Japanese story. Along with Ochikubo Monogatari, it is representative of Japanese Cinderella-type literature dealing with stepmother bullying and harassment. It belongs to the tsukuri monogatari genre.

It was translated into English by Sir Harold George Parlett in volume 29 of Transactions of the Asiatic Society of Japan.

== Composition ==
The author is unknown. Sone no Yoshitada (曽禰好忠) is suggested as a possible candidate. Originally written late in the 10th century, the original text is now lost. It only survives now in a c. 12th century revised edition.

The story was quite influential on Japanese literature. It is referenced in works such as Makura no Sōshi and Genji Monogatari. The Tamakatsura chapter of Genji was written with Sumiyoshi Monogatari in mind. Its popularity is evident in that it inspired more than 120 existing manuscripts. In addition, many later stories, generally of the Otogizōshi genre, dealing with similar motifs are referred to as Sumiyoshi-style.

== Contents ==
The story exists in single and two volume editions. It tells the story of a Middle Chancellor's daughter who runs away from home to escape the bullying from her stepmother.

== Plot ==
Once, a Middle Chancellor has two wives and three daughters. The first wife has a very beautiful daughter named "Himegimi" (Little Princess), while the second wife had two daughters, namely "Naka no Kimi" (Middle Princess), and "San no Kimi" (Third Princess). Himegimi's mother died when she is about eight years old, and her stepmother began to favor her own daughters but ill-treat her stepdaughter.

One spring morning, when the Middle Chancellor's children were around twelve to thirteen years old, a man of important family and with the rank of a Middle Captain saw Himegimi from his chariot and fell in-love with her. She too, falls in love with the Minor Captain and gets engaged. However, her stepmother forces him to marry her real daughter, San no Kimi. The stepmother also obstructs her from serving in the palace or marrying a Left Watch Guard. When the daughter discovers the truth, she runs away from home to Sumiyoshi Shrine, a shrine in the village of Sumiyoshi, a fishing village in Osaka, Japan, to serve as a servant to her dead mother's nurse, who is now a nun.

The Minor Captain is appointed as Major Captain, but his marriage with San no Kimi was an unhappy one. After a series of fasting, he is led to the shrine through a mystical dream. There he found Himegimi, and carried her back to his palace where she truly belongs. They marry, Himegimi reveals herself to her family, and the stepmother and her envious daughters end their lives in poverty and disgrace.

== See also ==
- Ochikubo Monogatari, a similar Cinderella-like story dealing bullying and harassment
