= Kazashi no Himegimi =

Kazashi no Himegimi (かざしの姫君), also known as Kazashi no Hime (かざしの姫), is a Japanese Muromachi period story. It is one volume in length, and the text is accompanied by illustrations. The author is unknown.

The story belongs to the otogizōshi genre and is sub-classified as a kaikondan, a story dealing with marriage between different species, specifically in this story, with the spirit of a chrysanthemum flower, which is rare.

== Story ==
Princess Kazashi is the daughter of the Middle Counselor Minamoto. She loves flowers, and at the age of 14 meets a man named Shōshō in a dream and they exchange marriage vows. He secretly visits the princess each night. One day the father is commanded to present chrysanthemums for a ceremony. That evening, Shōshō appears in a weakened state and tells the princess that it would be his final visit. He leaves a gift and tells her to remember him through their child and leaves. The gift was a poem and a chrysanthemum, and she realizes that he was the spirit of the chrysanthemum flower that her father had plucked. She later gives birth to a daughter, but the princess dies after childbirth. The daughter is raised by the princess' parents, and at the age of 13 becomes a lady of the court. The emperor loves her and she soon gives birth to a son and daughter.

== Manuscripts ==
The text survives in four manuscripts located in:

- National Diet Library
- Keiō University Library
- Harvard University Fogg Art Museum
- Ono Hisashi collection
