= Ochikubo Monogatari =

Japanese fairy tale from the Heian period

Ochikubo Monogatari (落窪物語), also known as The Tale of Ochikubo, is a story from the Heian period which is similar to the famous fairy tale Cinderella.

Ochikubo Monogatari was written during the later part of the 10th century by an unknown author. It is known as the oldest surviving tale in Japanese literature to include harassment and bullying from a stepmother. Ochikubo Monogatari's well-formed plot and vivid description of characters influenced many writers such as Murasaki Shikibu, author of The Tale of Genji. The lively dialogues are also of particular quality.

== Overview ==
The title "Ochikubo" comes from the name of the room in which the protagonist, a miserable lady, lives. The beautiful protagonist, Ochikubo Lady, is forced to live in a shabby hut with a tatami mat in the corner of a shinden-zukuri (chamberlain-style) building, as the name suggests, and is bullied by her stepmother, but in the end she is chosen by a young man from the Konoe-fu (Ukon) and they marry, making this a tale of stepchild bullying with a similar plot to Cinderella.

Ochikubo Monogatari is a Medieval tale that precedes The Tale of Genji, and is also mentioned in The Pillow Book. Although the story has a rather simple plot that clearly separates benevolence and resentment, it is highly regarded as a story that realistically depicts the aristocratic society of the time, centering on the plot of stepchild bullying.

== Plot ==
After suffering from relentless harassment from her stepmother, Princess Ochikubo meets a man named Michiyori who is a general. The two marry and Princess Ochikubo lives very happily with him. Michiyori starts to take revenge on Princess Ochikubo's family, setting up a series of humiliating events.

== Characters ==
=== Chūnagon ===
Is a title for a noble who is Middle Rank and one of the three State Counsellors. His real name is unknown and is only known by his title Chūnagon. He is the father of Lady Ochikubo and is under control of Kita no Kata. He never treated Lady Ochikubo with affection and feels sorry at times towards his daughter for living through the loneliness and without care from family.

=== Kita no Kata ===
Her real name in the story is unknown, only known as according to her title as Kita no Kata. She is the step-mother of Lady Ochikubo and wife of the Chūnagon. She plays as the cruel step-mother who continuously gives trouble and humiliation to her step-daughter. She dislikes Lady Ochikubo and takes all the happiness and luxurious things away from her. Kita no Kata would not address her step-daughter as “princess” or “Lady”, and would rather address her as servant if she could. But due to her concern that the Lord may dislike her upon for calling Lady Ochikubo as servant, she tells everyone in the mansion to title the Lady as “Ochikubo no Kimi”

=== Lady Ochikubo ===
She is the daughter of Chūnagon and step-daughter of Kita no Kata. Her existence in the mansion is unknown to people and receives no care or affection from anyone other than her special attendant named Akogi, also known as Ushiromi. She falls in love later with Michiyori and escapes from the grasp and torture from her step-mother. She is kind hearted but yet a very humble and reserved character where she makes careful moves around the house for the fear that her step-mother will inflict on her even more suffering and humiliation than she already endured. Because her mother was a woman of royal lineage, her origin was much higher than that of her stepmother and half-sisters, but she was treated like a maid by them. For many years, she was forced to sew her family's kimonos and accessories as a seamstress, so she is very good at sewing and the koto, which she learned from her late mother.

=== Akogi (Ushiromi) ===
She is a loyal servant of Lady Ochikubo and has the position as the special attendant in the mansion. She receives much love from the Lady and only wishes to serve under Lady Ochikubo. Akogi—originally named Ushiromi—has sympathy for and understands Lady Ochibuko the most in the mansion and seeks to find the ideal man for the Lady to marry to so she can escape from the loneliness in the house and also from the further cruelty received from Kita no Kata. Her name later got changed to Akogi by the step-mother's order because although the step-mother separated Lady Ochikubo and Akogi, she always sees Akogi's loyalty follow and belong only to the Lady. The name "Ushiromi" means “guardian," symbolic of the fact that Akogi is Lady Ochibuko's guardian angel. The stepmother dislikes that and thinks that it is not an appropriate name, so she changes her name to Akogi.

=== Shinokimi (四の君) ===
She is the youngest daughter born to the Chunagon and Kita no Kata. Kita no Kata tries to marry her to Ukon no Shosho, but Ukon no Shosho tricks her into marrying Hyobu no Shoyu. Later, with Ukon no Shosho's help, she remarries to Dazai no Daini.

== Translations ==
The story was translated into modern Japanese in 1993 by Saeko Himuro.

The story was first translated into English in 1934 by Wilfred Whitehouse. A revised edition credited to Whitehouse and Eizo Yanagisawa was published in 1970.

== See also ==
- Sumiyoshi Monogatari, a similar Cinderella-like story dealing with stepmother bullying.
