= Sangyō Gisho =

The Sangyō Gisho (三経義疏, "Annotated Commentaries on the Three Sutras") is the title of three annotated commentaries on important Buddhist sutras: Hokke Gisho (法華義疏), Shōmangyō Gisho (勝鬘経義疏), and Yuimagyō Gisho (維摩経義疏).

== Hokke Gisho ==
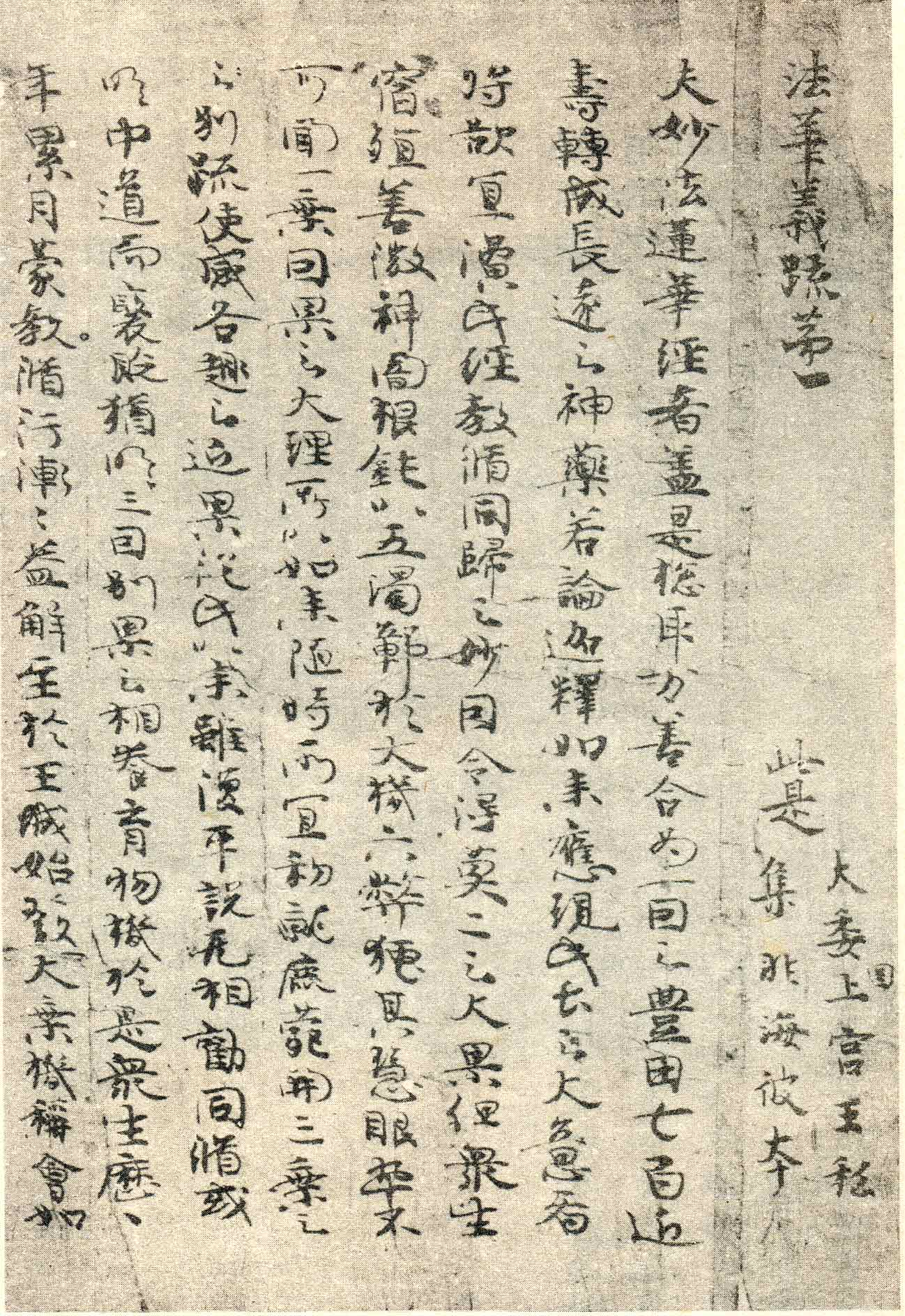
A page of the Hokke Gisho

An annotated commentary on the Lotus Sūtra; four volumes in length. It is based on the annotated text Fa Hua Yi Ji (法華義記) by Liang dynasty monk Fayun (法雲, 467–529 AD). Approximately 70% of the contents are identical.

According to tradition, the Hokke Gisho was composed in 615 AD and is the oldest Japanese text, highly venerated among Tendai scholars but never shared to the public. Legend indicates that the manuscript was discovered by the Buddhist monk Gyōshin (行信), who erected the Hōryū-ji Tō-in Temple where the manuscript was kept for many centuries until 1878, when it was finally presented to the Emperor Meiji as an offertory gift.

== Shōmangyō Gisho ==
An annotated commentary on the Śrīmālādevī Siṃhanāda Sūtra; one volume in length. In the late 1960s, it was discovered that about 80% of this text was copied from a Liang dynasty commentary by the monk Min (旻, 467–527), which was recovered from the Dunhuang manuscripts. Traditionally said to have been completed in 611.

== Yuimagyō Gisho ==
An annotated commentary on the Vimalakirti Sūtra; three volumes in length. It is based on annotated texts of the Liang dynasty monk Zhizang (458–522). Traditionally said to have been completed in 613.

== Issues of authorship ==
Only the Hokke Gisho remains in original manuscript form, while the Shōmangyō Gisho and Yuimagyō Gisho exist only from later copies. The Hokke Gisho contains a colophon stating, "This book belongs to the private collection of King Jōgū [Prince Shōtoku] and is not from overseas." However, the brush style is different from the main text and is believed to have been later added by the priest Gyōshin. The Shōmangyō Gisho and Yuimagyō Gisho have no colophon and no authorship information. All three texts have been attributed to the semi-mythological Prince Shōtoku. However, current scholarly consensus disputes this and the actual authorship of the texts are unknown.

The Nihon Shoki records that in 606, Prince Shōtoku taught the Śrīmālādevī Siṃhanāda Sūtra and the Lotus Sūtra, hence the belief that he authored all three.

On the seventh month of autumn, the empress summoned Hitsugi no Miko and commanded him to teach the Srimala Sutra. He finished in three days. This year, Hitsugi no Miko next taught the Lotus Sutra at Okamoto Palace. The empress was most pleased and presented Hitsugi no Miko with Tamomo Tokoro in Harima Province.

The oldest text to attribute the Sangyōsho to Shōtoku Taishi is the 747 Hōryūji Garan Engi Narabini Ruki Shizaichō (法隆寺伽藍縁起并流記資財帳). In addition, sutra records found in the Shōsōin documents credit King Kamitsumiya, one of Shōtoku Taishi's titles, for the annotated Lotus and Srimala sutras.

While historical records attribute these works to Shōtoku Taishi, a number of issues and problems have been pointed out.

- The oldest records are all more than a hundred years after the death of Shōtoku Taishi, so they are rendered by some scholars as unreliable.
- Religious professor Inoue Mitsusada of the University of Tokyo says that many texts originally attributed to rulers were actually written by groups of scholars and suggests that this is the case here as well. However, the manuscript of Hokke Gisho uses a number of personal pronouns that contrasts this argument.
- Calligrapher Nishikawa Yasushi studied the glyph forms used in the original with those in China and concludes that Hokke Gisho is a work corresponding to the Sui dynasty (581–618 AD). Inoue builds on this suggesting that it is a work of Japan's Asuka period.

The precise development of these texts is strongly argued in modern scholarship with many alternative hypotheses. These include the following:

- Based on Chinese texts brought to Japan that Prince Shōtoku used as a basis for composition.
- Korean priests visiting Japan wrote it under Prince Shōtoku's instructions.
- Produced in China or Korea and authorship was transferred to Prince Shōtoku when it arrived in Japan.
- A later work.

There is no academic consensus on the true authorship. If authorship is assigned to Prince Shōtoku, then the works would need to have been finally completed before 622 when he died.
