= Hobutsushu =

Japanese anthology of setsuwa stories

The Hobutsushu (宝物集, "Collection of Treasures) is a Japanese anthology of setsuwa stories compiled by the monk Taira no Yasuyori in 1179. The same monk in the tale of the heike from the shishigatani incident who was exiled temporarily.

The stories take the form of a series of discussions between a Zen monk and an audience, and are intended to guide the reader towards satori. Among the subjects covered are the stories of Rama, derived from Indian and Chinese sources, and the fate of Murasaki Shikibu, whom Taira no yasuyori condemns to hell for publishing fiction and even wrote the genji Sutra a Buddhist prayer for those that read genji monogatari and Murasaki Shikibu herself for salvation out of Buddhist hell.
