= List of national treasures of Japan (writings: Japanese books) =

Japanese writings

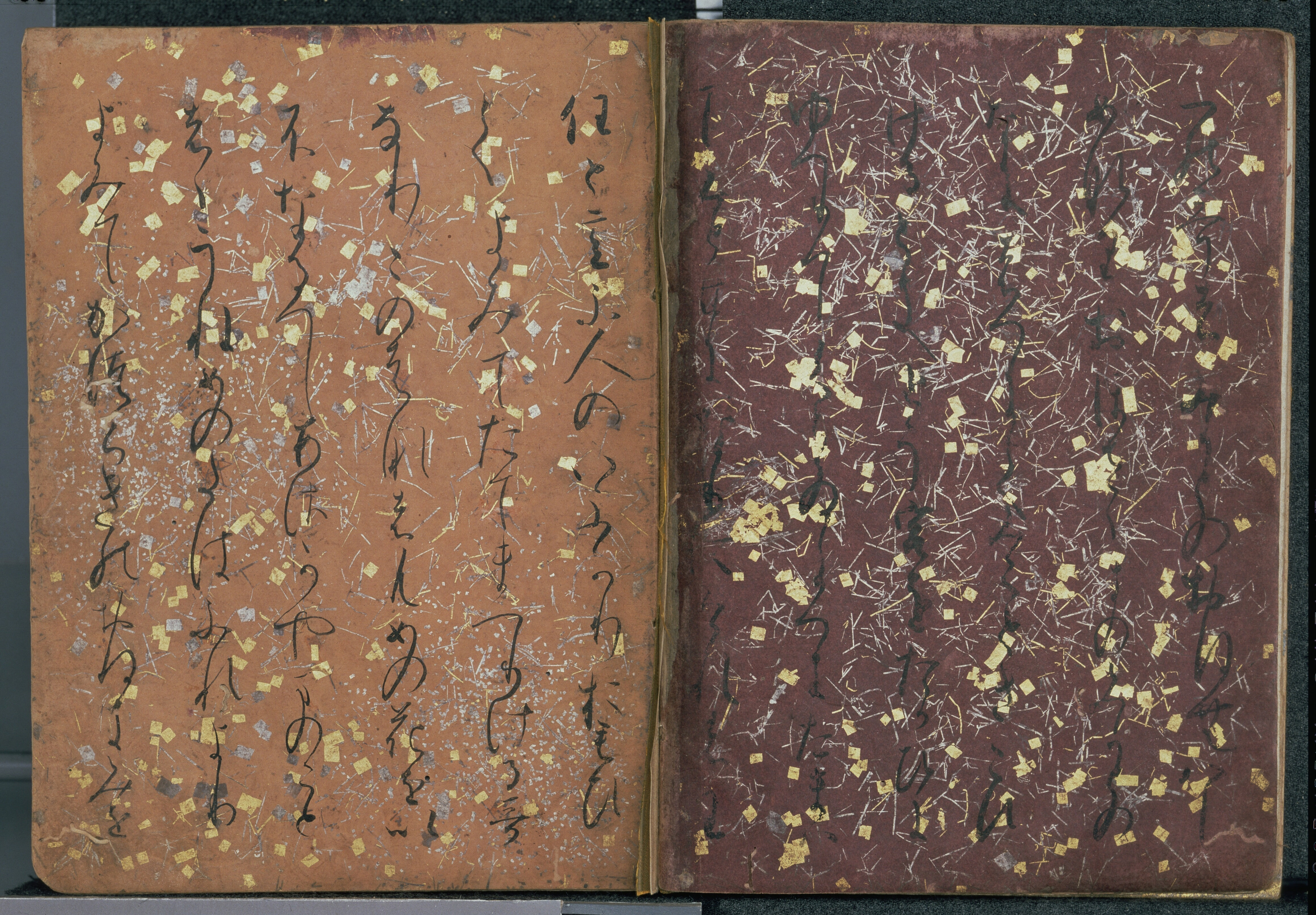
Part of the oldest extant complete manuscript of the Kokin Wakashū poetry anthology

The term "national treasure" has been used in Japan to denote cultural properties since 1897, although the definition and the criteria have changed since the introduction of the term. The written materials in the list adhere to the current definition, and have been designated national treasures according to the Law for the Protection of Cultural Properties that came into effect on June 9, 1951. The items are selected by the Ministry of Education, Culture, Sports, Science and Technology based on their "especially high historical or artistic value".

Writing was introduced from Korea to Japan around 400 AD (in the form of Chinese books), with work done in Chinese by immigrant scribes from the mainland. (Note: Korea and China.) Literacy remained at an extremely marginal level in the 5th and 6th centuries, but during the 7th century a small number of Japanese scholar-aristocrats such as Prince Shōtoku began to write in Chinese for official purposes and in order to promote Buddhism. By the late 7th century, reading and writing had become an integral part of life of some sections of the ruling and intellectual classes, particularly in government and religion. The earliest extant large-scale works compiled in Japan are the historical chronicles Kojiki (712) and Nihon Shoki (720). Other early Japanese works from the Nara period include biographies of Prince Shōtoku, cultural and geographical records (fudoki) and the Man'yōshū, the first anthology of Japanese poetry. Necessarily all of these works were either written in Chinese or in a hybrid Japanese-Chinese style and were modeled on Chinese prototypes. The development of a distinct Japanese script (kana) in the 9th century was the starting point of the classical age of Japanese literature and led to a number of new, uniquely Japanese genres of literature, such as tales (monogatari) or diaries (nikki). Because of the strong interest and support in literature of the Heian court, writing activities flourished particularly in the 10th and 11th centuries.

This list contains books of various type that have been compiled in Classical and early Feudal Japan. More than half of the 72 designated treasures are works of poetry and prose. Another large segment consists of historical works such as manuscripts of the Kojiki and Nihon Shoki; the rest are books of various type such as dictionaries, law books, biographies or music scores. The designated manuscripts date from 9th century Heian period to the Edo period with most dating to the Heian period. They are housed in temples, museums, libraries or archives, universities and in private collections.

The objects in this list represent about one third of the 237 national treasures in the category "writings". They are complemented by 58 Chinese book national treasures and 107 other written national treasures.

== Statistics ==
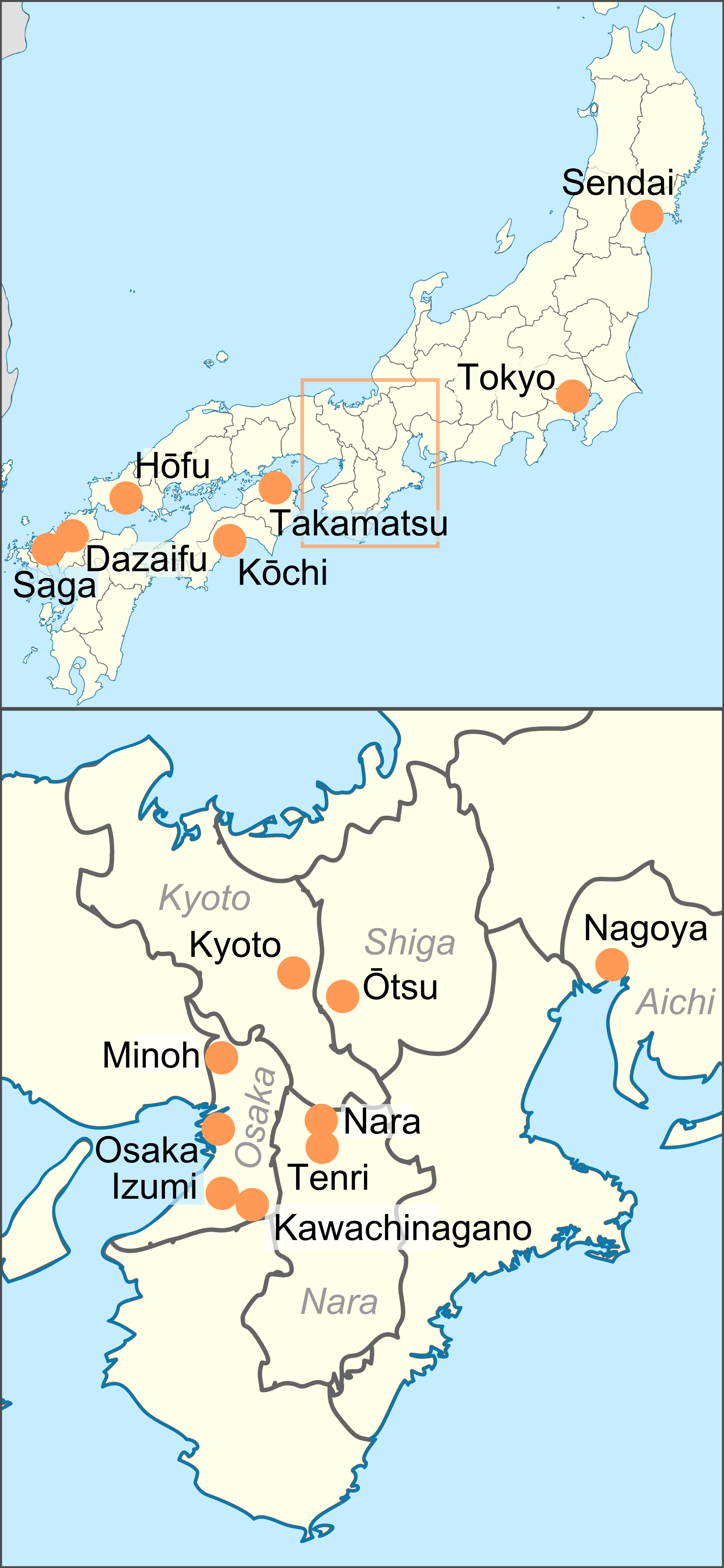
Map showing the location of Japanese book writings national treasures in Japan

Prefecture	City	National treasures
Aichi	Nagoya	1
Fukuoka	Dazaifu	1
Kagawa	Takamatsu	1
Kōchi	Kōchi	1
Kyoto	Kyoto	27
Miyagi	Sendai	1
Nara	Nara	2
Nara	Tenri	3
Osaka	Izumi	1
Osaka	Kawachinagano	2
Osaka	Minoh	1
Osaka	Osaka	2
Saga	Saga	1
Shiga	Ōtsu	1
Tokyo	Tokyo	25
Yamaguchi	Hōfu	1

Period (Note: Only the oldest period is counted, if a national treasure consists of items from more than one period.)	National treasures
Heian period	53
Kamakura period	17
Nanboku-chō period	2

== Usage ==
The table's columns (except for Remarks and Image) are sortable by pressing the arrows symbols. The following gives an overview of what is included in the table and how the sorting works.

- Name: the name as registered in the Database of National Cultural Properties
- Authors: name of the author(s)
- Remarks: information about the type of document and its content
- Date: period and year; the column entries sort by year. If only a period is known, they sort by the start year of that period.
- Format: principal type, technique and dimensions; the column entries sort by the main type: scroll (includes handscrolls and letters), books (includes albums, ordinary bound books and books bound by fukuro-toji) (Note: (袋とじ) binding folded uncut pages in a book, so that there are two blank pages between two pages outside.) and other (includes hanging scrolls)
- Present location: "temple/museum/shrine-name town-name prefecture-name"; the column entries sort as "prefecture-name town-name".
- Image: picture of the manuscript or of a characteristic document in a group of manuscripts

== Treasures ==
=== Japanese literature ===
The adaption of the Chinese script, introduced in Japan in the 5th or 6th century, followed by the 9th century development of a script more suitable to write in the Japanese language, is reflected in ancient and classical Japanese literature from the 7th to 13th century. This process also caused unique genres of Japanese literature to evolve from earlier works modelled on Chinese prototypes. The earliest traces of Japanese literature date to the 7th century and consist of Japanese verse (waka) and poetry written in Chinese by Japanese poets (kanshi). While the latter showed little literary merit compared to the large volume of poems composed in China, waka poetry made great progress in the Nara period culminating in the Man'yōshū, an anthology of more than 4,000 pieces of mainly tanka ("short poem") from the period up to the mid-8th century. Until the 9th century, Japanese language texts were written in Chinese characters via the man'yōgana writing system, generally using the phonetic value of the characters. Since longer passages written in this system became unmanageably long, man'yōgana was used mainly for poetry while classical Chinese was reserved for prose. Consequently, the prose passages in the Man'yōshū are in Chinese and the Kojiki (712), the oldest extant chronicle, uses man'yōgana only for the songs and poems.

A revolutionary achievement was the development of kana, a true Japanese script, in the mid to late 9th century. This new script enabled Japanese authors to write more easily in their own language and led to a variety of vernacular prose literature in the 10th century such as tales (monogatari) and poetic journals (nikki). Japanese waka poetry and Japanese prose reached their highest developments around the 10th century, supported by the general revival of traditional values and the high status ascribed to literature by the Heian court. The Heian period (794 to 1185) is therefore generally referred to as the classical age of Japanese literature. Being the language of scholarship, government and religion, Chinese was still practiced by the male nobility of the 10th century while for the most part aristocratic women wrote diaries, memoirs, poetry and fiction in the new script. The Tale of Genji written in the early 11th century by a noblewoman (Murasaki Shikibu) is according to Helen Craig McCullough the "single most impressive accomplishment of Heian civilization".

Another literary genre called setsuwa ("informative narration") goes back to orally transmitted myths, legends, folktales, and anecdotes. Setsuwa comprise the oldest Japanese tales, were originally Buddhist influenced, and were meant to be educational. The oldest setsuwa collection is the Nihon Ryōiki (early 9th century). With a widening religious and social interest of the aristocracy, setsuwa collections were compiled again in the late 11th century starting with the Konjaku Monogatarishū The high quality of the Tale of Genji influenced the literature into the 11th and 12th centuries. A large number of monogatari and some of the best poetic treatises were written in the early Kamakura period (around 1200).

==== Waka ====
Waka ("Japanese poem") or uta ("song") is an important genre of Japanese literature. The term originated in the Heian period to distinguish Japanese-language poetry from kanshi, poetry written in Chinese by Japanese authors. Waka began as an oral tradition, in tales, festivals and rituals, (Note: Traces of ancient poems of courtship and praise for the ruler survive in the Kojiki, Nihon Shoki and Man'yōshū.) and began to be written in the 7th century. In the Asuka and Nara periods, "waka" included a number of poetic forms such as tanka ("short poems"), chōka ("long poems"), bussokusekika, sedōka ("memorized poem") and katauta ("poem fragment"), but by the 10th century only the 31-syllable tanka survived. The Man'yōshū, of the mid-8th century, is the primary record of early Japanese poetry and the first waka anthology. It contains the three main forms of poetry at time of compilation: 4,200 tanka, 260 chōka and 60 sedōka; dating from 759 backwards more than one century. (Note: The Man'yōshū also consists of a small amount of Chinese poetry (kanshi) and prose (kanbun).)

The early 9th century, however, was a period of direct imitation of Chinese models making kanshi the major form of poetry at the time. In the late 9th century, waka and the development of kana script rose simultaneously with the general revival of traditional values, culminating in the compilation of the first imperial waka anthology, the Kokinshū, in 905. It was followed in 951 by the Gosen Wakashū; in all seven imperial anthologies were compiled in the Heian period. The main poetic subjects were love and the four seasons; the standards of vocabulary, grammar and style, established in the Kokinshū, dominated waka composition into the 19th century.

For aristocrats to succeed in private and public life during the Heian period, it was essential to be fluent in the composition and appreciation of waka, as well as having thorough knowledge of and ability in music, and calligraphy. Poetry was used in witty conversations, in notes of invitation, thanks or condolence, and for correspondence between friends and lovers. Some of the finest poetry of the Heian period came from the middle-class court society such as ladies in waiting or middle-rank officials. Uta-awase poetry contests, in which poets composed poetry on a given theme to be judged by an individual, were held from 885 onwards, and became a regular activity for Heian courtiers from the 10th century onward. Contest judgments led to works about waka theory and critical studies. Poems from the contents were added to imperial anthologies. Critical theories, and the poems in the anthologies (particularly the Kokinshū), became the basis for judgments in the contests. Utaawase continued to be held through the late-11th century, as social rather than literary events. Held in opulence in a spirit of friendly rivalry, they included chanters, scribes, consultants, musicians, and an audience. During the Heian period, waka were often collected in large anthologies, such as the Man'yōshū or Kokinshū, or smaller private collections of the works of a single poet. Waka also featured highly in all kinds of literary prose works including monogatari, diaries and historical works. The Tale of Genji alone contains 800 waka.

At the end of the Heian period, the aristocracy lost political and economical power to warrior clans, but retained the prestige as custodians of high culture and literature. Nostalgia for the Heian court past, considered then as classical Japanese past (as opposed to Chinese past), created a renaissance in the arts and led to a blossoming of waka in the early Kamakura period. Poets of middle and lower rank, such as Fujiwara no Shunzei, Saigyō Hōshi and Fujiwara no Teika, analyzed earlier works, wrote critical commentaries, and added new aesthetic values such as yūgen to waka poetry. Some of the best imperial anthologies and best poetic anthologies, such as Shunzei's Korai fūteishō, were created in the early Kamakura period. The audience was extended from the aristocracy to high ranking warriors and priests, who began to compose waka. By the 14th century, linked verse or renga superseded waka poetry in importance.

There are 30 national treasures of 14 collections of waka and two works on waka style, compiled from between the 8th and the mid-13th century with most from the Heian period. The two works of waka theory are Wakatai jisshu (945) and Korai fūteishō (1197). The collections include the two first imperial waka anthologies: Kokinshū (905, ten treasures) and Gosen Wakashū (951); seven private anthologies: Man'yōshū (after 759, four treasures), Shinsō Hishō (1008), Nyūdō Udaijin-shū (before 1065), Sanjūrokunin Kashū (c. 1112), Ruijū Koshū (before 1120), Shūi Gusō (1216), Myōe Shōnin Kashū (1248); and five utaawase contents: including one imaginary content (Kasen utaawase), the Konoe edition of the Poetry Match in Ten Scrolls (three treasures), Ruijū utaawase, the Poetry competition in 29 rounds at Hirota Shrine and the Record of Poetry Match in Fifteen Rounds. The designated manuscripts of these works found in this list date from the Heian and Kamakura periods.

Waka
Name	Authors	Remarks	Date	Format	Present location	Image
Collection of Ten Thousand Leaves (万葉集, Man'yōshū)	possibly Fujiwara no Korefusa (藤原伊房), grandson of Fujiwara no Yukinari	Also called Aigami Edition (or Ranshi Edition) after the blue dyed paper; transcription is said to have been completed within 4 days only (according to postscript in first volume); written in a masculine style atypical for the period	late Heian period	Fragments of one handscroll (vol. 9), ink on aigami dyed paper, 26.6 cm × 1,133 cm (10.5 in × 446.1 in)	Kyoto National Museum, Kyoto	
Collection of Ten Thousand Leaves (万葉集, Man'yōshū) or Kanazawa Manyō (金沢万葉)	unknown	Handed down in the Maeda clan which had its headquarters in Kanazawa	Heian period, 11th century	One bound book (fragments of vol. 3 (two sheets) and 6 (five sheets)), ink on decorative paper with five-colored design (彩牋, saisen), 21.8 cm × 13.6 cm (8.6 in × 5.4 in)	Maeda Ikutokukai, Tokyo	
Collection of Ten Thousand Leaves (万葉集, Man'yōshū) or Kanazawa Manyō (金沢万葉)	Fujiwara no Sadanobu	Handed down in the Maeda clan which had its headquarters in Kanazawa	Heian period, 12th century	One bound book (fragments of vol. 2 and 4, ink on decorative paper with five-colored design (彩牋, saisen), 21.7 cm × 13.6 cm (8.5 in × 5.4 in)	Museum of the Imperial Collections, Tokyo	
Anthology of Ten Thousand Leaves, Genryaku Edition (元暦校本万葉集, Genryaku kōbon Man'yōshū)	various	Man'yōshū edition with the largest number of poems	Heian period, 11th century; vol. 6: Kamakura period, 12th century; postscript on vol. 20 from June 9, 1184	20 books bound by fukuro-toji, ink on decorated paper, 25.0 cm × 17.0 cm (9.8 in × 6.7 in)	Tokyo National Museum, Tokyo	
Collected Japanese Poems of Ancient and Modern Times (古今集, Kokinshū)	attributed to Fujiwara no Kiyosuke	—	Heian period, 12th century	Two bound books	Maeda Ikutokukai, Tokyo	
Collected Japanese Poems of Ancient and Modern Times (古今集, Kokinshū), Kōya edition	unknown	Oldest extant manuscript of the Kokin Wakashū	Heian period	Fragments of scroll 19	Maeda Ikutokukai, Tokyo	
Collected Japanese Poems of Ancient and Modern Times (古今和歌集, Kokin Wakashū), Gen'ei edition	possibly Fujiwara no Sadazane, grandson of Fujiwara no Yukinari	Oldest complete manuscript of the Kokin Wakashū	Heian period, July 24, 1120	Two bound books, ink on decorative paper, 21.1 cm × 15.5 cm (8.3 in × 6.1 in)	Tokyo National Museum, Tokyo	
Collected Japanese Poems of Ancient and Modern Times (古今和歌集, Kokin Wakashū), Manshu-in edition	unknown	—	Heian period, 11th century	One scroll, ink on colored paper	Manshu-in, Kyoto	
Collected Japanese Poems of Ancient and Modern Times (古今和歌集, Kokin Wakashū)	transcription by Fujiwara no Teika	With attached imperial letters by Emperor Go-Tsuchimikado, Emperor Go-Nara and the draft of a letter by Emperor Go-Kashiwabara	Kamakura period, April 9, 1226	One bound book	Reizei-ke Shiguretei Bunko (冷泉家時雨亭文庫), Kyoto	
Collected Japanese Poems of Ancient and Modern Times (古今和歌集, Kokin Wakashū), Kōya edition	unknown	Oldest extant manuscript of the Kokin Wakashū	Heian period, 11th century	One handscroll (no. 5), ink on decorative paper, 26.4 cm × 573.6 cm (10.4 in × 225.8 in)	private, Tokyo	
Collected Japanese Poems of Ancient and Modern Times (古今和歌集, Kokin Wakashū), Honami edition	unknown	The name of the edition refers to the painter Honami Kōetsu who once owned this scroll; 49 waka from the twelfth volume ("Poems of Love, II); written on imported, Chinese paper with design of mica-imprinted bamboo and peach blossoms	late Heian period, 11th century	Fragments of one scroll (no 12), ink on decorated paper. 16.7 cm × 317.0 cm (6.6 in × 124.8 in)	Kyoto National Museum, Kyoto	
Collected Japanese Poems of Ancient and Modern Times (古今和歌集, Kokin Wakashū), Kōya edition	unknown	Oldest extant manuscript of the Kokin Wakashū	Heian period, 11th century	One scroll (no. 20)	Tosa Yamauchi Family Treasury and Archives, Kōchi, Kōchi	
Collected Japanese Poems of Ancient and Modern Times (古今和歌集, Kokin Wakashū), Kōya edition	possibly Fujiwara no Yukinari	Oldest extant manuscript of the Kokin Wakashū	Heian period, 11th century	One scroll (no. 8), ink on decorated paper	Mōri Museum, Hōfu, Yamaguchi	
Preface to the Collected Japanese Poems of Ancient and Modern Times (古今和歌集序, Kokin Wakashū-jō)	attributed to Minamoto no Shunrai	—	Heian period, 12th century	One handscroll, 33 sheets, ink on colored paper	Okura Museum of Art, Tokyo	
Later Collection (後撰和歌集, Gosen Wakashū)	collated by Fujiwara no Teika	1,425 poems, primarily those that were rejected for inclusion in the Kokin Wakashū	Kamakura period, March 2, 1234	One bound book	Reizei-ke Shiguretei Bunko (冷泉家時雨亭文庫), Kyoto	
Poetry Contest (歌合, utaawase), ten volume edition	purportedly Prince Munetaka	Handed down in the Konoe clan	Heian period, 11th century	Five scrolls (vol. 1, 2, 3, 8, 10), ink on paper	Maeda Ikutokukai, Tokyo	
Poetry Contest (歌合, utaawase), ten volume edition	purportedly Prince Munetaka	Handed down in the Konoe clan	Heian period, 11th century	One scroll (vol. 6), ink on paper, 28.8 cm × 284.1 cm (11.3 in × 111.9 in)	Yōmei Bunko, Kyoto	
Poetry Contest of Great Poets (歌仙歌合, kasen utaawase)	attributed to Fujiwara no Yukinari	Poems in two-column style of 30 famous poets including Kakinomoto no Hitomaro and Ki no Tsurayuki	Heian period, mid 11th century	One scroll, ink on paper	Kubosō Memorial Museum of Arts, Izumi, Osaka	
Poems from the Poetry Match Held by the Empress in the Kanpyō era (寛平御時后宮歌合, kanpyō no ontoki kisai no miya utaawase)	purportedly Prince Munetaka	This scroll was part of the fourth scroll of the ten scroll Poetry Match in Ten Scrolls which was handed down in the Konoe clan; contains 36 of the extant 43 poems from this collection	Heian period, 11th century	One scroll, ink on paper, 28.8 cm × 1,133.2 cm (11.3 in × 446.1 in)	Tokyo National Museum, Tokyo	
Foolish Verses of the Court Chamberlain (拾遺愚草, Shūi gusō; lit.: Gleanings of Stupid Grass)	Fujiwara no Teika	Private anthology of 2,885 poems by Fujiwara no Teika	Kamakura period, 1216	Three bound books	Reizei-ke Shiguretei Bunko (冷泉家時雨亭文庫), Kyoto	
Notes on Poetic Style Through the Ages (古来風躰抄, korai fūteishō)	Fujiwara no Shunzei	Original (first) edition	Kamakura period, 1197	Two bound books	Reizei-ke Shiguretei Bunko (冷泉家時雨亭文庫), Kyoto	
Record of Poetry Match in Fifteen Rounds (十五番歌合, Jūgoban utaawase)	Fujiwara no Korefusa (藤原伊房), grandson of Fujiwara no Yukinari	—	Heian period, 11th century	One scroll, colored paper, 25.3 cm × 532.0 cm (10.0 in × 209.4 in)	Maeda Ikutokukai, Tokyo	
Poetry competition in 29 rounds at Hirota Shrine (広田社二十九番歌合, Hirota-sha nijūkuban utaawase)	Fujiwara no Shunzei	—	Heian period, 1172	Three scrolls, ink on paper	Maeda Ikutokukai, Tokyo	
Ten Varieties of Waka Style (和歌躰十種, Wakatai jisshu)	Possibly Fujiwara no Tadaie (Note: The manuscript calligraphy is attributable to Fujiwara no Tadaie -- see Tokyo National Museum, "Courtly Art: Heian to Muromachi Periods (8c-16c)," Archived 2011-09-28 at the Wayback Machine 2007; curatorial note by Kohitsu Ryōsa (1572–1662) at the end of the scroll -- see National Institutes for Cultural Heritage, "Essay on Ten Styles of Japanese Poems" Archived 2015-09-24 at the Wayback Machine retrieved 2011-07-26.)	Discussion of the ten waka styles with five examples written in hiragana each; also named "Ten Styles of Tadamine" after the purported author of the 945 original work, Mibu no Tadamine; oldest extant manuscript of this work	Heian period, c. 1000	One scroll, ink on decorative paper, 26.0 cm × 324.0 cm (10.2 in × 127.6 in); one hanging scroll (fragment of a book), ink on decorative paper, 26.0 cm × 13.4 cm (10.2 in × 5.3 in)	Tokyo National Museum, Tokyo	
Collection of 36 poets (三十六人家集, sanjūrokunin kashū), Nishi Hongan-ji edition	unknown	Attached to the nomination is a letter by Emperor Go-Nara	Heian period, around 1100 (32 bound books); Kamakura period (one bound book), Edo period (four bound books)	37 bound books	Nishi Honganji, Kyoto	
Poetry Match on Related Themes (類聚歌合, Ruijū utaawase), 20 volume edition	compiled by Minamoto Masazane and Fujiwara no Tadamichi	Large scale compilation of poetry contents until 1126; project started by Minamoto Masazane who was later joined by Fujiwara no Tadamichi	Heian period, 12th century	19 scrolls, ink on paper, 26.8 cm × 2,406.4 cm (10.6 in × 947.4 in) (vol. 8) and 27.0 cm × 2,637.1 cm (10.6 in × 1,038.2 in) (vol. 11)	Yōmei Bunko, Kyoto	
Ruijū Koshū (類聚古集; lit. Collection of similar ancient literature)	Fujiwara no Atsutaka	Re-edited version of the Man'yōshū; poems are categorized by themes such as: season, heaven and earth, and landscape; written in man'yōgana followed by hiragana.	Heian period, before 1120	16 bound books, ink on paper	Ryukoku University, Kyoto	
Collection of Poems by Priest Myōe (明恵上人歌集, Myōe Shōnin Kashū)	Kōshin (高信)	Collection of 112 poems by Myōe and 43 by other poets, compiled by Myōe's disciple Kōshin on the 17th anniversary of Myōe's death	Kamakura period, 1248	One handscroll, ink on paper, 27.8 cm × 1,350 cm (10.9 in × 531.5 in)	Kyoto National Museum, Kyoto	
Collection concealed behind a secluded window (深窓秘抄, Shinsō Hishō)	Fujiwara no Kintō	Collection of 101 poems	Heian period, 1008	One scroll, ink on paper, 26.3 cm × 830 cm (10.4 in × 326.8 in)	Fujita Art Museum, Osaka	
Nyūdō Udaijin-shū (入道右大臣集)	Minamoto no Shunrai and Fujiwara no Teika (pages 6 and 7)	Transcription of poetry anthology by Fujiwara no Yorimune (藤原頼宗)	Heian period	One book bound of 31 pages by fukuro-toji, ink on decorative paper with five-colored design (彩牋, saisen)	Maeda Ikutokukai, Tokyo	

==== Monogatari, Japanese-Chinese poetry, setsuwa ====
There are 13 national treasures of seven works of Japanese prose and mixed Chinese-Japanese poetry compiled from between the early 9th and the first half of the 13th century. The manuscripts in this list date from between the early 10th to the second half of the 13th century. The three volume Nihon Ryōiki was compiled by the private (Note: As opposed to a publicly recognized and certified priest ordained by the ritsuryō state.) priest Kyōkai around 822. It is the oldest collection of Japanese anecdotes or folk stories (setsuwa) which probably came out of an oral tradition. Combining Buddhism with local folk stories, this work demonstrates karmic causality and functioned as a handbook for preaching. Two (Note: They are the so called Kōfuku-ji and Shinpuku-ji manuscripts covering the first volume and the second to third volume respectively.) out of four (Note: The other two manuscripts are the Maeda (vol. 3) and Kōya (fragments of vols. 1 to 3) manuscripts.) extant distinct but incomplete manuscripts have been designated as a national treasures.

One of the earliest kana materials and one of the oldest extant works of Japanese prose fiction is the Tosa Diary written by Ki no Tsurayuki in 935. It is also the oldest Japanese travel diary, giving an account of a return journey to Kyoto after a four-year term as prefect of Tosa Province. The diary consists of close to 60 poems, (Note: Poetry is used to express personal feelings.) connected by prose sections that detail the circumstances and the inspiration for the composition of the poems. The work has been valued as a model for composition in the Japanese style. The original manuscript by Ki no Tsurayuki had been stored at Rengeō-in palace library, and later was in the possession of Ashikaga Yoshimasa, after which its trace is lost. All surviving manuscripts of the Tosa Diary are copies of this Rengeō-in manuscript. The oldest extant of these, by Fujiwara no Teika, dates to 1235. One year later his son, Fujiwara no Tameie, produced another copy based on the original. Both transcriptions are complete facsimiles of the original, inclusive of the text, the layout, orthographical usages, and calligraphy. (Note: Tameie's transcription contains fewer mistakes than Teika's.) They have been designated as national treasures.

The 984 Sanbō Ekotoba ("The three jewels" or "Tale of the three brothers" or "Notes on the pictures of the three jewels"), was written by Minamoto no Tamenori in Chinese for the amusement of a young tonsured princess. It is a collection of Buddhist tales and a guide to important Buddhist ceremonies and figures in Japanese Buddhist history. The designated manuscript from 1273 is known as the Tōji Kanchiin (Note: Named after the Kanchiin subtemple of Tō-ji.) manuscript and is the second oldest of the Sanbō Ekotoba. It is virtually complete unlike the late Heian period (Tōdaiji-gire) which is a scattered assortment of fragments.

The cultural interaction between Japan and China is exemplified by the Wakan Rōeishū, a collection of 234 Chinese poems, 353 poems written in Chinese by Japanese poets (kanshi) and 216 waka, all arranged by topic. Compiled in the early 11th century by Fujiwara no Kintō, it was the first and most successful work of this genre. The English title, "Japanese-Chinese Recitation Collection" indicates that the poems in this collection were meant to be sung. The Wakan Rōeishū has been valued as a source for poetry recitation, waka composition and for its calligraphy, as it displayed kana and kanji. Four manuscripts of the Wakan Rōeishū written on decorated paper and one book have been designated as national treasures: the two scrolls at the Kyoto National Museum contain a complete transcription of the work and are a rare and fully developed example of calligraphy on an ashide-e (Note: A decorative pictorialized style of calligraphy in which characters are disguised in the shape of reeds (ashi), streams, rocks, flowers, birds, etc.) ground; the Konoe edition at Yōmei Bunko is a beautiful example of karakami (Note: An earth-colored based paper imported from China.) with five-colored design (saisen); and the Ōtagire is written on dyed paper decorated with gold drawings.

The Konjaku Monogatarishū from ca. 1120 is the most important setsuwa compilation. It is an anonymous collection of more than 1,000 anecdotes or tales. About two-thirds of the tales are Buddhist, telling about the spread of Buddhism from India via China to Japan. As such it is the first world history of Buddhism written in Japanese. This national treasure is also known as the Suzuka Manuscript and consists of nine volumes (Note: Originally the Konjaku Monogatarishū consisted of 31 volumes of which 28 volumes remain today.) covering setsuwa from India (vols. 2 and 5), China (vols. 7, 9, 10) and Japan (vols. 12, 17, 27, 29). It is considered to be the oldest extant manuscript of the Konjaku Monogatarishū and has served as a source for various later manuscripts.

A commentary on the Genji Monogatari by Fujiwara no Teika, known as Okuiri ("Inside Notes" or "Endnotes") has been designated as a national treasure. Written around 1233 it is the second oldest Genji commentary, supplementing the oldest commentary, the Genji Shaku from 1160.

Monogatari, Japanese-Chinese poetry, setsuwa
Name	Authors	Remarks	Date	Format	Present location	Image
Nihon Ryōiki (日本霊異記) vol. 2, 3	unknown	Japan's oldest collection of Buddhist setsuwa. Until its discovery in 1973 there was no complete text of the Nihon Ryōiki. A copy of the first volume housed at Kōfuku-ji, Nara is also a national treasure.	late Heian period, 12th century	Two bound books (vol. 2, 3), ink on paper	Raigō-in (来迎院), Kyoto	
Nihon Ryōiki (日本霊異記) vol. 1	unknown	Japan's oldest collection of Buddhist setsuwa. A copy of the second volume housed at Raigō-in (来迎院), Kyoto is also a national treasure.	Heian period, 904	One handscroll (17 pages), ink on paper, 29.6 cm × 870 cm (11.7 in × 342.5 in)	Kōfuku-ji, Nara, Nara	
Tosa Diary (土左日記, tosa no nikki)	transcription by Fujiwara no Tameie	Faithful transcription of the 10th century original by Ki no Tsurayuki	Kamakura period, 1236	One bound book, ink on paper, 16.8 cm × 15.3 cm (6.6 in × 6.0 in), 50 pages	Osaka Aoyama Junior College (大阪青山学園, Ōsaka Aoyama gakuen), Minoh, Osaka	
Tosa Diary (土佐日記, tosa nikki)	transcription by Fujiwara no Teika	Faithful transcription of the 10th century original by Ki no Tsurayuki	Kamakura period, 1235	One bound book, ink on paper	Maeda Ikutokukai, Tokyo	
Sarashina Diary (土佐日記, sarashina nikki)	transcription by Fujiwara no Teika	Oldest manuscript of the Sarashina Diary, formerly in possession of Emperor Go-Sai	Kamakura period, 13th century	One bound book, ink on paper, 16.4 cm × 14.5 cm (6.5 in × 5.7 in)	Museum of the Imperial Collections, Tokyo	
Illustration of the Three Jewels (三宝絵詞, Sanbō Ekotoba)	unknown	Illustrated interpretation of the three important concepts of Buddhism: Buddha, Dharma, Sangha; copy of an original by Minamoto no Tamenori (源為憲) (? – 1011)	Kamakura period, 1273	Three books, ink on paper, 27.5 cm × 16.7 cm (10.8 in × 6.6 in)	Tokyo National Museum, Tokyo	
Wakan rōeishū in ashide-e technique (芦手絵和漢朗詠抄, ashide-e wakan rōeishō)	Fujiwara no Koreyuki (藤原伊行)	Combination of script and decorative motifs (ashide-e technique): reeds, water fowl, flying birds, rocks and wheels, in navy blue, greenish-blue, brownish-red and silver	late Heian period, 1160	Two handscrolls, ink on paper, 27.9 cm × 367.9 cm (11.0 in × 144.8 in) and 27.9 cm × 422.9 cm (11.0 in × 166.5 in)	Kyoto National Museum, Kyoto	
Wakanshō, second volume (倭漢抄下巻, wakanshō gekan), Konoe edition	attributed to Fujiwara no Yukinari	Written on paper imprinted with motifs of plants, tortoise shells and phoenix in mica	Heian period, 11th century	Two handscrolls, ink on decorative paper with five-colored design (彩牋, saisen)	Yōmei Bunko, Kyoto	
Wakan rōeishū (倭漢朗詠抄, wakan rōeishō), fragments of second volume or Ōtagire (太田切)	attributed to Fujiwara no Yukinari	Handed down in the Ōta clan, daimyōs of the Kakegawa Domain	Heian period, early 11th century	Two handscrolls, ink on decorated paper (gold drawings on paper printed and dyed), height: 25.7 cm (10.1 in), lengths: 337.3 cm (132.8 in) and 274.4 cm (108.0 in)	Seikadō Bunko Art Museum, Tokyo	
Wakan rōeishū on cloud-patterned paper (和漢朗詠集 雲紙, wakan rōeishū kumogami)	Minamoto no Kaneyuki	Oldest surviving complete relic of cloud paper with a unique arrangement of clouds diagonally in the lower right and upper left corners.	Heian period, 11th century	Two handscrolls, ink on decorated paper (cloud paper with indigo cloud shapes), 27.6 cm × 1,468.9 cm (10.9 in × 578.3 in)	Museum of the Imperial Collections, Tokyo	
Wakan rōeishū on karakami paper (和漢朗詠集 雲紙, wakan rōeishū karakami)	—	One of the oldest extant copies of the wakan rōeishū.	Heian period	Two bound books, ink on karakami paper, 20.0 cm × 12.1 cm (7.9 in × 4.8 in)	Museum of the Imperial Collections, Tokyo	
Anthology of Tales from the Past (今昔物語集, Konjaku Monogatarishū)	unknown	Collection of tales	late Heian period	Nine books bound by fukuro-toji (vol. 2, 5, 7, 9, 10, 12, 17, 27, 29)	Kyoto University, Kyoto	
Commentary on The Tale of Genji (源氏物語奥入, Genji Monogatari okuiri)	Fujiwara no Teika	Oldest extant commentary on The Tale of Genji	Kamakura period, c. 1233	One handscroll, ink on paper	private, Kyoto	

=== History books and historical tales ===
The oldest known (Note: Older texts such as the Tennōki, Kokki, Kyūji or Teiki from the 7th century have been lost, while others such as the Sangyō Gisho or the Taihō Code are relatively short or only exist as fragments.) Japanese (Note: Composed in Japan on Japanese topics; most notably, the Japanese language is not meant here.) large-scale works are historical books (Kojiki and Nihon Shoki) or regional cultural and geographical records (fudoki) compiled on imperial order in the early 8th century. They were written with the aim of legitimizing the new centralized state under imperial rule by linking the origin of emperors to the Age of the Gods. The oldest of these historical books is the Kojiki ("Record of ancient matters") dating from 712 and composed by Ō no Yasumaro at the request of Empress Genmei. Written in ancient Japanese style using Chinese ideographs, it presents the mythological origin of Japan and historical events up to the year 628. Shortly after the completion of the Kojiki, the Nihon Shoki (or Nihongi) appeared in 720, probably originating to an order by Emperor Tenmu in 681. It is a much more detailed version of the Kojiki, dating events and providing alternative versions of myths; it covers the time up to 697. Compared to the Kojiki, it follows the model of Chinese dynastic histories more closely in style and language, using orthodox classical Chinese. Both of these works provide the historical and spiritual basis for shinto.

In 713, Empress Genmei ordered provincial governors to compile official reports on the history, geography and local folk customs. These provincial gazetteers are known as fudoki (lit. "Records of wind and earth") and provide valuable information about economic and ethnographic data, local culture and tales. Of more than 60 provincial records compiled in the early 8th century only five survived: one, the Izumo Fudoki (733), in complete form and four, Bungo (730s), Harima (circa 715), Hitachi (714–718) and Hizen (730s) as fragments. The Nihon Shoki is the first official history of Japan and the first of a set of six national histories (Rikkokushi) compiled over a 200-year period on Chinese models. Based on these six histories, Sugawara no Michizane arranged historical events chronologically and thematically in the Ruijū Kokushi which was completed in 892.

With the cessation of official missions to China and a general trend of turning away from Chinese-derived institutions and behavioral patterns in the latter part of the 9th century, the compilation of such national histories patterned on formal Chinese dynastic histories was abandoned. With the development of kana script, new styles of uniquely Japanese literature such as the monogatari appeared around that time. The newer style of historic writing that emerged during the Fujiwara regency, at the turning point of ancient imperial rule and the classical era, was called historic tale (rekishi monogatari) and became influenced by the fictional tale, especially by the Tale of Genji, with which it shared the scene-by-scene construction as fundamental difference to earlier historic writings. (Note: Other differences are: a realistic dialogue, the presentation of more than one viewpoint and the embellishment with a wealth of realistic detail.) The oldest historical tale is the Eiga Monogatari ("A Tale of Flowering Fortunes"), giving a eulogistic chronological account of the Fujiwara from 946 to 1027, focusing particularly on Fujiwara no Michinaga. It was largely (Note: 30 out of 40 volumes.) written by Akazome Emon, probably shortly after the death of Michinaga in 1027.

There are eleven national treasures in the category of historical books including one manuscript of the Kojiki, five manuscripts of the Nihon Shoki, the Harima and Hizen Fudoki, two manuscripts of the Ruijū Kokushi and one of the Eiga Monogatari. All of these treasures are later copies and with the exception of the Eiga Monogatari, the complete content of the works has to be assembled from several of these (and other) fragmentary manuscripts or be inferred from other sources. The Kojiki, long neglected by scholars until the 18th century, was not preserved as well as the Nihon Shoki which has been studied from soon after its compilation. While being the oldest text in this list, the extant manuscript dating to the 14th century is the earliest entry.

History books and historical tales
Name	Authors	Remarks	Date	Format	Present location	Image
The Records of Ancient Matters (古事記, Kojiki), Shinpukuji manuscript (真福寺本)	transcription by the monk Ken'yu (賢瑜)	Oldest extant manuscript of the Kojiki	Nanboku-chō period, 1371–1372	Three bound books	Ōsu Kannon Hōshō-in (宝生院), Nagoya, Aichi	
The Chronicles of Japan (日本書紀, Nihon Shoki), Maeda edition	unknown	Part of the six national histories (Rikkokushi); handed down in the Maeda clan	Heian period, 11th century	Four handscrolls (volumes 11, 14, 17, 20), ink on paper	Maeda Ikutokukai, Tokyo	
The Chronicles of Japan (日本書紀, Nihon Shoki), Iwasaki edition	unknown	Part of the six national histories (Rikkokushi); handed down in the Iwasaki family	Heian period, around 1100	Two handscrolls (volumes 22, 24: "Empress Suiko", "Emperor Jomei"), ink on paper	Kyoto National Museum, Kyoto	
Age of the Gods, chapters from The Chronicles of Japan (日本書紀神代巻, Nihon Shoki jindai-kan), Yoshida edition	Urabe Kanekata (卜部兼方)	With a postscript by Urabe Kanekata; handed down in the Yoshida branch of the Urabe family; part of the six national histories (Rikkokushi)	Kamakura period, 1286	Two handscrolls (volumes 1, 2), ink on paper, 29.7 cm × 3,012 cm (11.7 in × 1,185.8 in) and 30.3 cm × 3,386 cm (11.9 in × 1,333.1 in)	Kyoto National Museum, Kyoto	
Age of the Gods, chapters from The Chronicles of Japan (日本書紀神代巻, Nihon Shoki jindai-kan), Yoshida edition	transcription and postscript by Urabe Kanekata (卜部兼方)	Handed down in the Yoshida branch of the Urabe family; part of the six national histories (Rikkokushi)	Kamakura period, 1303	Two handscrolls (volumes 1, 2), ink on paper, 29 cm × 2,550 cm (11 in × 1,004 in) and 29 cm × 2,311 cm (11 in × 910 in)	Tenri University Library (天理大学附属天理図書館, Tenri daigaku fuzoku Tenri toshokan), Tenri, Nara	
The Chronicles of Japan (日本書紀, Nihon Shoki), Tanaka edition	unknown	Oldest extant transcription of The Chronicles of Japan; considered to be stylistically close to the original from 720; contains a copy of the Collected Writings of Kūkai from the late Heian period on the back	Heian period, 9th century	Fragments (nine out of eleven sheets, first and last page missing) of one handscroll (vol. 10: "Emperor Ōjin"), ink on paper, 28.0 cm × 566.0 cm (11.0 in × 222.8 in)	Nara National Museum, Nara, Nara	
Fudoki of Harima Province (播磨国風土記, Harima no kuni fudoki)	unknown	Transcription of an ancient record of culture and geography from the early Nara period; oldest extant fudoki manuscript	end of Heian period	One handscroll, ink on paper, 28.0 cm × 886.0 cm (11.0 in × 348.8 in)	Tenri University Library (天理大学附属天理図書館, Tenri daigaku fuzoku Tenri toshokan), Tenri, Nara	
Fudoki of Hizen Province (肥前国風土記, Hizen no kuni fudoki)	unknown	Transcription of an ancient record of culture and geography from the early Nara period	Kamakura period	One bound book	Owner: private; Custody of: Kagawa Museum (香川県歴史博物館, Kagawa-ken Rekishi Hakubutsukan), Takamatsu, Kagawa Prefecture	
Ruijū Kokushi (類聚国史)	unknown	Collected by Maeda Tsunanori; one of the oldest extant manuscript of the Ruijū Kokushi	Heian period, 12th century	Four handscrolls (volumes 165, 171, 177, 179), ink on paper	Maeda Ikutokukai, Tokyo	
Ruijū Kokushi (類聚国史)	unknown	Formerly in the possession of Kanō Kōkichi (狩野亨吉), a doctor of literature at the Kyoto Imperial University; one of the oldest extant manuscript of the Ruijū Kokushi	late Heian period	One handscroll (vol. 25), 27.9 cm × 159.4 cm (11.0 in × 62.8 in)	Tohoku University, Sendai, Miyagi	
Eiga Monogatari (栄花物語)	unknown	Epic about the life of the courtier Fujiwara no Michinaga; oldest extant manuscript; handed down in the Sanjōnishi family	Kamakura period (Ōgata: mid-Kamakura, Masugata: early Kamakura)	17 bound books: 10 from the Ōgata edition (until scroll 20), 7 from the Masugata edition (until scroll 40), ink on paper, 30.6 cm × 24.2 cm (12.0 in × 9.5 in) (Ōgata) and 16.3 cm × 14.9 cm (6.4 in × 5.9 in) (Masugata)	Kyushu National Museum, Dazaifu, Fukuoka	

=== Others ===
There are 18 Japanese book national treasures that do not belong to any of the above categories. They cover 14 works of various types, including biographies, law or rulebooks, temple records, music scores, a medical book and dictionaries. Two of the oldest works designated are biographies of the Asuka period regent Shōtoku Taishi. The Shitennō-ji Engi, alleged to have been an autobiography by Prince Shōtoku, described Shitennō-ji, and may have been created to promote the temple. The Shitennō-ji Engi national treasure consists of two manuscripts: the alleged original discovered in 1007 at Shitennō-ji and a later transcription by Emperor Go-Daigo. Written by imperial order in the early 8th century, the Jōgū Shōtoku Hōō Teisetsu is the oldest extant biography of Shōtoku. It consists of a collection of anecdotes, legendary and miraculous in nature, which emphasize Shōtoku's Buddhist activities for the sake of imperial legitimacy, and stands at the beginning of Buddhist setsuwa literature. The oldest extant manuscript of the 803 Enryaku Kōtaishiki, a compendium of rules concerned with the change of provincial governors from 782 to 803, has been designated as a national treasure.

The oldest extant Japanese lexica date to the early Heian period. Based on the Chinese Yupian, the Tenrei Banshō Meigi was compiled around 830 by Kūkai and is the oldest extant character dictionary made in Japan. The Hifuryaku is a massive Chinese dictionary in 1000 fascicles listing the usage of words and characters in more than 1500 texts of diverse genres. Compiled in 831 by Shigeno Sadanushi and others, it is the oldest extant Japanese proto-encyclopedia. There are two national treasures of the Ishinpō, the oldest extant medical treatise of Japanese authorship compiled in 984 by Tanba Yasuyori. It is based on a large number of Chinese medical and pharmaceutical texts and contains knowledge about drug prescription, herbal lore, hygiene, acupuncture, moxibustion, alchemy and magic. The two associated treasures consist of the oldest extant (partial) and the oldest extant complete manuscript respectively.

Compiled between 905 and 927 by Tadahira, the Engishiki is the most respected legal compendium of the ritsuryō age and an important resource for the study of the Heian period court system. Emperor Daigo commanded its compilation; the Engishiki is according to David Lu an "invaluable" resource and "one of the greatest compilations of laws and precedents". The three designated national treasures of the Engishiki represent the oldest extant manuscript (Kujō edition) and the oldest extant edition of certain date (Kongōji edition). Two national treasure manuscripts are related to music: the oldest extant kagura song book (Kagura wagon hifu) from around the 10th century and the oldest extant Saibara score (Saibara fu) which is traditionally attributed to Prince Munetaka but based on the calligraphy it appears to date to the mid-11th century. The Hokuzanshō consists of writings by Fujiwara no Kintō on court customs and the function of the Daijō-kan. The designated Kyoto National Museum manuscript of the Hokuzanshō from about 1000 is noted for one of the few early extant examples of hiragana use and for the oldest extant letters in kana written on the reverse side of the scroll. Around the early 12th century a Shingon Buddhist priest compiled a dictionary with a large number of variant form characters known as Ruiju Myōgishō. The designated Kanchiin edition is the oldest extant complete manuscript of this work. Among the youngest items in this list are two temple records: the Omuro Sōjōki giving an account of priests of imperial lineage at Ninna-ji starting from the Kanpyō era, while the 1352 Tōhōki records treasures held at Tō-ji. Kōbō Daishi's biography in an original manuscript penned by Emperor Go-Uda in 1315 has been designated as a national treasure.

Others
Name	Authors	Remarks	Date	Format	Present location	Image
Legendary history of Shitennō-ji (四天王寺縁起, Shitennō-ji engi)	Prince Shōtoku (?) and Emperor Go-Daigo (transcription)	Document on the origin of Shitennō-ji and transcription	Heian period and Nanboku-chō period, 1335	Two scrolls	Shitennō-ji, Osaka	
Anecdotes of the sovereign dharma King Shōtoku of the Upper Palace (上宮聖徳法王帝説, Jōgū Shōtoku Hōō Teisetsu)	unknown	Biography of Shōtoku Taishi	Heian period, 1050 (parts written by early 8th century)	One scroll, ink on paper, 26.7 cm × 228.8 cm (10.5 in × 90.1 in)	Chion-in, Kyoto	
Enryaku regulations on the transfer of office (延暦交替式, Enryaku Kōtaishiki)	unknown	Oldest extant copy of the original from 803	Heian period, around 859–877	One scroll, ink on paper	Ishiyama-dera, Ōtsu, Shiga	
The myriad things, pronounced, defined, in seal script and clerical script (篆隷万象名義, Tenrei Banshō Meigi)	unknown	Oldest extant Kanji dictionary. Transcription of the original by Kūkai from around 830–835	Heian period, 1114	Six bound books by fukuro-toji, ink on paper, 26.8 cm × 14.6 cm (10.6 in × 5.7 in)	Kōzan-ji, Kyoto	
Hifuryaku (秘府略)	unknown	Part of the 1000 scrolls Hifuryaku, the oldest Japanese proto-encyclopedia from 831	Heian period	One scroll, ink on paper: vol. 868	Maeda Ikutokukai, Tokyo	
Ishinpō (医心方), Nakarai edition	unknown	Handed down in the Nakarai family; oldest extant transcription of this work	Heian period, 12th century (Note: 27 scrolls from Heian period, one scroll from Kamakura period, two scrolls and one bound manuscript added in Edo period.)	30 scrolls, one bound book by fukuro-toji, ink on paper. Scroll 1: 27.7 cm × 248.0 cm (10.9 in × 97.6 in)	Tokyo National Museum, Tokyo	
Ishinpō (医心方)	unknown	Thought to be closer to the original as it contains fewer annotations than the Nakarai edition of the Ishinpō	Heian period	Five bound books, volumes 1, 5, 7, 9, fragments of 10	Ninna-ji, Kyoto	
Rules and regulations concerning ceremonies and other events (延喜式, Engishiki), Kujō edition	unknown (more than one person)	Handed down in the Kujō family; the reverse side of 23 of these scrolls contain about 190 letters; oldest extant and most complete copy of Engishiki	Heian period, 11th century	27 scrolls, ink on paper; vol. 2: 27.5 cm × 825.4 cm (10.8 in × 325.0 in), vol. 39: 28.7 cm × 1,080.2 cm (11.3 in × 425.3 in), vol. 42: 33.6 cm × 575.1 cm (13.2 in × 226.4 in)	Tokyo National Museum, Tokyo	
Rules and regulations concerning ceremonies and other events (延喜式, Engishiki) Kongōji edition	unknown	Oldest extant Engishiki manuscript of certain date	Heian period, 1127	Three scrolls, ink on paper: vol. 12 fragments, vol. 14, vol. 16	Kongō-ji, Kawachinagano, Osaka	
Register of Shrines in Japan (延喜式神名帳, Engishiki Jinmyōchō)	unknown	Volumes 9 and 10 of the Engishiki contain a register of Shinto shrines	Heian period, 1127	One scroll, ink on paper: vol. 9 and 10	Kongō-ji, Kawachinagano, Osaka	
Secret kagura music for the six-stringed zither (神楽和琴秘譜, Kagura wagon hifu)	attributed to Fujiwara no Michinaga	Oldest extant kagura song book	Heian period, 10th–11th century	One handscroll, ink on paper, 28.5 cm × 398.4 cm (11.2 in × 156.9 in)	Yōmei Bunko, Kyoto	
Manual on Courtly Etiquette (北山抄, Hokuzanshō)	unknown	Transcription of the early 11th century original by Fujiwara no Kintō	Heian period	Twelve scrolls	Maeda Ikutokukai, Tokyo	
Manual on Courtly Etiquette, Volume 10 (稿本北山抄, kōhon Hokuzanshō)	Fujiwara no Kintō	Draft to the Manual on Courtly Etiquette. Only extant volume of the original work in the author's own handwriting and oldest extant letters (on reverse side) in kana. Volume title: Guidance on Court Service. The paper used was taken from old letters and official documents.	Heian period, early 11th century, before 1012	One handscroll, ink on paper, 30.3 cm × 1,279.0 cm (11.9 in × 503.5 in)	Kyoto National Museum, Kyoto	
Saibara Music Score (催馬楽譜, Saibara fu)	attributed to Prince Munetaka	Oldest extant Saibara score	Heian period, mid 11th century	One bound book by fukuro-toji, ink on paper with flying cloud design, 25.5 cm × 16.7 cm (10.0 in × 6.6 in)	Nabeshima Hōkōkai, Saga, Saga	
Classified dictionary of pronunciations and meanings, annotated (類聚名義抄, Ruiju Myōgishō), Kanchi-in edition	unknown	Oldest extant complete edition; expanded and revised edition of the 11th century original	mid-Kamakura period	Eleven bound books	Tenri University Library (天理大学附属天理図書館, Tenri daigaku fuzoku Tenri toshokan), Tenri, Nara	
Omuro sōjōki (御室相承記)	unknown	—	early Kamakura period	Six scrolls	Ninna-ji, Kyoto	
Go-Uda tennō shinkan Kōbō Daishi den (後宇多天皇宸翰弘法大師伝)	Emperor Go-Uda	Biography of Kōbō-Daishi (Kūkai), original manuscript	Kamakura period, March 21, 1315	One hanging scroll, ink on silk, 37.3 cm × 123.6 cm (14.7 in × 48.7 in)	Daikaku-ji, Kyoto	
History of Tō-ji (東宝記, Tōhōki)	edited by Gōhō (杲宝) and Kenpō (賢宝)	Record of treasures at Tō-ji	Nanboku-chō period to Muromachi period	Twelve scrolls, one bound book by fukuro-toji	Tō-ji, Kyoto	

== See also ==
- Nara Research Institute for Cultural Properties
- Tokyo Research Institute for Cultural Properties
- Independent Administrative Institution National Museum
