= Nihon Ryōiki =

Heian period setsuwa collection

The Nihon Ryōiki (日本霊異記) is an early Heian period setsuwa collection. Written by Kyōkai between 787 and 824, it is Japan's oldest collection of Buddhist setsuwa. It is three volumes in length.

== Title ==
Commonly abbreviated as Nihon Ryōiki, which means "Record of Miraculous Events in Japan," the full title is Nihonkoku Genpō Zen'aku Ryōiki (日本国現報善悪霊異記). It may also be read as Nihon Reiiki. The book has been translated into English under the title Miraculous Stories from the Japanese Buddhist Tradition, but this does not represent a literal translation of the Japanese title.

== Contents ==
The work is composed of three parts contained within three volumes. Each volume begins with a preface, and the final volume contains an epilogue. There are a total of 116 tales all dealing with Buddhist elements. There are also a total of nine poems.

== Manuscripts ==
There are five existing manuscripts, two of which are designated National Treasures:

- Kōfuku-ji, 904 (National Treasure)
- Maeda estate, 1236
- Raigō-in, late Heian period (National Treasure)
- Sanmai-in, 1214
- Shinpuku-ji, Kamakura period

All manuscripts are incomplete. The full text must be reconstructed from the multiple sources, and this was only possible after the Raigō-in manuscript was discovered in 1973.

== Linguistics ==
The text contains a number of words in man'yōgana, an archaic orthography that may be used to express Jōdai Tokushu Kanazukai. While it is an Early Middle Japanese text, it is early enough to still preserve the distinction between ko_{1}, ko_{2} and pe_{1}, pe_{2} prior to their merges.
