= Tenrei Banshō Meigi =

Oldest extant Japanese dictionary of Chinese characters

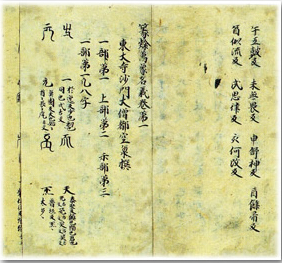
Transcription of the Tenrei Banshō Meigi

The Tenrei banshō meigi or Tenrei banshō myōgi (Kyujitai: 篆隷萬象名義, Shinjitai: 篆隷万象名義; "The myriad things [of the universe], pronounced, defined, in seal script and clerical script") is the oldest extant Japanese dictionary of Chinese characters.

The prominent Heian period monk and scholar Kūkai, founder of the Shingon Buddhism, edited his Tenrei banshō meigi around 830–835 CE, and based it upon the (circa 543 CE) Chinese Yupian dictionary. Among the Tang dynasty Chinese books that Kūkai brought back to Japan in 806 CE was an original edition Yupian and a copy of the (121 CE) Shuowen Jiezi. One of the National Treasures of Japan held at the Kōzan-ji temple is an 1114 copy of the Tenrei banshō meigi.

The Chinese Yupian dictionary defines 12,158 characters under a system of 542 radicals (bùshǒu 部首), which slightly modified the original 540 in the Shuowen jiezi. The Japanese Tenrei banshō meigi defines approximately 1,000 kanji (Chinese characters), under 534 radicals (bu 部), with a total of over 16,000 characters. Each entry gives the Chinese character in ancient seal script, Chinese pronunciation in fanqie, and definition, all copied from the Yupian. The American Japanologist Don Bailey writes:

At the time of its compilation, calligraphic style and the Chinese readings and meanings of the characters were probably about all that was demanded of a dictionary, so that the Tenrei banshō meigi suited the scholarly needs of the times. It was compiled in Japan by a Japanese but is in no sense a Japanese dictionary, for it contains not one Wakun (Japanese reading).

In modern terms, this dictionary gives borrowed on'yomi "Sino-Japanese readings" but not native kun'yomi "Japanese readings". A later Heian dictionary, the (898–901 CE) Shinsen Jikyō was the first to include Japanese readings.

Ikeda Shoju has studied the conversion of JIS encoding to Unicode in order to create an online Tenrei banshō meigi.
