= Setsuwa =

Japanese literary genre

Setsuwa (Japanese: 説話, romanized: setsuwa) is a Japanese literary genre. It consists of myths, legends, folktales, and anecdotes. Among the setsuwa, those that are full-length are generally referred to as monogatari. In Japan, the term setsuwa is also applied to similar works around the world.

Setsuwa means "spoken story". As one of the vaguest forms of literature, setsuwa is believed to have been passed down or presented in the form of narrations. Setsuwa are based foremost on oral tradition and existed primarily as folktales or in other non-written forms before being recorded and committed to text. However, some writers question whether all setsuwa tales were originally oral tradition, or only mostly so. Although there are no formal rules regarding what constitutes setsuwa as a genre, stories in the setsuwa style "have in common brevity; an uncomplicated plot unfolded in plain, direct language; character delineation through dialogue and action rather than through description and psychological analysis; and a predilection for amusing, startling, dramatic, or marvelous subject matter."

Setsuwa vary quite considerably in topic, but can be divided into two main groups: general and Buddhist. Buddhist setsuwa often contain themes of karmic retribution or miracles, while the content of “general” setsuwa is largely either secular in nature or focused on traditional Japanese religion and spirituality such as Shinto.

Many setsuwa collections were compiled during the Heian and Kamakura periods (8th-12th centuries, 12th-14th centuries). These collections were often assembled by Buddhist monks, but the authorship of many such works is still unknown or heavily debated.

Setsuwa may be found integrated in other literature or in setsuwa collections. The myths found within Kojiki (712) are the oldest individual ones known to exist. The Nihon Ryōiki (c. 822) is the oldest setsuwa collection.

The setsuwa genre last until the early 14th century when it was succeeded by the otogizōshi genre.

== Notable examples ==
The Nihon Ryōiki, shortened from the full title Nihonkoku Genpō Zen'aku Ryōiki (A Chronicle of Wondrous Tales of Good and Evil in Japan), is a collection of setsuwa tales focused entirely on Buddhist themes, and is the oldest known collection of Buddhist legends in the setsuwa style. Nihon Ryōiki was compiled in the early 9th century (Heian period) by the monk Kyōkai, and contains 116 stories split between three volumes as well as nine poems. These stories originate both from older sources and from times contemporary to the compilation’s completion, and— like many Buddhist setsuwa— are often focused on the concept of karmic retribution. No single complete manuscript of the Nihon Ryōiki exists— the complete text must be assembled from multiple sources.

Konjaku Monogatarishū (Anthology of Tales from the Past) is a large compilation of disputed authorship (many suggest that the compilation was assembled by a Buddhist monk) comprising tales in the setsuwa style. Konjaku Monogatarishū was composed in Japan during the late Heian period, though the exact date of completion is unknown. Konjaku Monogatarishū contains over one thousand tales, and the works draw their content largely from folklore— both Buddhist and secular— from India, China, and Japan. The stories assembled contain relatively few references to Shinto and other non-Buddhist Japanese spirituality. The tales are not of great length, keeping with the style of setsuwa and its basis in oral tradition. The collection contains stories focusing on characters and happenings of many origins, including monks, peasantry, and nobility.

The Tendai priest Keisei wrote Kankyo no Tomo in 1222.

== See also ==
- Japanese folktales
