= Maeda Ikutokukai =

Japanese public interest corporation

Coordinates: 35°39′43.07″N 139°40′48.52″E

The Maeda Ikutokukai (前田育徳会) is a Japanese public interest corporation (公益法人) established on February 26, 1926, for the management and preservation of the cultural heritage of the Maeda clan, rulers of the Kaga Domain. It is located in Komaba, Meguro, Tokyo. The collection is centered on written materials including ancient documents or Japanese and Chinese books but also contains crafts items such as swords, armour or household items. The writings held by the foundation are known as Sonkeikaku library (尊経閣文庫, Sonkeikaku bunko) which is also used as an alias for Maeda Ikutokukai. This collection of old books, ancient records and documents is open to researchers on request only. The library's name is derived from the personal book collection of the 5th daimyō of Kanazawa Domain, Maeda Tsunanori, known as Sonkeikaku zōsho (尊経閣蔵書), which is distinct from the ancestral collection.

22 National Treasures and 76 Important Cultural Properties of Japan are in possession of Maeda Ikutokukai. As the library does not have the display facilities of a museum, viewing requests are generally denied. However, the Ishikawa Prefectural Museum of Art in Kanazawa contains an exhibition room devoted to the Maeda Ikutokukai collection in which arts and crafts items are permanently on display.

== See also ==
- Sonkeikaku Library (ja)
- List of National Treasures of Japan (ancient documents)
- List of National Treasures of Japan (writings: Chinese books)
- List of National Treasures of Japan (writings: Japanese books)
- List of National Treasures of Japan (writings: others)
- List of National Treasures of Japan (crafts: swords)
