= Kōzan-ji =

Buddhist temple in Kyoto Prefecture, Japan

Coordinates: 35°03′37″N 135°40′42″E

Kōzan-ji 高山寺
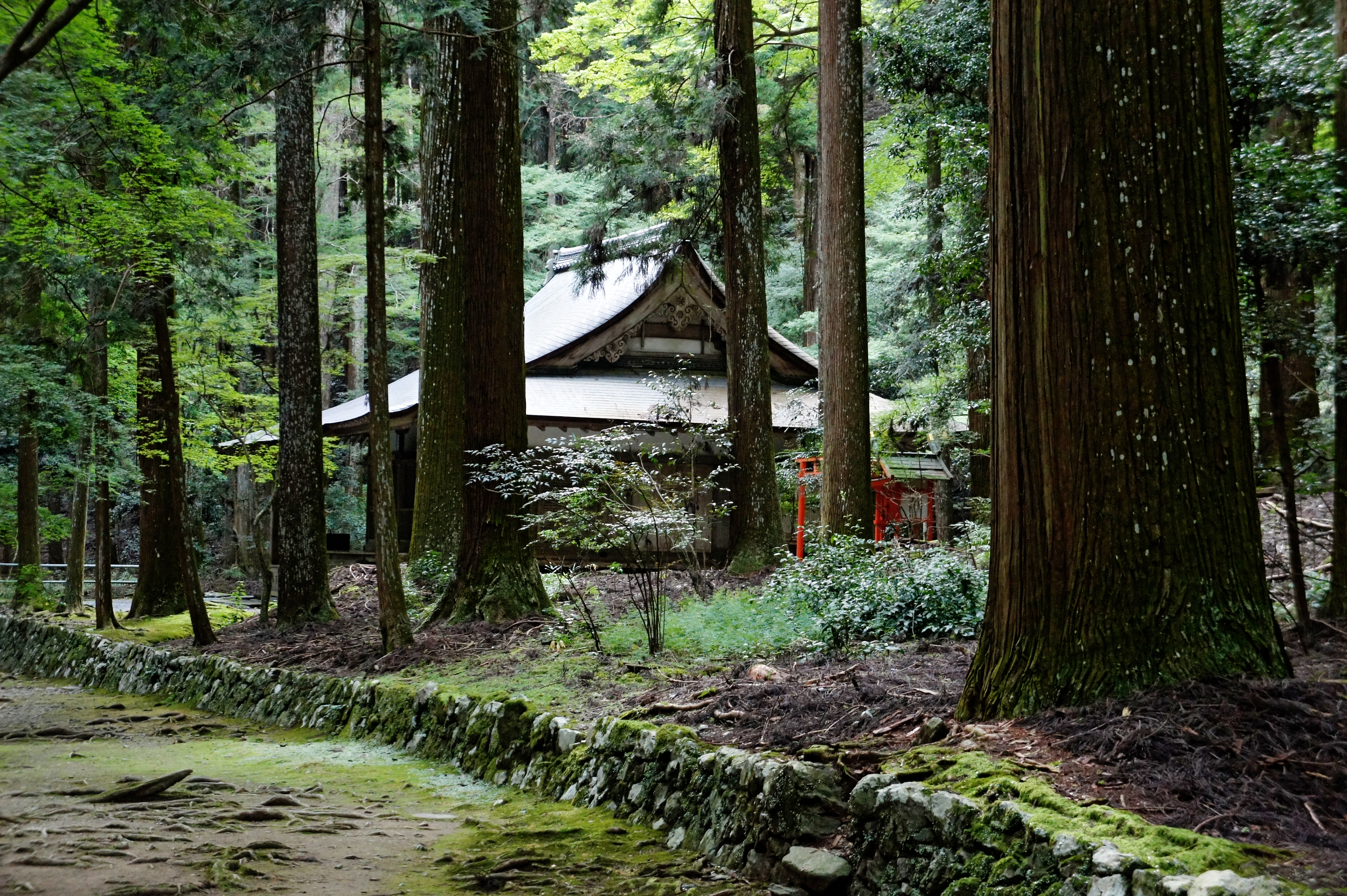
- Path to the Golden Hall

Religion
- Affiliation: Shingon Buddhism
- Deity: Shaka Nyorai (Śākyamuni)

Location
- Location: 8 Umegahata Toganō-chō, Ukyō-ku, Kyoto, Kyoto Prefecture
- Country: Japan
- Interactive map of Kōzan-ji 高山寺

Architecture
- Founder: Emperor Kōnin
- Completed: 774

Website
- http://www.kosanji.com/

Kōzan-ji (高山寺), officially Toganōsan Kōsan-ji (栂尾山高山寺), is a Buddhist temple of the Omuro sect of Shingon Buddhism in Umegahata Toganōchō, Ukyō Ward, Kyoto, Japan. Kōzan-ji is also known as Kōsan-ji and Toganō-dera. The temple was founded by the Shingon scholar and monk Myōe (1173–1232) and is renowned for its numerous national treasures and important cultural properties. The Chōjū-jinbutsu-giga, a group of ink paintings from the 12th and 13th centuries, are among the most important treasures of Kōzan-ji. The temple celebrates Biyakkōshin, Zenmyōshin and Kasuga Myōjin, as well as the temple's tutelary Shintō deity. In 1994, it was registered as part of the UNESCO World Heritage Site "Historic Monuments of Ancient Kyoto".

== History ==
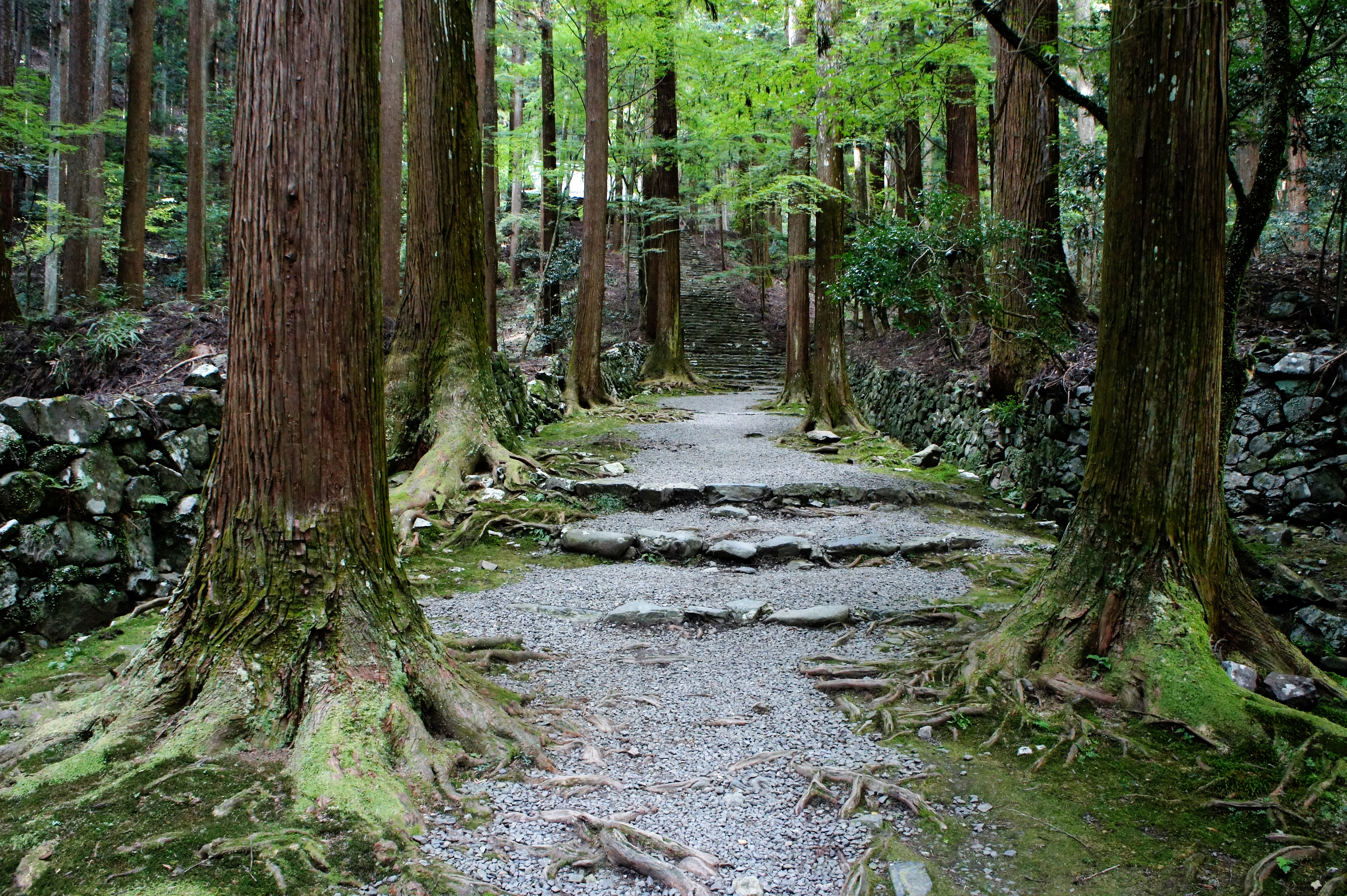
The path to the Golden Hall

Togano, located deep in the mountains behind Jingo-ji temple, which are famous for their autumn foliage, is considered an ideal location for mountain asceticism, and there have long been many small temples in this location. In addition to Kosan-ji, there have been other temples in the area, such as Toganoo-ji (度賀尾寺) and Toganoo-bō (都賀尾坊). According to legend, these were said to have been established by the imperial orders of Emperor Kōnin in 774, however, the accuracy of these claims is not clear.

In 1206, Myōe, a Kegon Buddhist priest who had been serving at nearby Jingo-ji, was granted the land to construct a temple by Emperor Go-Toba. He selected the name Hiidetemazukousanwoterasuyama-no-tera (日出先照高山之寺). The temple's name was taken from a line in the Avatamsaka sutra: "When the sun appears, it first casts its light upon the highest mountain." (日、出でて、まず高き山を照らす, hi, idete, mazu takakiyama wo terasu).

The temple has been destroyed numerous times by fire and war. The oldest extant building is Sekisui-in (石水院), which dates from the Kamakura period (1185–1333).

== Layout ==
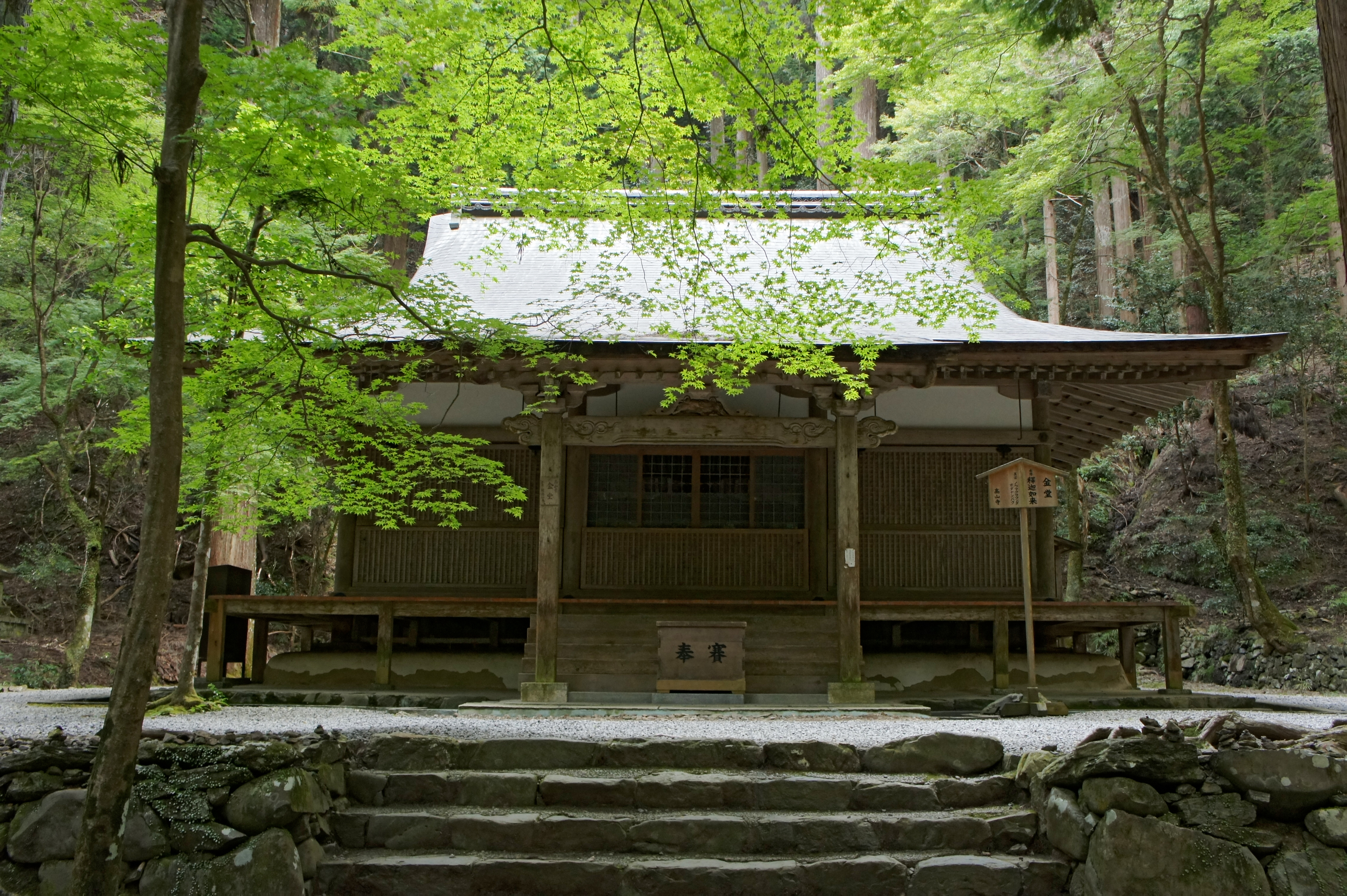
Golden Hall

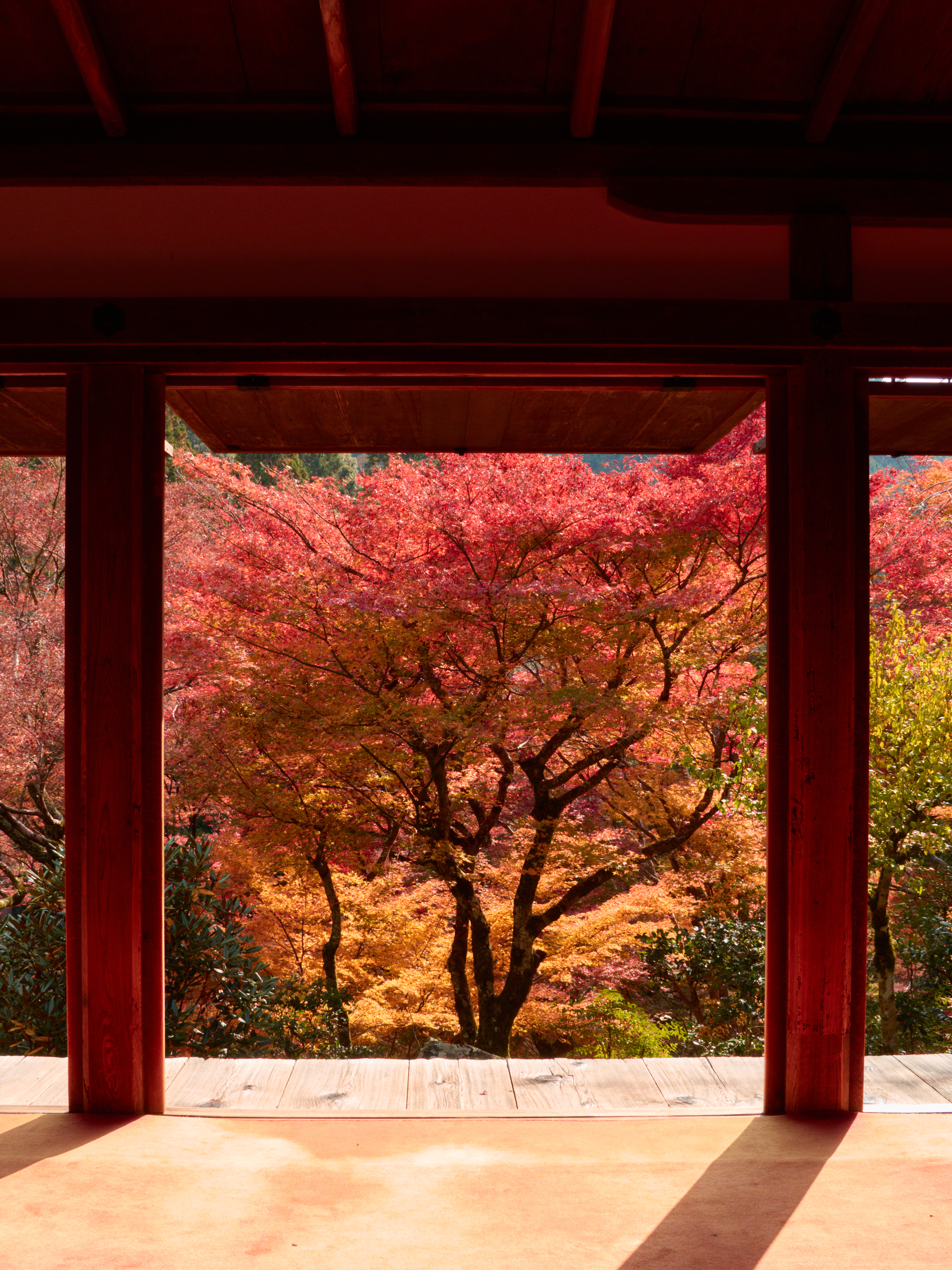
Autumn in Kozan-ji.

Jingo-ji houses a diagram of Kōzan-ji that was drawn in 1230, some 20 years after it was constructed. The diagram is registered as an important cultural property, because it shows the original layout of the temple. From the diagram, we know that Kōzan-ji originally consisted of a large gate, a main hall, a three-storied pagoda, a hall dedicated to Amitabha, a hall dedicated to Lohan, a bell tower, a scripture hall, and a Shinto shrine dedicated to the tutelary deity of the area. However, all of these buildings have since been destroyed, except for the scripture hall, which is now known as Sekisui-in.

In addition to Sekisui-in, today's Kōzan-ji also contains a main hall (originally part of Ninna-ji, relocated to Kōzan-ji) and a hall dedicated to the founding of the temple, which houses an important carved wooden bust of Myōe. Both of these buildings, however, are modern reconstructions.

== Cultural properties ==
The temple possesses numerous National Treasures and Important Cultural Properties, however, the majority of them are currently on loan to national museums in Kyoto and Tokyo.

=== National Treasures ===
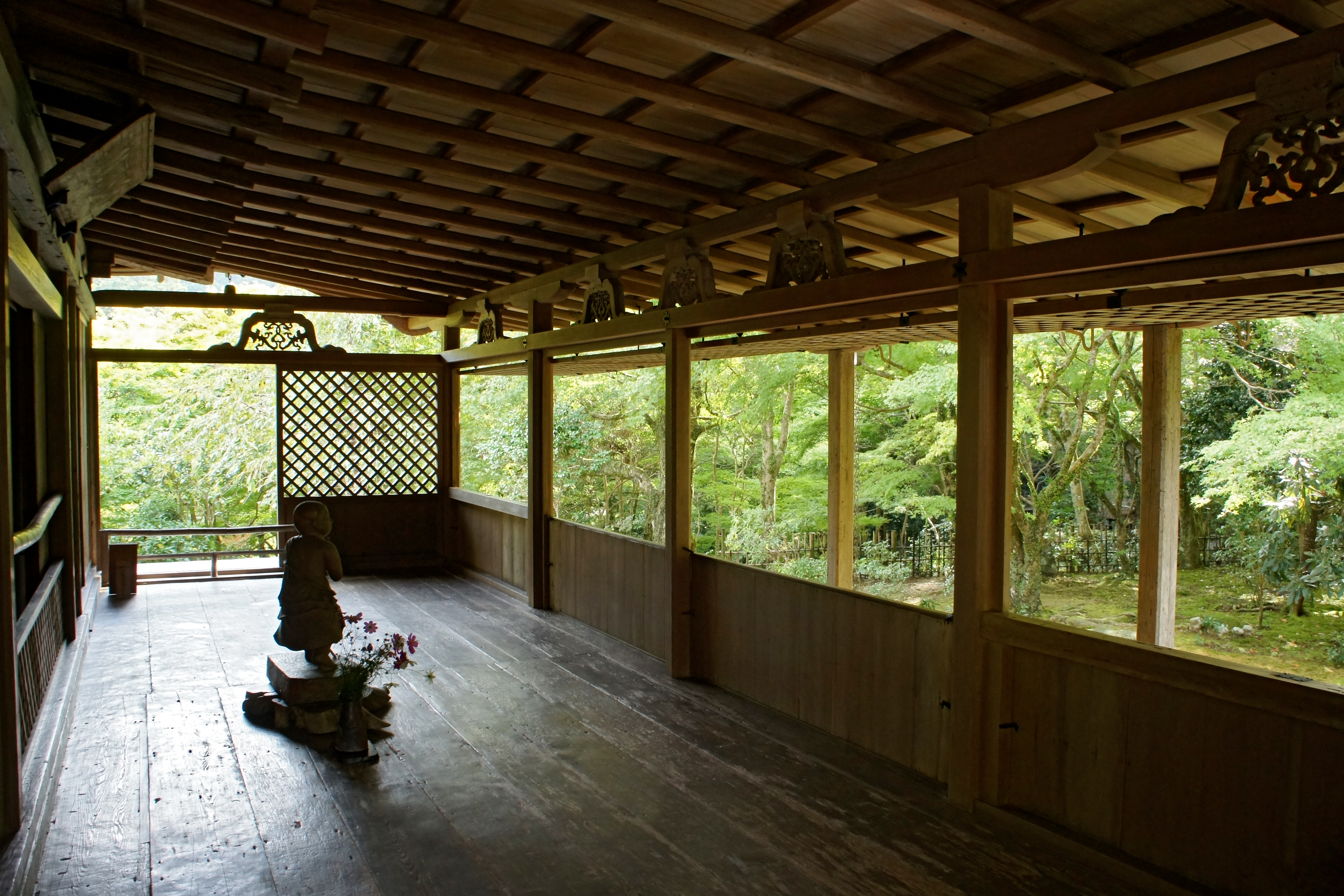
Sekisui-in

- Sekisui-in – Built in the Kamakura period. Irimoyazukuri style, with a gabled, hipped, shingled roof
- Chōjū-giga
- Kegon-shū Soshi Eden (華厳宗祖師絵伝) – created in the Kamakura period, this picture scroll portrays the lives of Korean Kegon founders Uisang and Wonhyo.
- Myōe Shōnin-zō (明恵上人像) – A portrait of Myōe also known as Jujō Zazen-zō (樹上座禅像) and created during the Kamakura period. In contrast to the standard image of a Buddhist monk, this picture features a tiny Myōe surrounded by mountains.
- Butsugen Butsumo-zō (仏眼仏母像) – A portrait created in the Kamakura period at the end of the 12th century
- Yupian (玉篇, gyokuhen) – a Tang period copy of a Chinese dictionary created during the Liang dynasty. This is the oldest Chinese character dictionary in Japan.
- Tenrei Banshō Meigi (篆隷万象名義) – valued as the only remaining copy of an old kanji dictionary compiled by Kūkai. It was copied in 1114.
- Meihō-ki (冥報記) – A Tang period manuscript of Buddhist tales. Now disappeared from China, this is the oldest extant copy of this work.

=== Important Cultural Properties ===
A large number of buildings, picture scrolls, carvings, furnishings and old writings have been registered as important cultural properties. The most significant among these include:

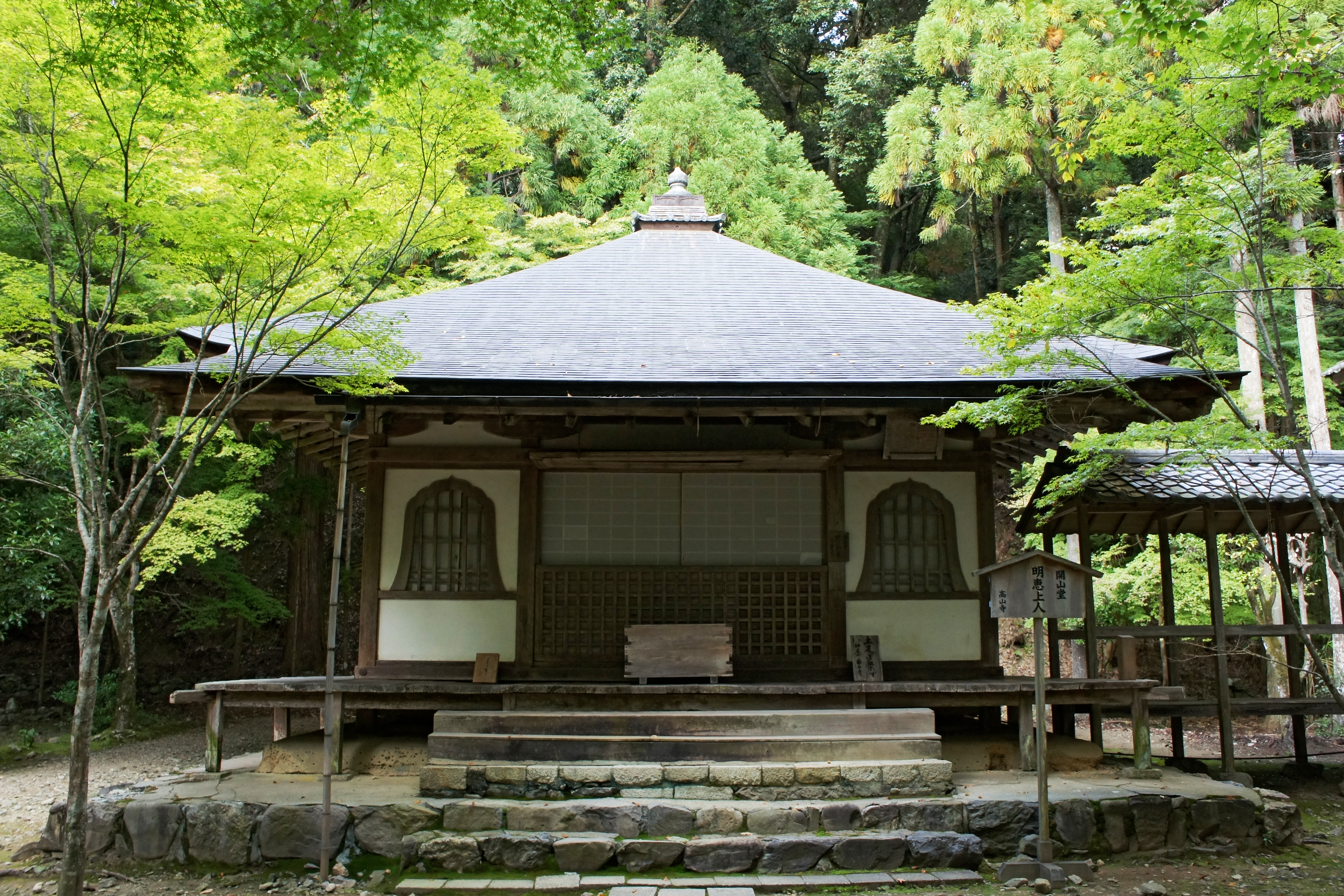
Founders Hall

- Founders Hall (Kaizandō)
- A lacquered wooden statue of Bhaisajyaguru in seated posture created towards the end of the Nara period. Originally the center of a sanzonzō (a trio of Buddhist statues with the primary image in the center and flanked by two attendants), the attendant images were removed during the Meiji period. The image of Suryaprabha now rests in the Tokyo National Museum, and the image of the Chandraprabha in the university museum of the Tokyo National University of Fine Arts and Music.
- A wooden statue of Myoe in sitting posture created in the Kamakura period and located in the hall dedicated to the founding of the temple
- A pair of wooden deer statues created in the Kamakura period. These statues, of a buck and a doe, were uniquely constructed to look like komainu, the lion statues that guard the entrance to a Shinto shrine. Deer are messengers of Kasuga Myōjin, the temple god, and as such, it is believed that these statues were placed in front of Kasuga Myōjin's altar.
- A statue of Byakkoshin in standing posture, constructed in the early Kamakura period. As the name indicates, the statue is painted white in its entirety—from its clothes to the pedestal. This is said to represent the snow of the Himalayas.
- A wooden statue of Zenmyōshin constructed in the early Kamakura period. Much of the vivid paint still remains, and this statue, along with Biyakkō-shin, is said to be the work of famed Buddhist sculptor Tankei.
- The Kōzan-ji document archive, which contains thousands of scriptures and records, some of which date back to the Heian period
- Kōben Yume-no-Ki (高弁夢記) – a record of Myōe's dreams from 1196 to 1223. His dreams are said to have exerted a great deal of influence on his religious thinking.

== See also ==
- Jingo-ji
- Kōsan-ji
- List of National Treasures of Japan (temples)
- List of National Treasures of Japan (paintings)
- List of National Treasures of Japan (writings)
