= Saibara =

Genre of Japanese court music

Saibara (催馬楽) is a genre of accompanied vocal Japanese court music that existed during the Heian period in the Nara and Kyoto regions. It draws from traditional folk music (fūzokuuta (風俗歌)) of the Nara period and is accompanied by togaku instruments, with the exception of the uchimono (打物; 'percussion instruments'), which are replaced by shakubyoshi (笏拍子), wooden sticks used for keeping rhythm.

== Development ==
It may have developed out of music to drive horses along, as the Chinese characters that compose its name seem to indicate but, according to German musicologist Eta Harich-Schneider, there are several other theories.

== Repertoire ==
About 55 pieces have been transcribed into modern Western notation from original 12th century sources by Elizabeth Markham. The few songs that have survived into modern times have changed over the centuries.

Song texts are short and simple in character and describe scenes of life. The repertoire was once estimated at some 400 songs.

In the late Nara period the aristocracy became more interested in complex foreign musical imports. Emperor Horikawa (1079-1107), despite the taste for Chinese culture since the Nara period, also cultivated an interest in fūzokuuta. Courtiers sang saibara songs for entertainment. A fashionable aristocrat was not regarded à jour if he did not know of the latest Chinese imports, such as toka music.

In the 14th century, because of the many wars, the repertoire of saibara declined, as many were lost due to the turmoil, and it was only at the crowning ceremony Daijōe (大嘗会) of emperor Emperor Go-Mizunoo, who ruled from 1611 to 1629, at Nijo Palace that a reconstruction of the old saibara pieces was attempted and the famous saibara piece "Ise no umi" was performed at the Imperial palace in Kyōto. The emperor's wife, Fujiwara no Fusahi, tells in her court chronicles how little old material could be found. The repertoire today includes newly created folk songs, imayōuta (今様歌; 'modern-style song').

== Text of 'Ise no Umi' (Sea of Ise) ==
Ise no umi no, kiyoki nagisa ni, shihogai ni, nanori zo yatsuma, kai ya hirowamu ya, tama ya hiro wa ya

('Near the sea at Ise we want to harvest sea-wheat, while we collect mussels and sea shells we collect pearls, I want to find one pearl.')
