= Yōmei Bunko =

Archive in Kyoto, Japan

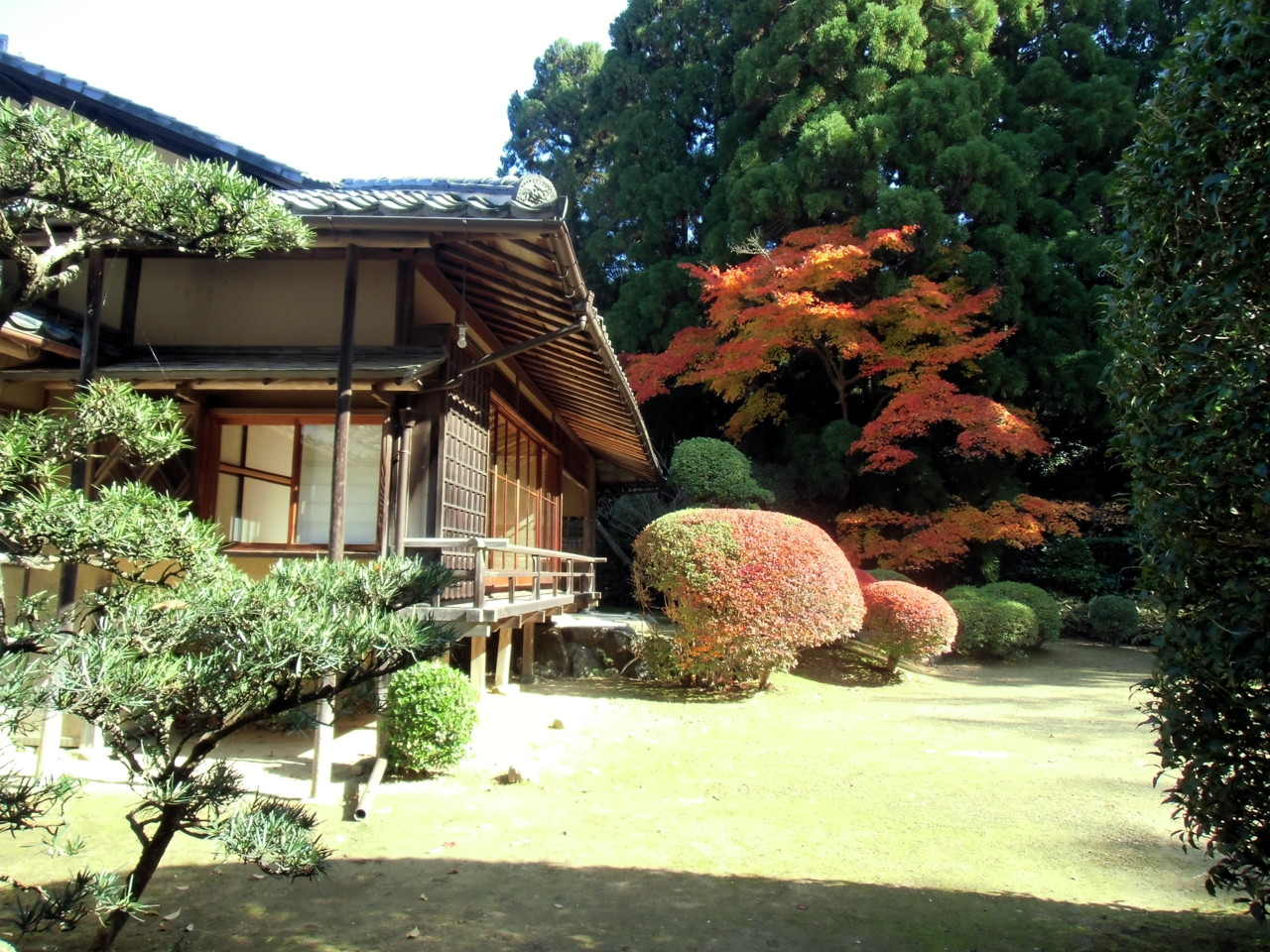
Yōmei Bunko Kozansō

Yōmei Bunko (陽明文庫), located in Utanokaminotanicho, Ukyō-ku, Kyoto, is a historical archive containing approximately 100,000 objects collected over the centuries by the Konoe family, the foremost of the five regent houses (go-sekke, 五摂家) of the imperial court nobility. The collection includes manuscripts, books, records, journals, letters, and antique works of art. In 1938, the Yōmei Bunko Foundation was established in its current location near Ninnaji Temple in northwest Kyoto by Fumimaro Konoe (近衛文麿, 1891 - 1945), then head of the family and prime minister of Japan. Materials preserved in the archive illustrate over 1,000 years of Japan's history, ranging from the "Midō Kanpaku-ki", the diary in his own hand of Fujiwara no Michinaga (藤原道長, 966 - 1028), one of the ancestors of the Konoe family, to 20th century materials relating to Fumimaro Konoe himself. The work of the archive includes making the collection available to researchers, conducting its own research, loaning items to exhibitions, and publishing facsimiles.

In April 2012, Yōmei Bunko changed its legal status to become a public interest incorporated foundation.

== The Konoe family and Yōmei Bunko ==
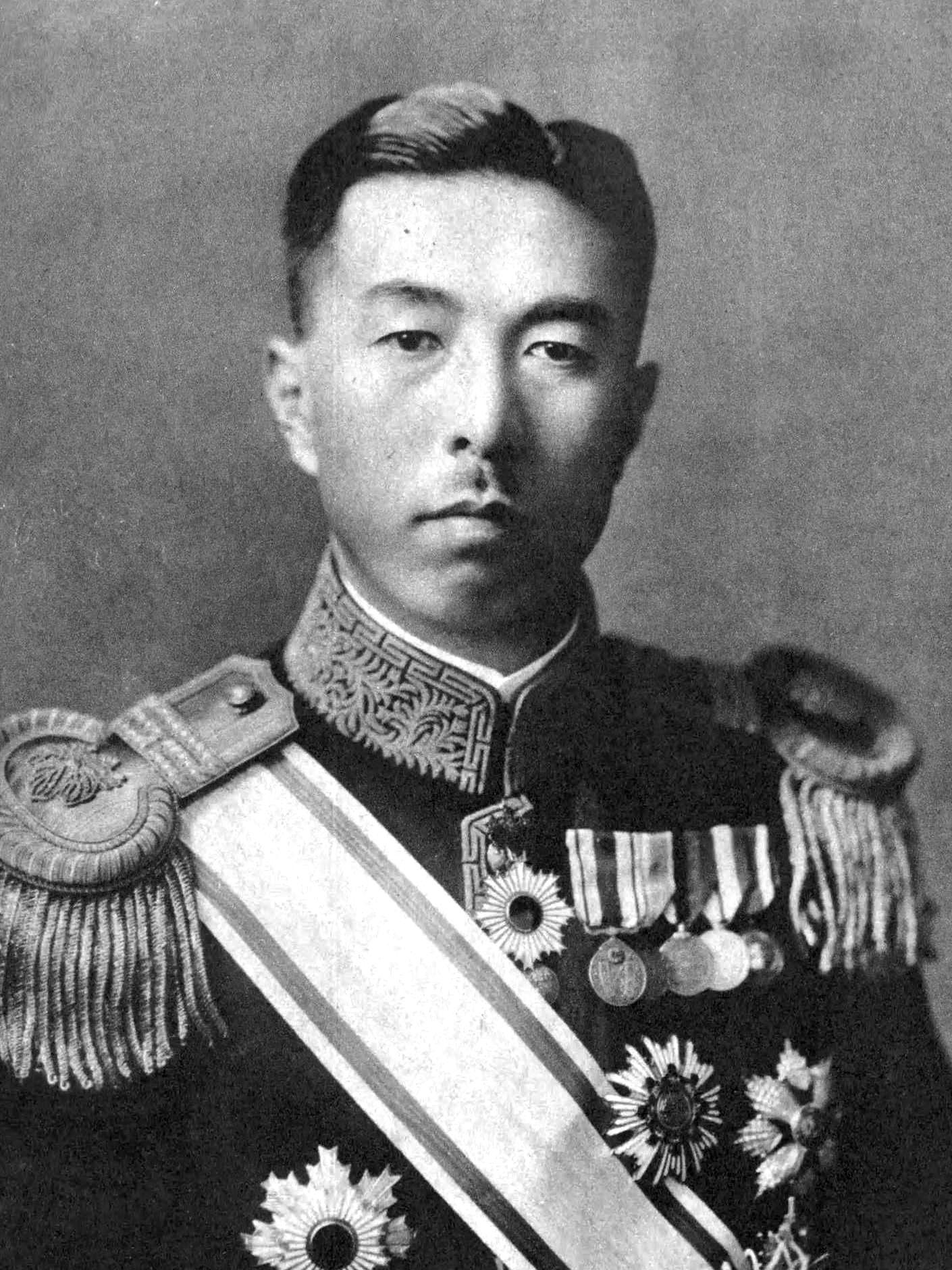
Konoe Fumimaro, founder of Yōmei Bunko

The Konoe family (近衛家) is a branch of the Northern Fujiwara (Fujiwara Hokke, 藤原北家). In the 12th century, the Fujiwara Clan monopolized the highest offices of state. Fujiwara no Tadamichi (藤原忠通, 1097 - 1164) served as sesshō (摂政, regent), kanpaku (関白, imperial advisor) and daijō-daijin (太政大臣, grand minister). The Konoe branch of the Fujiwara began with Tadamichi's eldest son, Konoe Motozane (近衛基実, 1143 - 1166). Tadamichi's third son, Kujō Kanezane (九条兼実, 1149 - 1207) founded the Kujō family (九条家). Later, the Takatsukasa (鷹司家) split from the Konoe, and the Nijō (二条家) and Ichijō (一条家) from the Kujō. These families would become known as the five regent houses.

Successive heads of the Konoe family preserved many important documents, from family diaries to records of imperial court rituals and ceremonies. These were men who occupied the highest offices of the land, often as sesshō or kanpaku, throughout the Heian period. Although they had no official authority after the Heian gave way to the Kamakura period, the Konoe family continued to retain great influence as a regent house, deeply involved with court ritual and ceremony. The commitment to preserving the family legacy of important records grew from this long history of leading roles in both government and at court.

From generation to generation, the heads of the Konoe family, themselves usually both highly cultured and artistically accomplished, continued to organize and add to the collection. The 13th head of the family, Konoe Masaie (近衛政家, 1445 – 1505), served as kanpaku and daijō-daijin during the upheavals of the Sengoku, or Warring States, period. During the Ōnin and Bunmei wars, he sent 50 boxes of the family records for safekeeping to Iwakura, on the northern outskirts of Kyoto. This ensured that, when the Konoe family mansion was burned down in the Ōnin War, the records survived. The 16th head of the family, Konoe Sakihisa (近衛前久, pen name 龍山, ryūzan, 1536 - 1612), was serving as kanpaku during the Honnō-ji Incident that led to the collapse of the Ashikaga shogunate and the ascendancy of the Tokugawa. As kanpaku, he went on to form an alliance with Uesugi Kenshin, taking part in campaigns fought in Echigo and Kanto provinces. Despite living through one of Japan's most chaotic periods, Sakihisa found time to devote himself to cultural pursuits, becoming not only a renowned calligrapher, but also the leading waka and renga poet of his day.

The 17th head of the family, Konoe Nobutada (近衛信尹, 1565 – 1614, in later life known as 三藐院, Sanmyakuin), was one of the Kan'ei Sanpitsu (寛永三筆, the "Three brushes of Kan’ei"), the pre-eminent calligraphers of the period. Nobutada had no heir, so he adopted his nephew Konoe Nobuhiro (近衛信尋, Ōzan (応山) 1599–1649), who was the fourth son of Emperor Go-Yōzei. Nobuhiro was also a man of high culture, notably skilled in calligraphy, tea ceremony, and renga poetry. In the mid Edo period, the 21st head of the family, Konoe Iehiro (近衛家熈, 1667 – 1736, pen name 予楽院, Yoraku-in) was also famed for his artistic accomplishments as calligrapher and tea master. Iehiro compiled the Ōtekagami, an album of outstanding works of calligraphy from all ages that is now a National Treasure, and also personally hand-copied a large number of old calligraphic masterpieces that are only known to us today through Iehiro's transcriptions.

On several occasions in modern times, beginning from 1900, this ancient family collection was entrusted to the Kyoto University Library (then the Kyoto Imperial University Library). Finally, Fumimaro Konoe, while serving as prime minister in the troubled times before and during the Second World War, decided to establish the Yōmei Bunko Foundation in 1938 as a permanent repository for his family's historical archive. The name Yōmei was taken from an alternative name for the Konoe family which derived from the Yōmeimon Gate, one of the 12 gates to the imperial palace outer grounds, inside which stood the old Konoe mansion.

The Yōmei Bunko occupies an approximately 8,550m^{2} site in the Rakusai district, close to Ninna-ji Temple. In addition to the original buildings, two repositories and a reading room/office building, the Sukiya style Kozansō was added in 1944. Important examples of Showa period architecture, these have all been registered as National Tangible Cultural Assets. Most of the grounds lie within one of Kyoto's Preservation Districts for Groups of Historic Buildings, and adjoining the site to the north is a 28,916m^{2} forested hilly area containing numerous ponds also destined for preservation as a protected environment and landscape.

The library collection contains many historical journals written by court nobility in addition to the Midō Kanpaku-ki diary of Fujiwara no Michinaga. There are letters written in their own hand by emperors and prominent historical figures, items related to court ceremonies and ritual, manuscripts relating ancient legends, and imperial poetry collections. In addition to being a valuable historical resource, the collection also represents a unique history of the art of calligraphy.

While many of the ancestral treasures of the old aristocratic and daimyō families were lost in the aftermath of the Second World War, this legacy of the Konoe family survived thanks to the timely establishment of the foundation, a fact that makes the collection even more uniquely valuable.

Exhibits are displayed in a room on the upper floor of the library, although as a rule this is not open to the general public without a letter of introduction. Facsimiles of major documents are regularly published in editions of the Yōmei Sōsho.

== Cultural properties ==
=== National treasures ===
- "Mido Kanpaku-ki" (Diary of Fujiwara no Michinaga) set of 26 handscrolls (14 original, 12 transcribed) Attachments: "Abstract of the Midō Regent’s Diary" 5 handscrolls, and "Catalog of the Midō Regent’s Calendar" 1 hanging scroll. The 14 original handscrolls of the Diary date from 998 (author age 33) to 1021 (age 55)
- "Go-Nijodono-ki" 30 handscrolls (1 original, 29 transcribed). Diary of the Regent Fujiwara no Moromichi (transcribed hand scrolls handed down in the Ichijō family)
- "Wakan Sho" 1 pair of handscrolls. Probably transcribed in the mid 11th century from the handscrolls of "Wakan Roei Shu" (Anthology of Japanese and Chinese Poems for Recitation)
- "Kagura Wagon Hifu" (Secret Kagura Music for Japanese Zither) 1 handscroll
- "Utaawase Jikkanpon" (Ten-Volume Anthology of Poetry Competitions, scroll No. 6), 1 handscroll. Attachment: "Catalog of Poetry Competitions" 1 handscroll
- "Ruiju Utaawase" (Twenty-Volume Collection of Poetry Competitions) 19 handscrolls
- "Segment of Kumano Poems" 3 hanging scrolls by Retired Emperor Gotoba (1201), Fujiwara no Ietaka (1200) and Jakuren (1200)
- "Otekagami" (Models of Exemplary Calligraphy) 2 albums (Album 1: 139 leaves, Album 2: 168 leaves)

=== Important cultural properties ===
==== Diaries by Konoe family heads ====
- "Chisokuin Kanpaku-ki" 22 albums. Diary of the Regent Fujiwara no Tadazane (1078–1162)
- "Inokuma Kanpaku-ki" 39 handscrolls (23 original, 16 transcribed). Diary of the Regent and Grand Minister Konoe Iezane (1179–1242)
- "Okanoya Kanpaku-ki" 7 handscrolls. Diary of the Regent and Grand Minister Konoe Kanetsune (1210–1259)
- "Shinshin-in Kanpaku-ki" 7 handscrolls (3 handscrolls in the form of calendars, 4 transcribed handscrolls). Diary of the Regent and Minister of the Left Konoe Motohira (1246–1268)
- "Goshin-in Kanpaku-ki" 49 handscrolls, with 1 catalog by Konoe Masaie. Diary of the Regent and Minister of the Left Konoe Michitsugu (1333–1387)
- "Ghokoinki" 3 handscrolls, 27 albums. Diary of the Regent and Grand Minister Konoe Masaie (1444–1505)
- "Kohojoji Kanpaku-ki" 21 albums. Diary of the Regent and Grand Minister, and 14th head of the family, Konoe Hisamichi (1472–1544)

==== Other diaries ====
- "Abstract of the Diary of Fujiwara no Morosuke" (including a note of September 21, 936). Diary of the Minister of Right Fujiwara no Morosuke (908–960)
- "Diary of Fujiwara no Tametaka" 3 handscrolls. Diary of Fujiwara no Tametaka (1070–1130)
- "Difu-ki" (transcription dated spring 1092). Diary of Fujiwara no Tamefusa (1049–1115)
- "Heihan-ki" 45 handscrolls (29 transcribed, 16 probably transcribed by Konoe Iehiro). Diary of Taira no Nobunori (112–1187)
- "Gumai-ki" 3 handscrolls (2 original, 1 transcribed). Diary of the Minister of the Left Sanjo Sanefusa (1147–1225)
- "Kikko-ki" (original manuscript of 1256). Diary of Middle Councillor Yoshida Tsunetoshi (1214–1276)
- "Gogumai-ki" (original manuscript of 1367). Diary of Sanjo Kintada (1324–1383)
- "Chuyu-ki" 44 handscrolls. Diary of the Minister of the Right Fujiwara no Munetada (1062 - 1141)
- "Abstract of Imperial Diaries of the Engi and Tenryaku Eras". Abstract of the Diaries of Emperor Daigo and Emperor Murakami
- "Heiki" (Diaries of the Taira family) 4 handscrolls by Taira no Chikanobu, 1 by Taira no Yukichika, 1 by Taira no Sadaie, 2 by Taira no Tomonobu, 2 by Taira no Tokinobu. Attachments: 1 new transcribed handscroll by Taira no Norikuni, and 2 new transcribed handscrolls by Taira no Tomonobu

==== Letters ====
- "Letter by Emperor Gofukakusa" (dated October 28)
- "Letter by Emperor Gokomatsu" (dated April 5)
- "Letter by Emperor Gosuzaku". Written in 1044 at the age of 36, presumably sent to the Regent Fujiwara no Yorimichi. One of only 2 existing manuscripts by Emperor Gosuzaku
- "Letter by Emperor Hanazono" (dated November 18)
- "Letter by Prince Son-en" (dated February 5)
- "Letter by Fujiwara no Tadamichi" – 3 pieces
- "Letter by Jien"
- "Letter by Myoe" (dated February 6)
- "Letter by Taira no Nobunori" (dated December 12)
- "Letter by Minamoto no Ienaga" (dated February 4 and 5)
- "Letter and reply, by Reizei Tamesuke and Madenokoji Nobufusa"

Tales and Poetry Anthologies

- "The Tale of Genji" (54 volumes)
- "Kokinshu" (Poems from the Anthology), 2 volumes, manuscript of Reizei Tamesuke Attachments: 1 Certification by Sanjonishi Kintada and 1 Certification by Emperor Gosai
- "Goshuisho" (Poems from the Anthology, Goshui), Volume 1, with a colophon of 1249
- "Rokujo-Saiin Utaawase" (Fragment from the Rokujo Saiin Poetry Competition), Nijo-gire version – 1 hanging scroll
- "Wakanroeishu" (Fragment from the Poem Anthology), Taga-gire version. Written by Fujiwara no Mototoshi in 1116. Originally a transcription of the Wakanroeishu on handscrolls. The written date and author can be identified from the colophon. This is very rare, so this manuscript is used as a reference work in the history of Japanese calligraphy.
- "Preface to a Poetry Competition by Fujiwara no Kanshi"
- "Ron-Shunju Utaawase" (Spring and Autumn Poetry Competition)
- "Preface to the Chrysanthemum Poetry Competition"
- "Hakushi Monju" (Four Fragments of the Xin Yuefu), Poetry by Bai Juyi – 3 leaves and 1 handscroll
- "Waka poetry scroll on the subject of weeping cherry trees by Emperor Komei" with a colophon of 1855

==== Legal documents ====
- "Abstract of law book" 3 volumes
- "Abstract of trial book" with a colophon of 1265

==== Music manuscripts ====
- "Kinkafu" (sheet music for koto), with a colophon of 981
- "Koyoshu" (Anthology of Old Songs), with a colophon of 1099
- "Music for five-stringed koto"

==== Records and manuscripts ====
- "Letters of resignation by Regent Konoe Iezane" 1 handscroll (8 letters)
- "Miscellaneous notes" 32 albums
- "Record of the domains of the Konoe family" with a colophon of 1454
- "Catalog of the records of the regent family" dated February 10, 1117
- "Genealogy of the regent family"
- "The Imperial Palace" manuscript of 1319. The oldest existing plan of the Imperial Palace. Includes costs paid by each province to construct residences in the Imperial Palace grounds, and records of destruction by fire. This is an important transcription of a manuscript by a vassal of the Kamakura Shogunate, illustrating relations between the samurai of Kamakura and the court nobles of Kyoto.
- "Carriages"

==== Miscellaneous ====
- "Diary of Dreams by Myoe"
- "Yusenkutsu" (Grotto of the Immortals, a novel by Zhang Wencheng), with a colophon by Enga dated 1389
- "Yogakushinansho" (old Japanese encyclopedia) volume 15, fragments of an unknown volume, 2 albums
- "Fuku Kensaku Shinju Shinkyo" (a sutra of esoteric Buddhism) copied by Fujiwara no Takaiko, dated May 7, 881

==== Art objects ====
- "Kasuga Deer Mandala" - Silk canvas
- "Tanto sword with mounting" Aikuchi type with cherry blossoms and stream design in makie on black lacquer ground, signed Yoshimitsu
- "Tachi sword with mounting" Itomakitachi type with chrysanthemum and paulownia crest design in makie on nashiji lacquer ground, signed Hidechika
- "Tachi sword with mounting" Itomakitachi type with hollyhock crest design in makie on nashiji lacquer ground, signed Nagamitsu
- "Tachi sword with mounting" Peony blossom design in makie on hirameji lacquer ground, signed Unsho
- "Kinuta celadon flower vase with phoenix handles" known as Sensei (1,000 voices) – China, Southern Song dynasty

== Access and information ==
Visits to the archive require a letter of reference from an accredited scholar or researcher.

Public exhibitions are held for three months in spring and autumn (limited to groups with reservations), from 10 am to 16 pm, closed Sundays and holidays.

Location and access:

Address: Utanokaminotanicho 1–2, Ukyo-ku, Kyoto

Access: Take the bus for Togano-o from Kyoto Station. Get off at the Fukuōji stop and it is only a few minutes walk.
