= Medieval Japanese literature =

Literature written during the Kamakura, Nanbokuchō and Muromachi periods in Japan

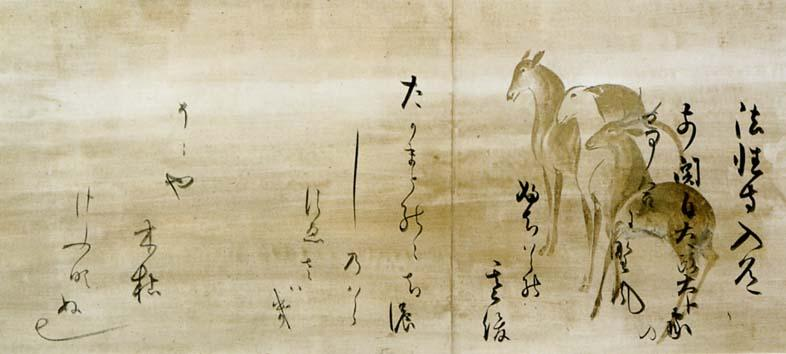
The Shin-kokin Wakashū poetry anthology, compiled in the early 13th century, is considered one of the pinnacles of waka poetry.

Japan's medieval period (the Kamakura, Nanbokuchō and Muromachi periods, and sometimes the Azuchi–Momoyama period) was a transitional period for the nation's literature. Kyoto ceased being the sole literary centre as important writers and readerships appeared throughout the country, and a wider variety of genres and literary forms developed accordingly, such as the gunki monogatari and otogi-zōshi prose narratives, and renga linked verse, as well as various theatrical forms such as noh. Medieval Japanese literature can be broadly divided into two periods: the early and late middle ages, the former lasting roughly 150 years from the late 12th to the mid-14th century, and the latter until the end of the 16th century.

The early middle ages saw a continuation of the literary trends of the classical period, with court fiction (monogatari) continuing to be written, and composition of waka poetry reaching new heights in the age of the Shin-kokin Wakashū, an anthology compiled by Fujiwara no Teika and others on the order of Emperor Go-Toba. One new genre of that emerged in this period was the gunki monogatari, or war tale, of which the representative example of The Tale of the Heike, a dramatic retelling of the events of the wars between the Minamoto and Taira clans. Apart from these heroic tales, several other historical and quasi-historical works were produced in this period, including Mizu Kagami and the Gukanshō. Essays called zuihitsu came to prominence with Hōjōki by Kamo no Chōmei and Tsurezuregusa by Kenkō. Japanese Buddhism also underwent a reform during this period, with several important new sects being established, with the founders of these sects—most famously Dōgen, Shinran, and Nichiren—writing numerous treatises expounding their interpretation of Buddhist doctrine. Writing in classical Chinese, with varying degrees of literary merit and varying degrees of direct influence from literature composed on the continent, continued to be a facet of Japanese literature as it had been since Japanese literature's beginnings [ja].

The late middle ages saw further shifts in literary trends. Gunki monogatari remained popular, with such famous works as the Taiheiki and the Soga Monogatari appearing, reflecting the chaotic civil war the country was experiencing at the time. The courtly fiction of early eras gave way to the otogi-zōshi, which were broader in theme and popular appeal but generally much shorter in length. Waka composition, which had already been in stagnation since the Shin-kokin Wakashū, continued to decline, but this gave way to new poetic forms such as renga and its variant haikai no renga (a forerunner to the later haiku). The performing arts flourished during the late medieval period, the noh theatre and its more informal cousin kyōgen being the best-known genres. Folk songs and religious and secular tales were collects in a number of anthologies, and travel literature, which had been growing in popularity throughout the medieval period, became more and more commonplace. During the late 16th century, Christian missionaries and their Japanese converts produced the first Japanese translations of European works. Isoho Monogatari, a translation of Aesop's Fables, remained in circulation even after the country largely closed itself off to the west during the Edo period.

== Overview ==
Minamoto no Yoritomo (1147–1199) ushered in Japan's medieval period with his establishment of a military government in eastern Japan.

Japan's medieval period lasted roughly 400 years, from Minamoto no Yoritomo's establishment of the Kamakura shogunate and being named shōgun in the third year of the Kenkyū era (1192) to Tokugawa Ieyasu's establishment of the Edo shogunate in Keichō 8 (1603) following the Battle of Sekigahara in 1600 that began the Edo period. This period, based on the centres of political power, is normally divided into the Kamakura, Nanbokuchō (or Yoshino), Muromachi and Azuchi–Momoyama periods, and is also referred to simply as the Kamakura-Muromachi period. The start date of this period has also been taken as being around 1156 (the Hōgen rebellion) or 1221 (the Jōkyū rebellion), with the Azuchi–Momoyama period also sometimes being taken as part of the early modern period, with the medieval period ending at Oda Nobunaga's entry to the capital in Eiroku 11 (1568) or the end of the Ashikaga regime in Tenshō 1 (1573).

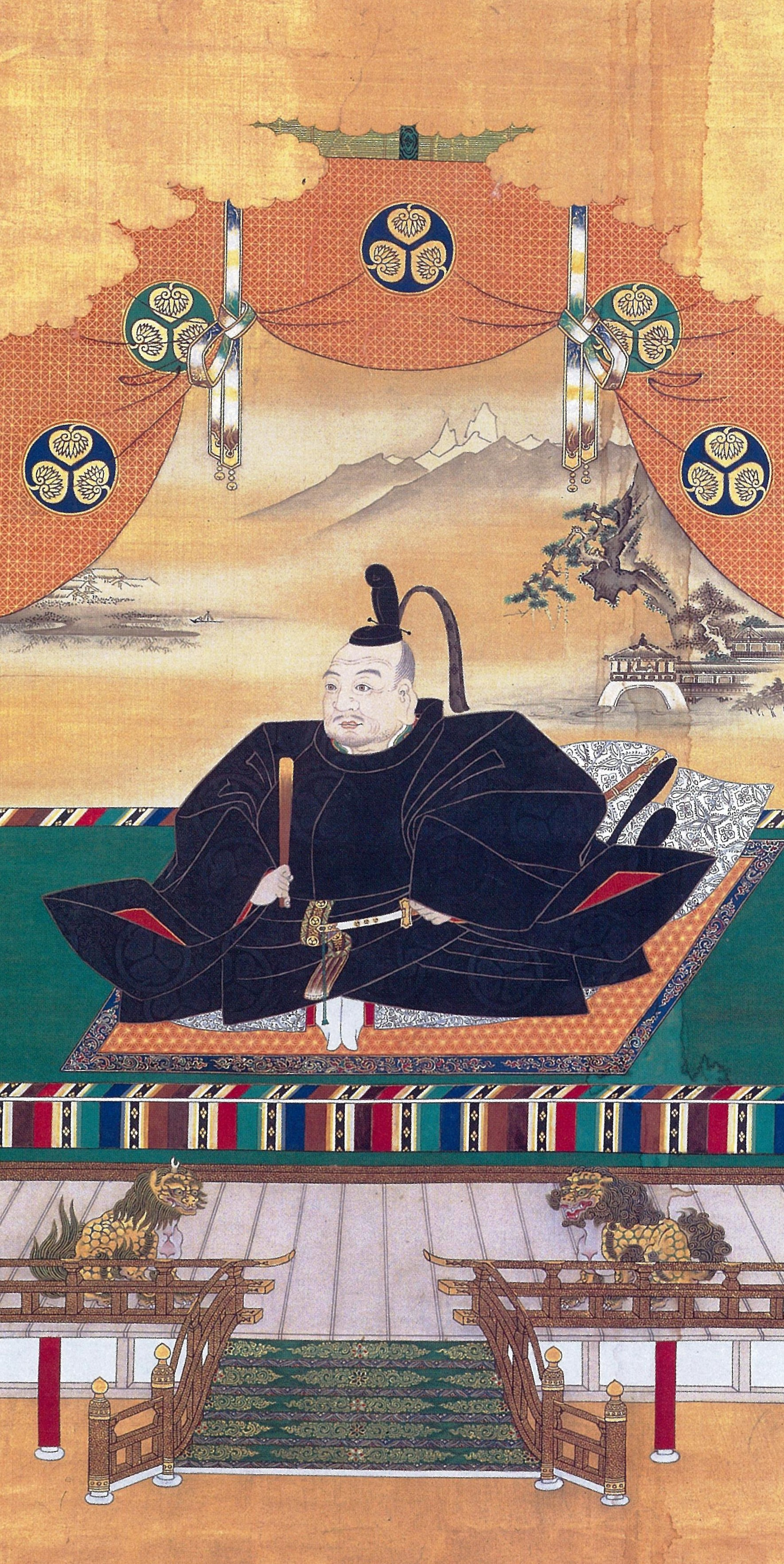
The establishment of the Edo shogunate by Tokugawa Ieyasu (1543–1616) is usually taken as the end of Japan's medieval period and the beginning of the early modern period.

The period is characterized by war, beginning with the Genpei War and ending with the Battle of Sekigahara, with other conflicts such as the Jōkyū rebellion, the war between the northern and southern courts and the Ōnin War (1467–1477), culminating in the entire country erupting in war during the Sengoku period. The social order was disrupted as a result of these conflicts, with changes to society in general and, naturally, shifts in literary styles and tastes. The philosophy of impermanence (無常 mujō) became pervasive, with many seeking salvation, both physical and spiritual, in religion, specifically Buddhism.

=== Aesthetic ideals ===
The basic ideal that informed aesthetic tastes in this period is known as yūgen (roughly meaning "mystery" or "depth"), along with other concepts such as ushin (有心, literally "possessing heart", the more "weighty" or "serious" poetry, as opposed to games) and yōen (妖艶, literally "ethereal beauty"). These ideals shunned realism, representing a spirit of l'art pour l'art and aiming to plunge the reader into an "ideal" world, and were in accord with the ideals of Buddhist monastic seclusion (出家遁世 shukke-tonsei). What exactly constituted yūgen differed throughout its history, and the various literary genres it influenced include waka ("Japanese poetry", meaning poetry in vernacular Japanese, typically in a 5-7-5-7-7 metre), renga ("linked verse") and the noh theatre.

Later developments include en (艶, literally "lustre" or "polish"), hie (ひえ) and sabi (roughly "stillness" or "attenuation"), connecting to the literature of Japan's early modern period. Translator and literary historian Donald Keene discusses both yūgen and hie (which he translated "chill") as concepts shared by the quintessentially medieval art forms of renga and noh. He describes sabi as having been "used to suggest the unobtrusive, unassertive beauty that was the ideal of Japanese poets, especially during the turbulent decades of the Japanese middle ages", and states that it first came to prominence around the time of the Shin-kokin Wakashū.

There was, however, a concurrent trend toward a form of realism in medieval developments on the concept of okashi (をかし; "bright", "happy", "charming", "humorous" or "brilliant"). Authors began to attempt to reflect reality in order satirize social conditions, or for simple enjoyment.

=== Authors and readership ===
Medieval Japanese literature is most often associated with members of the warrior class, religious figures and hermits (隠者 inja), but the nobility maintained a degree of their former prestige and occupied an important position in literary circles. This was especially true in the early middle ages (i.e., the Kamakura period), when court literature still carried the high pedigree of earlier eras, while monks, recluses and warriors took an increasingly prominent role in later centuries. Furthermore, at the very end of the medieval period (i.e., the Azuchi–Momoyama period), urban (chōnin) literature began to appear. As a result, the medieval period was the time when the literature of the nobility became a truly "national" Japanese literature.

Developments in the performing arts allowed for large groups of people to appreciate literature on a broader level than before. As the social classes that had previously supported the arts fell away, new groups stepped in as both creators and audiences for literary works. These conditions encouraged the growth of a literature that was more visual and auditory than the literature of Japanese classical period. This is true of performing arts like noh and traditional dance, but also includes such genres as the emakimono, picture scrolls that combined words and images, and e-toki, which conveyed tales and Buddhist parables via images.

The centre of culture continued to be the capital in Kyoto, but other areas such as Ise and Kamakura became increasingly prominent as literary centres.

== Literature of the early medieval period ==
=== Historical background of the early medieval period ===
The early medieval period covers the time between the establishment of the Kamakura shogunate and the shogunate's collapse roughly 140 years later in Genkō 3 (1333). With the shogunate, who were of warrior stock, controlling the affairs of state in eastern Japan, the aristocracy of the Heian court continued to perform limited court functions and attempted to preserve their aristocratic literary traditions. The first two or three decades, which are also known as the Shin-kokin period, saw a surge in interest in waka composition and attempts to revive the traditions of the past. However, with the failure of the Jōkyū rebellion and Emperor Go-Toba's exile to Oki Island, the court lost almost all power, and the nobility became increasingly nostalgic, with the aristocratic literature of the later Kamakura period reflecting this.

As the warrior class was in its ascendancy, their cultural and philosophical traditions began to influence not only political but also literary developments, and while literature had been previously the exclusive domain of the court this period saw a growth in the literature of other levels of society. Narrative works such as The Tale of the Heike are an example of this new literature.

Buddhism was also in its heyday during this period, with new sects such as Jōdo-shū, Nichiren-shū and Zen-shū being established, and both old and new sects fervently spreading their influence among the populace throughout the country. In addition to Buddhist literature such as hōgo, the monks of this period were especially active in all manner of literary pursuits. Those who became hermits upon entering Buddhism produced a new kind of work, the zuihitsu or "essay", as well as fine examples of setsuwa ("tale") literature. Such literature is known as hermit literature (隠者文学 inja-bungaku) or "thatched-hut literature" (草庵文学 sōan-bungaku).

Overall, the literature of this period showed a strong tendency to combine the new with the old, mixing the culture of aristocrats, warriors and Buddhist monks.

=== Early medieval waka ===
The waka genre of poetry saw an unprecedented level of exuberance at the beginning of the Kamakura period, with Emperor Go-Toba reopening the Waka-dokoro in Kennin 1 (1201). Notable, and prolific, poets at the highest levels of the aristocracy included Fujiwara no Yoshitsune and his uncle, the Tendai abbot Jien. At both the palace and the homes of various aristocrats, poetry gatherings (uta-kai) and competitions (uta-awase) such as the famous Roppyaku-ban Uta-awase and Sengohyaku-ban Uta-awase were held, with numerous great poets coming to the fore. On Go-Toba's command, Fujiwara no Teika, Fujiwara no Ietaka and others compiled a new chokusenshū (imperial waka anthology), the Shin-kokin Wakashū, which was seen as a continuation of the grand waka tradition begun three hundred years earlier with the Kokin Wakashū. Teiji Ichiko, in his article on medieval literature for the Nihon Koten Bungaku Daijiten, calls this the final flowering of the aristocratic literature, noting its high literary value with its basis in the literary ideals of yūgen and yūshin, its emphasis on suggestiveness, and its exquisite delicacy.

The foundations for this style of poetry were laid by Teika and his father Shunzei, not just in their poetry but in their highly regarded works of poetic theory (karon and kagaku-sho). These include Shunzei's Korai Fūtei-shō (also valuable as an exploration of the history of waka) and Teika's Maigetsu-shō and Kindai Shūka (近代秀歌). Such works had a tremendous influence on later waka poets, and their philosophy of fūtei (風体, "style") has had value for Japanese aesthetics and art generally. Other works of poetic theory include those that are noted for their recording of various anecdotes about waka poets, including Kamo no Chōmei's Mumyō-shō.

This flourishing was characteristic of the first three or four decades of the Kamakura period, but following the Jōkyū rebellion and the exile of Go-Toba, the great patron of waka, the genre went into decline. Teika's son, Fujiwara no Tameie, championed simplicity in waka composition, writing the karon work Eiga no Ittei. In the generation following Tameie, the waka world became divided between schools represented by the three great houses founded by Tameie's sons: Nijō, Kyōgoku and Reizei. The conservative Nijō school, founded by Tameie's eldest son, was the most powerful, and with the different schools supporting different political factions (namely the Daikakuji-tō and the Jimyōin-tō), there was less emphasis on poetic innovation than on in-fighting, and the genre stagnated.

The compilation of imperial anthologies, though, actually became more frequent than before, with a ninth anthology, the Shin-chokusen Wakashū, and continuing on regularly over the following century until the sixteenth, the Shoku-goshūi Wakashū. Of these eight, the only one that was compiled by a member of the Kyōgoku school was the Gyokuyō Wakashū, compiled by Kyōgoku Tamekane, and this is considered the second best of the Kamakura anthologies after the Shin-kokin Wakashū. Every other collection was compiled by a Nijō poet, and according to Ichiko there is little of value in them. However, in eastern Japan the third shōgun, Minamoto no Sanetomo, a student of Teika's, showed great poetic skill in his personal anthology, the Kinkai Wakashū, which shows the influence of the much earlier poetry of the Man'yōshū.

Overall, while poetic composition at court floundered during the Kamakura period, the courtiers continued the act of collecting and categorizing the poems of earlier eras, with such compilations as the Fuboku Waka-shō and the Mandai Wakashū (万代和歌集) epitomizing this nostalgic tendency.

=== Monogatari ===
Works of courtly fiction, or monogatari (literally "tales"), continued to be produced by the aristocracy from the Heian period into the Kamakura period, with the early Kamakura work Mumyō-zōshi, written by a devout fan of monogatari, particularly The Tale of Genji, emphasizing literary criticism and discussing various monogatari, as well as waka anthologies and other works by the court ladies. The work praises Genji and then goes on to discuss various works of courtly fiction in roughly chronological order, and is not only the sole work of such literary criticism to survive from this period but is also valuable for detailing the history of the genre.

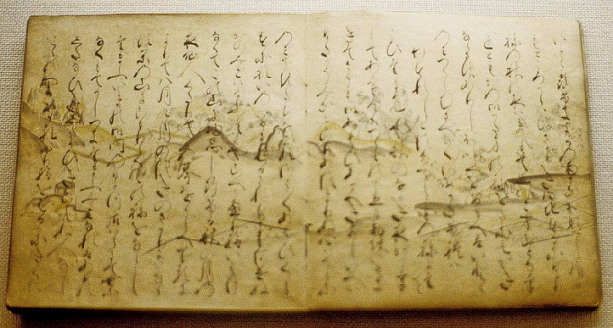
Matsuranomiya Monogatari is the one surviving work of prose fiction by Fujiwara no Teika, the greatest poet of the age.

The Fūyō Wakashū is a slightly later work that collects the waka poetry that was included in courtly fiction up to around Bun'ei 8 (1271). This work was compiled on the order of Emperor Kameyama's mother Ōmiya-in (the daughter of Saionji Saneuji), and shows not only the high place courtly fiction had attained in the tastes of the aristocracy by this time, but the reflective/critical bent with which the genre had come to be addressed in its final years. Well over a hundred monogatari appear to have been in circulation at this time, but almost all are lost. Fewer than twenty survive, and of the surviving works, several such as Sumiyoshi Monogatari, Matsuranomiya Monogatari and Iwashimizu Monogatari (石清水物語) have unusual contents. Other extant monogatari of this period include Iwade Shinobu, Wagami ni Tadoru Himegimi, Koke no Koromo and Ama no Karumo (海人の刈藻).

Late Kamakura works of courtly fiction include Koiji Yukashiki Taishō, Sayo-goromo and Hyōbu-kyō Monogatari, and these works in particular show a very strong influence from earlier works, in particular The Tale of Genji, in terms of structure and language. Long works of courtly fiction at this time were almost all giko monogatari ("pseudo-archaic" tales, works imitative of past monogatari), and production of them largely ceased during the Nanbokuchō period.

=== Early medieval rekishi monogatari and historical works ===
Works that continued the tradition of Heian rekishi monogatari ("historical tales") such as Ōkagami ("The Great Mirror") and Ima Kagami ("The New Mirror") were written during this period. Mizu Kagami ("The Water Mirror"), for example, recounts the history of Japan between the reigns of Emperor Jinmu and Emperor Ninmyō, based on historical works such as the Fusō Ryakuki. Akitsushima Monogatari (秋津島物語) attempted to recount events before Jinmu, in the age of the gods.

More serious historical works composed during this period include the Gukanshō, which describes the period between Emperor Jinmu and Emperor Juntoku. It also attempted to describe the reasons for historical events and the lessons to be learned from them, and unlike the historical romances being produced at court that reflected nostalgically on the past, the Gukanshō used history as a way to criticize present society and provide guidance for the future. It is also noteworthy for its simple, direct language, which was a new innovation of this period.

=== Early medieval gunki monogatari ===
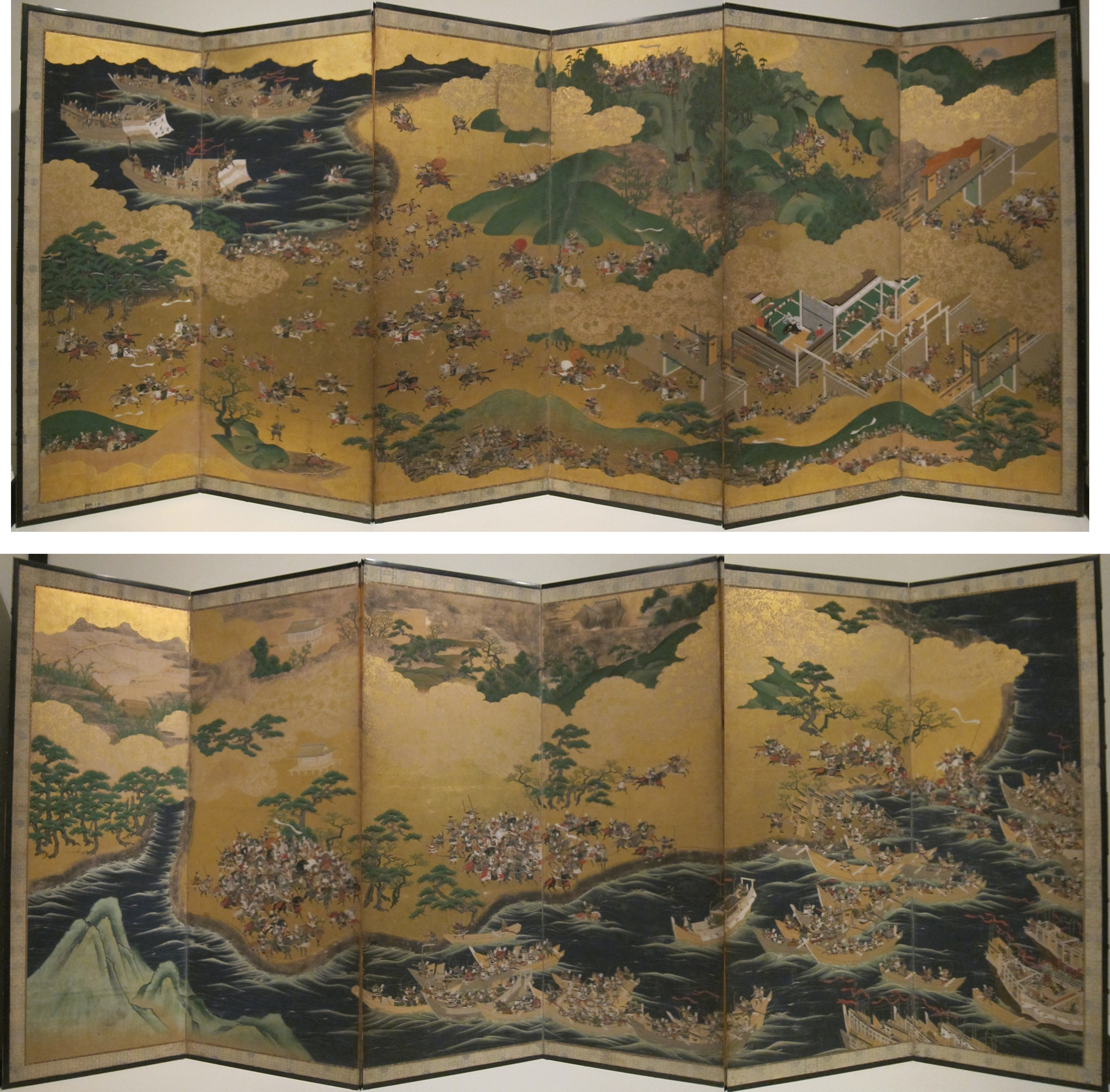
A 17th-century folding screen depicting scenes front The Tale of the Heike

The historical and court romances were a continuation of the works of the Heian period, but a new genre that built upon the foundations laid by these emerged in the Kamakura period: the gunki monogatari (warrior tale), which is also known as simply gunki, or senki monogatari. The immediate predecessors of these works were kanbun chronicles composed in the Heian era such as the Shōmonki and Mutsu Waki, as well as warrior tales included in the Konjaku Monogatari-shū.

The gunki monogatari emerged in the early medieval era as a form of popular entertainment, with the most important early works being the Hōgen Monogatari, the Heiji Monogatari, and The Tale of the Heike. These three recounted, in order, the three major conflicts that led to the rise of the warrior class at the end of the Heian period. They were composed in wakan konkō-bun, a form of literary Japanese that combined the yamato-kotoba of the court romances with Chinese elements, and described fierce battles in the style of epic poetry. They portrayed strong characters proactively and forcefully, in a manner that Ichiko describes as appropriate for the age of the warrior class's ascendancy. The Heike in particular was widely recited by biwa-hōshi, travelling monks, usually blind, who recited the tale to the accompaniment of the biwa, and this was a very popular form of entertainment throughout the country all through the middle ages.

The authors of these works are largely unknown, but they were frequently adapted to meet the tastes of their audiences, with court literati, Buddhist hermits, and artists of the lower classes all likely having a hand in their formation. There are, consequently, a very large number of variant texts. In addition to the largely unprecedented manner in which these works were formed, they led to the rise of the heikyoku style of musical accompaniment.

Following these three, the Jōkyū-ki, which recounted the events of the Jōkyū rebellion, was also compiled. Together, the four are known as the Shibu Gassen-jō (四部合戦状). The Soga Monogatari, which was composed toward the end of this period, placed its focus on heroic figures, and laid the foundations for the gunki monogatari of the Muromachi period.

Some gunki monogatari in this period took the form of picture scrolls.

=== Early medieval setsuwa literature ===
Similarly to new the innovations in the collection and categorization of waka poetry in the Kamakura period, the period saw an upswing in the compilation and editing of setsuwa, or short tales and parables. This included aristocratic collections such as the Kokon Chomonjū, the Kojidan and the Ima Monogatari, as well as the Uji Shūi Monogatari, which also incorporates stories of commoners. Other works targeted at members of the newly ascendant warrior class had a stronger emphasis on disciplined learning and Confucianism, as exemplified in the Jikkinshō.

Buddhist setsuwa works were meant to provide resources for sermons, and these included the Hōbutsu-shū of Taira no Yasuyori and Kamo no Chōmei's Hosshin-shū, the Senjū-shō and Shiju Hyakuin Nenshū (私聚百因縁集). Of particular note are the works of monk and compiler Mujū Dōgyō, such as Shaseki-shū and Zōdan-shū (雑談集), which mix fascinating anecdotes of everyday individuals in with Buddhist sermons.

These setsuwa collections, like those of earlier eras, compile tales of Buddhist miracles and the nobility, but works like the Kara Monogatari also incorporate tales and anecdotes from China, and some include tales of commoners, showing a change in tastes in this new era.

Some works describe the origins of Buddhist temples and Shinto shrines and collect tales of miracles. Such works include the Kasuga Gongen Genki and the Kokawa-dera Engi Emaki, both of which are emakimono that combine words and images. These are a development of the earlier engi that were written in kanbun, but Ichiko classifies them as a form of setsuwa.

=== Early medieval diaries, travel literature and essays ===
Ladies at court continued to write diaries as they had during the Heian period, with important examples including Nakatsukasa no Naishi Nikki and Ben no Naishi Nikki. Of particular interest are diaries written by women who became nyoin (court ladies) during the Taira ascendancy such as Kenshun-mon'in Chūnagon Nikki and Kenrei-mon'in Ukyō no Daibu Shū, which provide a glimpse of life behind the scenes at the palace. The latter in particular, written by Kenrei-mon'in Ukyō no Daibu who had come to court to serve Kenrei-mon'in, is focused primarily on poetry that conveys her sadness and lamentation, following the downfall of the Taira clan in warfare, which shows a character quite different from the ladies' diaries of the Heian period. Towazu-gatari, a work by Go-Fukakusain no Nijō, combines reflections on her time serving at court with a travelogue. It provides a bare-faced look at the inner thoughts and desires of its author, which is rare for a work written by a woman of this period, causing Ichiko to compare it to the I novel.

Literary diaries written in Japanese by men, such as Asukai Masaari's Haru no Miyamaji (はるのみやまぢ, also known as 飛鳥井雅有日記 Asukai Masaari Nikki) began to appear. The tradition of kanbun-nikki (diaries in classical Chinese) used to record the day-to-day lives of the nobility also continued, of which Teika's Meigetsuki is the best-known example.

Because of the biregional nature of government in this period, with the court in Kyoto and the shogunate in Kamakura, works describing the journey along the Tōkaidō between Kyoto and Kamakura, such as Kaidōki, Tōkan Kikō, and the nun Abutsu's Izayoi Nikki began to appear en masse. Kaidōki and Tōkan Kikō were written by highly educated men in wakan konkō-bun.

Takakura-in Itsukushima Gokōki (高倉院厳島御幸記) is one important example of the growing subgenre of travelogues describing pilgrimages to shrines and temples. Ryūben Hōin Saijōki (隆弁法印西上記) recounts the Tsurugaoka Hachimangū bettō Ryūben's journey to Onjō-ji and the time he spent there. It was likely composed by one of Ryūben's travelling companions, and is noteworthy partly for its unusual gaps in describing the journey, and for its frank portrayal of the perversity of the monks.

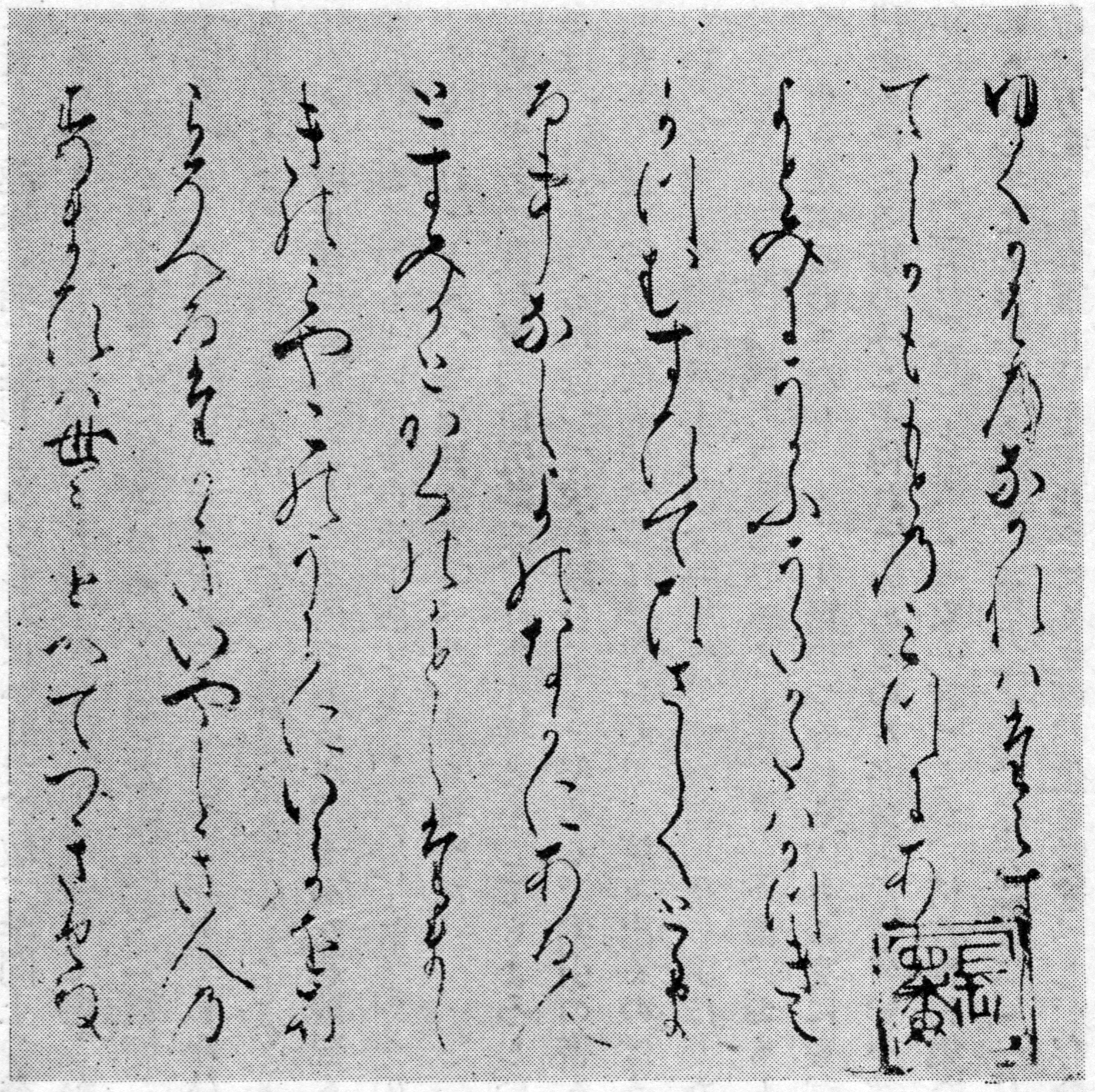
The essay, represented by Kamo no Chōmei's Hōjōki, rose to prominence in this period.

Works discussing the rejection of the material world, beginning with Saigyō at the end of the previous era, continued to be composed in the Kamakura period. These works combined poetry describing the recluse life in thatched-hut retreats with magnificent essays called zuihitsu. The most important examples are Kamo no Chōmei's Hōjōki and Kenkō's Tsurezuregusa which were written around the very end of the Kamakura period and the beginning of the Nanbokuchō period. The former describes its author's journey toward giving up the world, social changes, and celebrates recluse life, while the latter is a work of instruction detailing its author's inner thoughts and feelings as he lives in quiet seclusion. Along with the classical Pillow Book, they are considered the archetypal Japanese zuihitsu.

=== Buddhist literature and songs ===
While many of the works described above have Buddhist themes, "Buddhist literature" here refers to a combination the writings of great monks of the various Japanese Buddhist sects and the collections of their sayings that were produced by their followers. These include:

- Dōgen's Shōbō Genzō and Shōbōgenzō Zuimonki, the latter of which was recorded by his disciple, Koun Ejō;
- Mattōshō (末灯鈔), which collected the writings of Shinran, and Tannishō, a compilation of his teachings;
- Nichiren's Kaimokushō and other works.

Many of these Buddhist writings, or hōgo, expound on deep philosophical principles, or explain the basics of Buddhism in a simple manner that could easily be digested by the uneducated masses.

In addition to the continued production of imayō, sōka (早歌) were created in large numbers, and their lyrics survive in textual form. Buddhist songs were performed as part of ennen, etc., and of particular note is the wasan form. Many of these wasan were supposedly created by Buddhist masters of the Heian period, but the form became prominent in the Kamakura period. These songs were composed with the goal of educating people about Buddhism, and were widely recited around the country. Ichiko writes that the songs themselves are moving, but that Shinran's Sanjō Wasan and later songs were particularly brilliant works of Buddhist literature.

Furthermore, engi associated with famous temples, and illustrated biographies of Japanese Buddhist saints such as Kōya-daishi Gyōjō Zue (高野大師行状図絵), Hōnen-shōnin Eden (法然上人絵伝), Shinran-shōnin Eden (親鸞上人絵伝), Ippen-shōnin Eden, continued to be produced during the Kamakura period and well into the Nanbokuchō period. Ichiko categorizes these as examples of the Buddhist literature of this period.

== Literature of the late medieval period ==
=== Historical background of the late medieval period ===
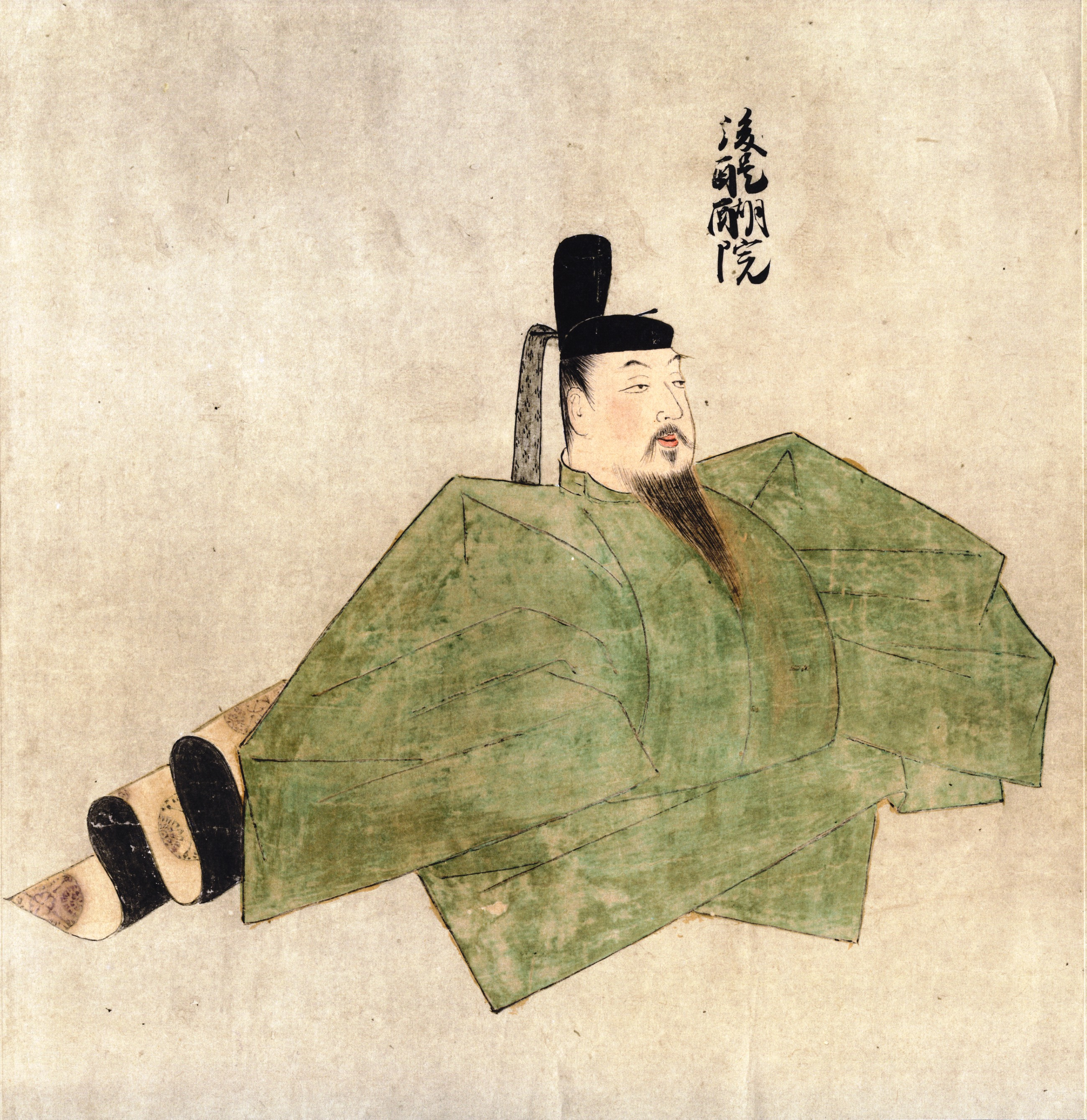
Emperor Go-Daigo brought an end to the Kamakura period by overthrowing the Kamakura shogunate and briefly restoring imperial rule. When this failed, he and his followers established a court in Yoshino, south of the capital.

The late medieval period covers the roughly 270 years that, by conventional Japanese historiography, are classified as the Nanbokuchō (1333–1392), Muromachi (1392–1573) and Azuchi–Momoyama (1573–1600) periods. The conflict between the northern and southern courts in the Nanbokuchō period, and the frequent civil wars in the Muromachi period, caused massive social upheaval in this period, with the nobility (who were already in decline) losing virtually all of their former prestige, and lower classes moving upward to take their place. In particular, the high-level members of the warrior class took over from the aristocracy as the custodians of culture.

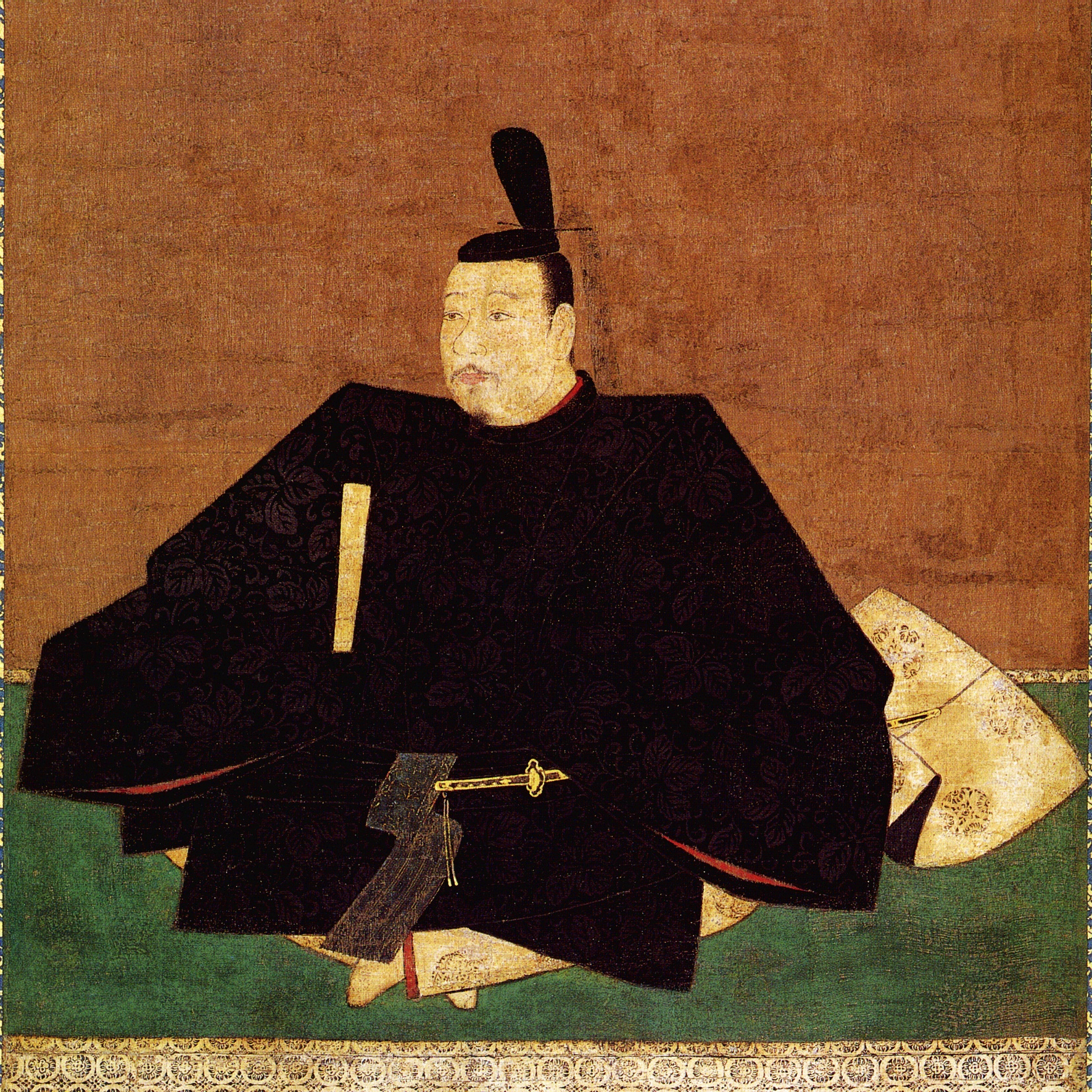
Ashikaga Takauji initially supported Emperor Go-Daigo before turning on him and establishing the Muromachi shogunate, which supported the northern court in Kyoto.

The literature of this period was created by nobles, warriors, and hermits and artists of the lower classes. The popular literature and entertainment, which had previously been of little consequence, came into the limelight during this time. The noh theatre came under the protection and sponsorship of the warrior class, with Kan'ami and his son Zeami bringing it to new artistic heights, while Nijō Yoshimoto and lower-class renga (linked verse) masters formalized and popularized that form.

This is the point when "ancient" literature came to an end and was replaced with literature more representative of the early modern period. This results in some degree of schizophrenia in the literature of this period, as contradictory elements are mixed freely. Deep and serious literature was combined with light and humorous elements, which is a noteworthy characteristic of late medieval literature. Noh and its comic counterpart kyōgen is the standard example of this phenomenon, but renga had haikai, waka had its kyōka and kanshi (poetry in Classical Chinese) had its kyōshi. Monogatari-zōshi composed during this period combined the aware of the serious monogatari with characteristics of humorous anecdotes.

Literature characterized by wabi-sabi was valued during this period of chaotic warfare. Commentary on and collation of the classics also came to the fore, with the "hidden traditions" of Kokinshū interpretation (kokin-denju) beginning. Furthermore, it was during this period that the classical Japanese literary tradition ceased to be the exclusive prerogative of the aristocracy, and passed into the hands of scholarly-minded warriors and hermits. Ichijō Kaneyoshi and Sanjōnishi Sanetaka were noteworthy scholars of aristocratic origins, and in addition to writing commentaries such aristocratic scholars examined and compared a large volume of manuscripts. This opening up to the general populace of classical literature was also advanced by hermit renga masters such as Sōgi.

Ichiko notes that while this reverence for the literature of the past was important, it is also a highly noteworthy characteristic of this period that new genres and forms, unlike those of earlier eras, prevailed. He also emphasizes that even though this was a period of bloody warfare and tragedy, the literature is often lively and bright, a trend that continued into the early modern period.

=== Literature in Chinese ===
Classical Chinese (kanbun) literature of the Heian period had been the domain of aristocratic men, but as the aristocracy fell from prominence writing in Chinese became more closely associated with Zen Buddhist monks. Zen monks travelling back and forth between Japan and China brought with them the writings of Song and Yuan China, and writing in Chinese by Japanese authors experienced something of a renaissance.

The Chinese literature produced during this period is known as the literature of the Five Mountains because of its close association with the monks of the Five Mountain System. The founder of the lineage was Yishan Yining (Issan Ichinei in Japanese), an immigrant from Yuan China, and his disciples included Kokan Shiren, Sesson Yūbai, Musō Soseki and others; these monks planted the seeds of the Five Mountains literary tradition. Kokan's Genkō Shakusho is an important work of this period. Ichiko remarks that while Chūgan Engetsu also created excellent writings at this time, it was Musō's disciples Gidō Shūshin and Zekkai Chūshin who brought the literature of the Five Mountains to its zenith. Keene calls the latter two "masters of Chinese poetry", describing Zekkai as "the greatest of the Five Mountains poets".

Musō and Gidō in particular had the ear of powerful members of the military class, to whom they acted as cultural and spiritual tutors. The tradition continued to flourish into the Muromachi period, when it came under the protection of the shogunate, but this led to its developing a tendency toward sycophancy, and while there continued to be exceptional individuals like Ikkyū Sōjun, this period showed a general tendency toward stagnation and degradation. Nevertheless, Ichiko notes, the literature of the Five Mountains had a profound impact on the cultural and artistic development of the Nanbokuchō period.

=== Late medieval waka ===
Four imperial anthologies were compiled during the Nanbokuchō period: three by the Nijō school and one, the Fūga Wakashū, by the Kyōgoku school. The latter was directly compiled by retired emperor Kōgon, and has the second greatest number of Kyōgoku poems after the Gyokuyō Wakashū. The Shin'yō Wakashū, a quasi-chokusenshū compiled by Prince Munenaga, collects the works of the emperors and retainers of the Southern Court.

In the Muromachi period, the waka composed by the nobility continued to stagnate, and after Asukai Masayo compiled the Shinshoku-kokin Wakashū, the twenty-first imperial anthology, the age of court waka was at its end.

The most important waka poets of this period were not courtiers but monks, hermits, and warriors. Examples of prominent monk-poets are the Nijō poet Ton'a in the Nanbokuchō period and Shōtetsu (who wrote the book of poetic theory Shōtetsu Monogatari) and Shinkei (who was also a noted renga master) in the Muromachi period. Important waka poets of the samurai class include Imagawa Ryōshun in the early period, Tō Tsuneyori (said to be the founder of the kokin-denju tradition) and others toward the middle of this period, and Hosokawa Yūsai at the very end of the middle ages. Yūsai carried the waka tradition on into the early modern period, an act whose significance, according to Ichiko, should not be underestimated.

=== Renga ===
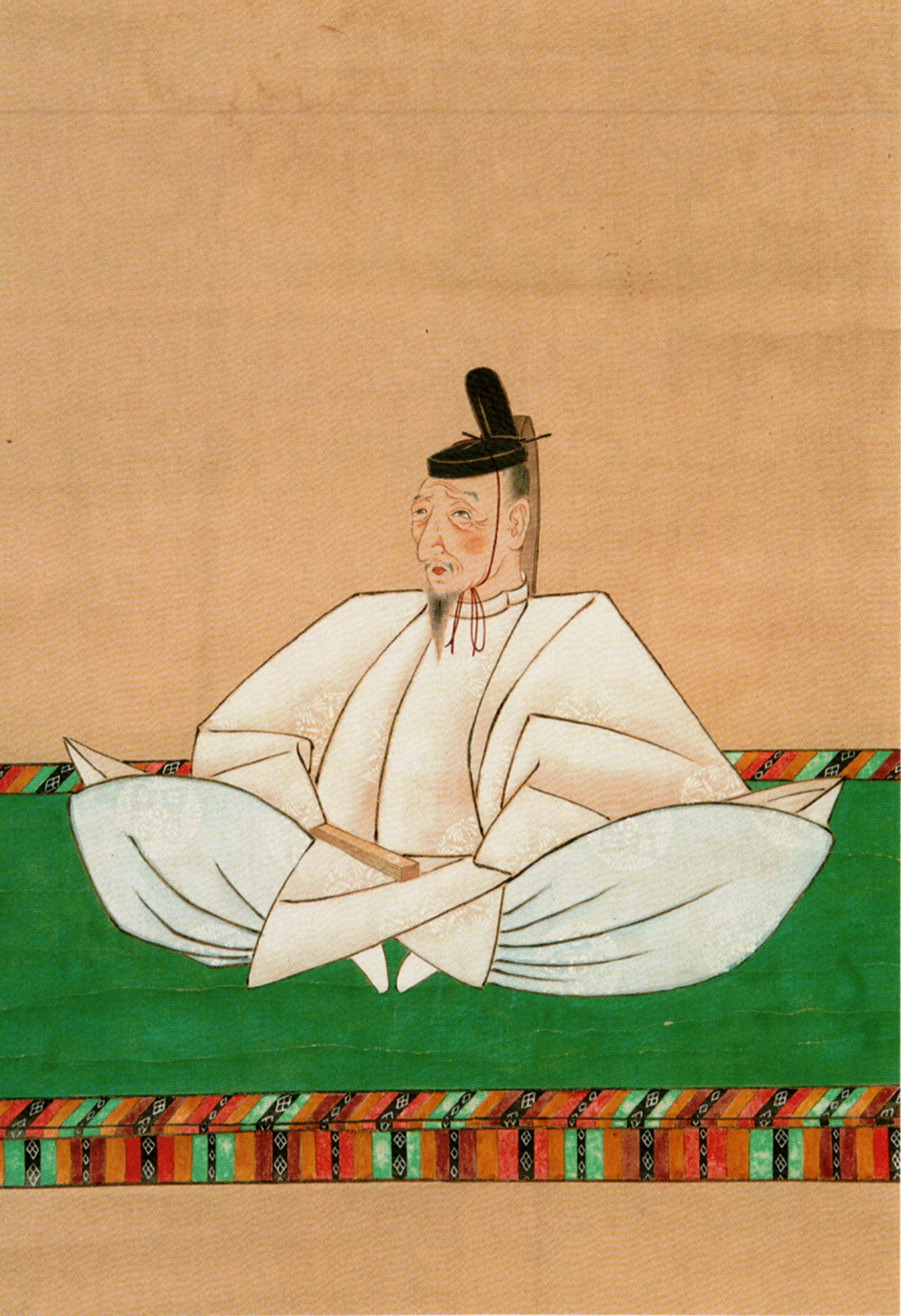
Nijō Yoshimoto is credited with securing the status of renga as an important literary practice.

Linked verse, or renga, took the place of waka as the dominant poetic form during this period. Renga, or more specifically chō-renga (長連歌), emphasized wit and change, and was practiced in earlier times by both the nobility and commoners, but during the Nanbokuchō period Nijō Yoshimoto organized gatherings of both nobles and commoners and with the assistance of hermits like Kyūsei was able to formalize the renga tradition and compile the first true renga anthology, the Tsukuba-shū. Yoshimoto also composed important books of renga theory such as Renri Hishō and Tsukuba Mondō (筑波問答).

Later came notable poets like Bontōan, but renga went into a brief period of stagnation until the Eikyō era (1429–1441), when the favour of the shōgun Ashikaga Yoshinori led to its being rejuvenated. The Seven Sages of the Bamboo Grove (竹林の七賢), including such masters as Sōzei and Shinkei were at their height during this period. Shinkei, who was also a prominent waka poet, wrote works of waka and renga theory such as Sasame-goto and Hitori-goto. Sōgi, who was active from roughly the time of the Ōnin War, built on these developments and helped renga to reach its highest point. With Kensai he compiled the Shinsen Tsukuba-shū, and with his disciples Shōhaku and Sōchō created renga masterpieces such as Minase Sangin Nannin Hyakuin (水無瀬三吟何人百韻) and Yuyama Sangin (湯山三吟).

Sōgi's disciples Sōchō, Sōseki (ja), Sōboku and other's carried on his legacy, teaching others and continuing the glory days of the genre. The most important renga master of the end of this period was Satomura Jōha, who wrote Renga Shihō-shō (連歌至宝抄). He continued the practice of expanding renga to the masses, with his family (the Satomura clan) continuing to play a central role in the renga world into the Edo period. Under his influence, renga became fixed, causing it to stagnate, and leading to the increased popularity of haikai no renga.

Haikai had been popular even in the golden age of renga, but went on the rise beginning with Chikuba Kyōgin-shū (竹馬狂吟集), the Ise priest Arakida Moritake's Haikai no Renga Dokugin Senku (俳諧之連歌独吟千句, also known as Moritake Senku 守武千句) and Yamazaki Sōkan's Inu Tsukuba-shū (Haikai Renga-shō 俳諧連歌抄) in the late Muromachi period. Haikai developed from renga at roughly the same time as kyōka developed from waka. Some haikai, according to Ichiko, ventured too far into absurdity, but they tapped into the popular spirit of the Japanese masses, and laid the groundwork for the major developments of the form in the early modern period.

=== Monogatari-zōshi ===
The giko-monogatari of the earlier period largely ceased during the Nanbokuchō period, and an incredibly large number of shorter works known as monogatari-zōshi (more commonly called otogi-zōshi, a name that was applied later) were created. Many of them are unsophisticated and childish, and were written for a much broader audience than the earlier tale literature, which had been written by and for the aristocracy exclusively. As a result, they cover a much broader range of topics, and were written not only by nobles but by warriors, monks, hermits and urbanites.

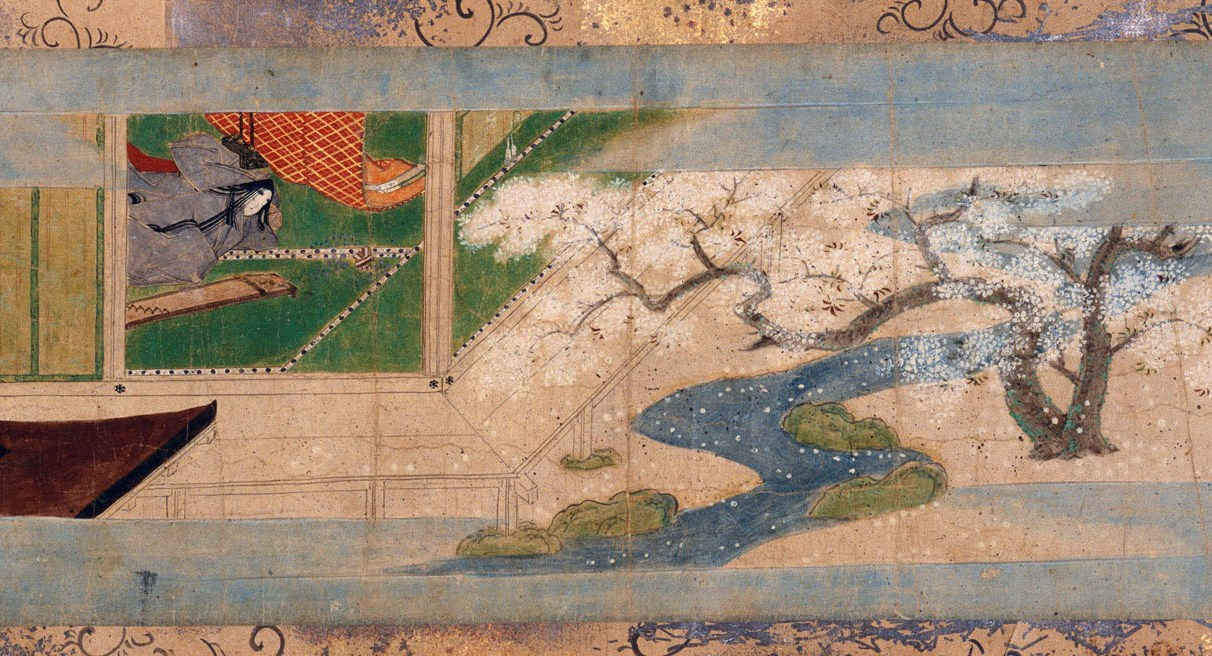
Utatane Sōshi is a noted example of the "aristocratic" otogi-zōshi.

Of the works that continued the courtly tradition, some (such as Wakakusa Monogatari) told romantic love stories and some (such as Iwaya no Sōshi) contained stories of unfortunate stepchildren. Among those about members of the warrior class, some (such as Shutendōji) drew upon gunki monogatari and heroic legends of monster-slayers, some (such as Onzōshi Shima-watari) built legends of warriors, and others (such as Muramachi Monogatari and Akimichi) told of chaos between rival houses and revenge. A very large number of them are about religious themes, reflecting the rise of popular Buddhism during this period. Some of these works (such as Aki no Yo no Naga Monogatari) described monastic life, some (such as Sannin Hōshi) expounded the virtues of seclusion, some (such as Kumano no Honji) elaborate on the origins of temples and shrines in light of the concept of honji suijaku ("original substances manifest their traces", the concept that the gods of Shinto are Japanese manifestations of Buddhist deities), and some (such as Eshin-sōzu Monogatari) are biographies of Buddhist saints.

In addition to the above works about nobles, warriors and monks, there are also a number of works in which the protagonists are farmers and urban commoners, known as risshin-shusse mono (立身出世物, "tales of rising up in the world") and shūgi-mono (祝儀物). Examples of the former include Bunshō-zōshi (文正草子) and examples of the latter include Tsuru-Kame Monogatari (鶴亀物語). A number of these works are based on popular folk-tales, and reflect themes of gekokujō and the lively activity of the lower classes. Several feature settings outside Japan, including the engi-mono of the early period and such works as Nijūshi-kō (二十四孝) and Hōman-chōja (宝満長者).

A number of works, called irui-mono (異類物) or gijin-shōsetsu (擬人小説, "personification novels"), include anthropomorphized plants and animals, and these appear to have been very popular among readers of the day. Examples of this group include war stories like Aro Gassen Monogatari (鴉鷺合戦物語, lit. "The Tale of the Battle of the Crow and the Heron"), love stories like Sakura-Ume no Sōshi (桜梅草子), and tales of spiritual awakening and living in monastic seclusion such as Suzume no Hosshin (雀の発心), while some, such as Nezumi no Sōshi (鼠の草子), portray romance and/or marriage between humans and anthropomorphized animals, and such works were widely disseminated. These works, along with tales of slaying monsters (怪物退治談 kaibutsu-taiji tan), appear to have been popular in an age when weird and creepy tales (怪談 kaidan (literature) and 奇談 kidan) proliferated.

The short prose fiction of this era, as elaborated above, differed drastically from the courtly fiction of early ages in its variety. More than 500 were written, and many come down to us in manuscript copies that include beautiful coloured illustrations. It is believed that these works were read aloud to an audience, or were enjoyed by readers of varying degrees of literacy with the help of the pictures. They represent a transition between the courtly fiction of earlier times to the novels of the early modern period.

=== Late medieval rekishi monogatari and historical works ===
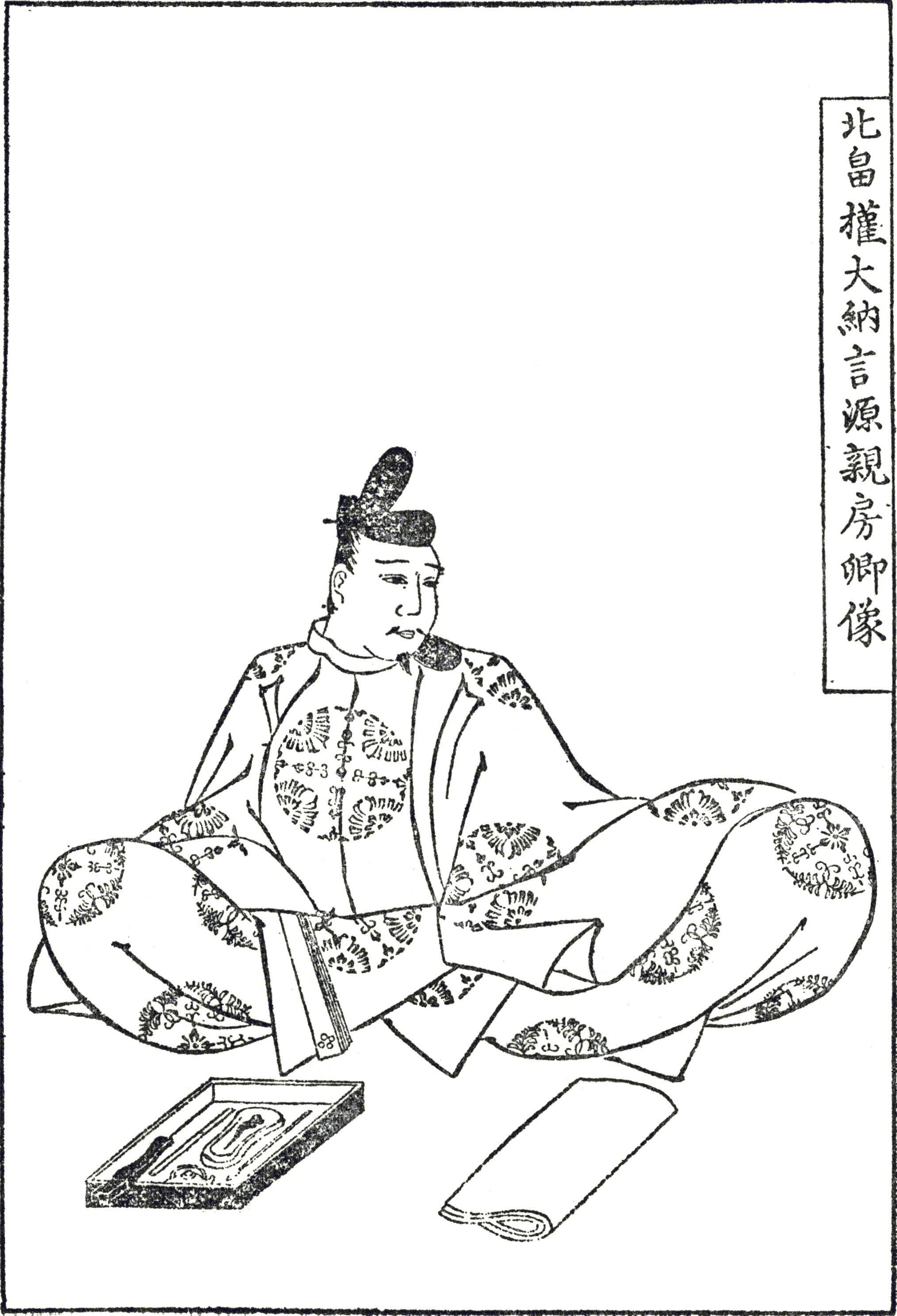
Kitabatake Chikafusa wrote one of the most important historical works of this period.

The work Masukagami ("The Clear Mirror"), a historical tale of the kind discussed above, was created in the Nanbokuchō period. It was the last of the "mirrors" (鏡物 kagami-mono) of Japanese history, and portrays the history, primarily of the imperial family, of the period between the emperors Go-Toba and Go-Daigo. Ichiko writes that it is a nostalgic work that emphasizes continuity from the past, and is lacking in new flavour, but that among the "mirrors" the quality of its Japanese prose is second only to the Ōkagami.

Other works, such as the Baishōron, straddle the border between the courtly "mirrors" and the gunki monogatari; the most noteworthy work of this period, though, is Kitabatake Chikafusa's Jinnō Shōtōki, which describes the succession of the emperors beginning in the Age of the Gods. Similarly to the Gukanshō, it includes not only a dry narration of historical events but a degree of interpretation on the part of its author, with the primary motive being to demonstrate how the "correct" succession has followed down to the present day. Ichiko notes the grave and solemn language and tensity of the content of this work of historical scholarship, which was written during a time of constant warfare.

=== Late medieval gunki monogatari ===
The most outstanding tale of military conflict of this period is the Taiheiki, a massive work noted not only for its value as a historical chronicle of the conflict between the Northern and Southern courts but for its literary quality. It is written in a highly Sinicized wakan konkō-bun, and lacks the lyricism of The Tale of the Heike, being apparently meant more as a work to be read than sung to an audience. It is infused with a sense of Confucian ethics and laments the last days, and its criticism of the rulers gives it a new flair. Ichiko calls it second only to the Heike as a masterpiece of the gunki monogatari genre. The work's title, meaning "Record of Great Peace", has been interpreted variously as satire or irony, referring to the "great pacification" that its heroes attempt to implement, and expressing a sincere hope that, following the end of the violent events it describes, peace would finally return to Japan.

Peace did not return, however, and, carrying over into the Muromachi period, war continued almost without stop. Tales of martial escapades in this period include the Meitokuki, the Ōninki and the Yūki Senjō Monogatari (結城戦場物語). Ichiko notes that while each of these works have unique characteristics, they tend to follow a formula, recounting the (mostly small-scale) real-world skirmishes that inspired them in a blasé fashion and lacking the masterful quality of the Heike or Taiheiki. The Tenshōki (天正記), a collective name for the works Ōmura Yūko, records the exploits of Toyotomi Hideyoshi. It and other works of this period, which Ichiko calls "quasi-gunki monogotari" (準軍記物語), portray not large-scale conflicts with multiple heroes, but function more as biographical works of a single general. This offshoot genre includes tales such as the Soga Monogatari, which recounts the conflict of the Soga brothers, and the Gikeiki, which is focused on the life of the hero Minamoto no Yoshitsune. Ichiko notes that this kind of work broke the "deadlock" in the military tales and (particularly in the case of the Gikeiki) had a tremendous influence on the literature of later times.

=== Late medieval setsuwa literature ===
Setsuwa anthologies were apparently not as popular in the late medieval period as they had been before, with writers actually favouring the creation of standalone setsuwa works. In the Nanbokuchō period, (Note: Some scholars view Yoshino Shūi as a forgery composed in the late Muromachi period.) there was the Yoshino Shūi, a collection of uta monogatari-type setsuwa about poets tied to the Southern Court, but more noteworthy in Ichiko's view is the Agui Religious Instruction Community's Shintō-shū, believed to be the origin of the shōdō, a genre of popular literature expounding Buddhist principles. The Shintō-shū contains 50 stories, mostly honji suijaku-based works describing the origins of the gods of Shintō. There is a focus in the work on the Kantō region, and on divinities with the title myōjin, and it contains several setsuwa-type works, such as "The Tale of the Kumano Incarnation" (熊野権現事 Kumano-gongen no koto) and "The Tale of the Mishima Grand Divinity" (三島大明神事 Mishima-daimyōjin no koto) in the vein of setsuwa-jōruri and otogi-zōshi.

Going into the Muromachi period, works such as the Sangoku Denki (三国伝記) and Gentō (玄棟) and Ichijō Kaneyoshi's Tōsai Zuihitsu are examples of setsuwa-type literature. A variant on the setsuwa anthology that developed in this period is represented by such works as Shiteki Mondō (塵滴問答) and Hachiman Gutōkun, which take the form of dialogues that recount the origins of things. Along with the Ainōshō, an encyclopedic work compiled around this time, these stories probably appealed to a desire for knowledge on the part of their readers. Furthermore, more and more engi started being composed in this period, with new emakimono flourishing in a manner beyond that of the Kamakura and Nanbokuchō periods. Ichiko contends that these engi must be considered a special category of setsuwa.

Toward the end of the medieval period, Arakida Moritake compiled his Moritake Zuihitsu (守武随筆). The latter half of this work, titled "Accounts I Have Heard in an Uncaring World" (心ならざる世中の聞書 Kokoro narazaru yononaka no bunsho), collects some 23 short stories. This work is noted as a forerunner to the literature of the early modern period.

=== Late medieval diaries, travel literature and essays ===
The only surviving diary by a court woman in this period was the Takemuki-ga-Ki (竹むきが記), written by Sukena's daughter (日野資名女 Hino Sukena no musume) during the Nanbokuchō period. A number of courtiers' Chinese diaries survive from this period, including the Kanmon-nikki by Prince Sadafusa, the Sanetaka-kōki by Sanjōnishi Sanetaka, and the Tokitsune-kyōki by Yamashina Tokitsune. The Sōchō Shuki (宗長手記), written by the renga master Sōchō, is considered by Ichiko to be the only kana diary of this period to have literary merit.

Saka Jūbutsu's (坂十仏) work Ise Daijingū Sankeiki (伊勢太神宮参詣記), an account of a 1342 visit to the Ise Grand Shrine, is one example of a genre of travel literature describing pilgrimages. Other such works include the travel diaries of Gyōkō, a monk-poet who accompanied the shogun on a visit to Mount Fuji, Sōkyū's Miyako no Tsuto (都のつと), and Dōkō's Kaikoku Zakki (廻国雑記). A great many travel diaries by renga masters who travelled the country during this time of war, from Tsukushi no Michi no Ki (筑紫道) by Sōgi onward, also survive. Some warriors of the armies sweeping the country toward the end of the medieval period also left travel journals, including those of Hosokawa Yūsai and Kinoshita Chōshōshi.

Not many zuihitsu survive from this period, but the works of poetic theory that were written by the waka poets and renga masters include some that could be classified as essays. The works of Shinkei, including Sasamegoto (ささめごと), Hitorigoto (ひとりごと) and Oi no Kurigoto (老のくりごと) are examples of such literary essays, and are noted for their deep grasp of the aesthetic principles of yūgen, en, hie, sabi, and so on.

=== Noh, kyōgen and kōwakamai ===
Drama is a major facet of Japanese literature in the medieval period. From the Heian period on, entertainments such as sangaku, dengaku and sarugaku had been popular among the common people, while temples hosted music and dance rituals, namely fūryū and ennen. In the 14th and 15th centuries, Kan'ami and his son Zeami, artists in the Yamato sarugaku, tradition created noh (also called nōgaku), which drew on and superseded these forerunner genres. These men were able to accomplish this task not just because of their own skill and effort, but also the tremendous favour shown to the burgeoning art form by the Ashikaga shoguns. Kan'ami and Zeami—especially the latter—were great actors and playwrights, and pumped out noh libretti (called yōkyoku) one after the next.

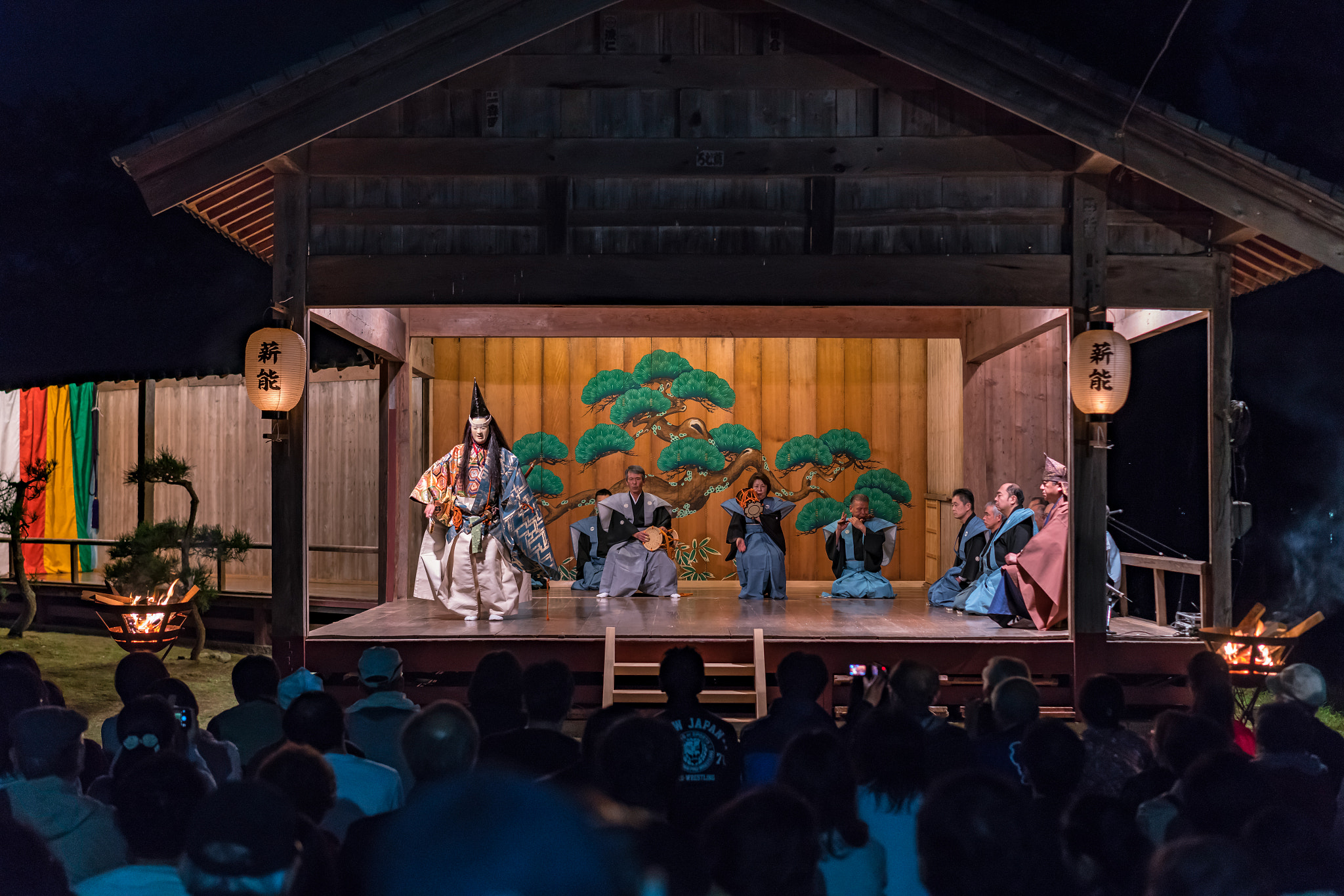
Noh developed into a full-fledged art form during this period.

Zeami also composed more than 20 works of noh theory, including Fūshi Kaden, Kakyō and Kyūi. Ichiko calls these excellent works of aesthetic and dramatic theory, which drew directly on Zeami's experience and personal genius. Zeami's son-in-law Konparu Zenchiku inherited these writings, but his own works such as Rokurin Ichiro no Ki (六輪一露之記) show the influence of not only Zeami but of waka poetic theory and Zen. Later noh theorists like Kanze Kojirō Nobumitsu continued to develop on the ideas of Zeami and Zenchiku, and under the auspices of the warrior class, the nobility, and various temples and shrines the noh theatre continued to grow and expand its audience into the Edo period.

Closely related to noh, and performed alongside it, was kyōgen (also called noh-kyōgen). Kyōgen was likely a development of sarugaku, but placed more emphasis on dialogue, and was humorous and often improvised. At some time around the Nanbokuchō period this genre split off from mainstream noh, and it became customary for a kyōgen performance to be put on between two noh plays. The language of kyōgen became solidified to a certain extent by around the end of the Muromachi period (mid-16th century). According to Ichiko, while noh consists of song, dance, and instrumentals, is more "classical" and "symbolic", and is based on the ideal of yūgen, kyōgen relies more on spoken dialogue and movement, is more "contemporary" and "realistic", and emphasizes satire and humour. Its language is more vernacular and its plots more comedic.

Kōwakamai developed somewhat later than noh. According to tradition, the form was established by Momoi Naoaki (桃井直詮), a Nanbokuchō warrior's son whose infanthood name was Kōwakamaru (幸若丸). Kōwakamai were performed by low-class entertainers in the grounds of temples and shrines, as musical adaptations of the medieval war tales, with their dances being straightforward and simple. 51 libretti are extant, including heiji-mono (平治物, works based on the Heiji Monogatari), heike-mono (平家物, works based on The Tale of the Heike), hōgan-mono (判官物, works about the tragic hero Minamoto no Yoshitsune), and soga-mono (曽我物, works based on the Soga Monogatari). Such performances were apparently well-loved by members of the warrior class during the chaotic period of the late 15th and 16th centuries, but went into decline in the Edo period.

=== Folk songs ===
While imayō, as well as enkyoku (宴曲, or sōga/haya-uta 早歌) and wasan (Buddhist hymns), were popular in the early medieval period, the later medieval period was dominated by sōga and the newly emerging ko-uta (小歌). The representative collection of ko-uta is the 16th-century Kangin-shū, which includes a selection of sōga, songs to be intoned and kōtai (小謡) songs from dengaku and sarugaku plays, arranged by genre, and more than a few of its entries sing of the joys and sorrows of the common people of that time. The Sōan Ko-uta Shū (宗安小歌集), compiled at the end of the Muromachi period, and the Ryūta Ko-uta Shū (隆達小歌集), compiled in the Azuchi–Momoyama period or at the very beginning of the Edo period, also collect ko-uta from this period. The Taue-zōshi (田植草紙) records the farming songs sung by rice farmers during the religious rituals performed when planting their rice paddies.

=== Kirishitan literature ===
For almost a century after the arrival of Francis Xavier in Kagoshima in Tenbun 18 (1549), Jesuit missionaries actively sought converts among the Japanese, and the literature these missionaries and Japanese Christian communities produced is known as Kirishitan Nanban literature (キリシタン南蛮文学 kirishitan-nanban bungaku). This includes both translations of European literature and Christian religious literature produced in Japan. The Amakusa edition of The Tale of the Heike (天草本平家物語 Amakusa-bon Heike Monogatari), which translated the work into the vernacular Japanese of the sixteenth century and represented it entirely in romanized Japanese, was printed in Bunroku 1 (1592), and the following year saw the printing of the Isoho Monogatari (伊曾保物語), a translation into vernacular Japanese of Aesop's Fables that was similarly printed entirely in romanized Japanese. Isoho Monogatari, because it was seen as a secular collection of moral fables, managed to survive the anti-Christian proscriptions of Tokugawa period, continuing to be printed in Japan until at least 1659, with several handwritten copies also surviving.

Cover of Arte da Lingoa de Iapam

The Jesuits also published linguistic works such as the Portuguese-Japanese dictionary Vocabulário da Língua do Japão and João Rodrigues's Arte da Lingoa de Iapam, which were originally produced to assist in proselytizing activities, but have become important resources for Japanese historical linguistics. Other works included Dochirina Kirishitan, a Japanese edition of Doctrina Christiana that has been noted for its simple, clear and direct use of the Japanese vernacular.

Ichiko notes that these works, which were all produced in the Azuchi–Momoyama and very early Edo periods, did not have a significant influence on medieval Japanese literature, but are nonetheless an important part of the history of Japanese thought at the end of the middle ages.
