= The New Lady-in-Waiting Is a Chigo =

The New Lady-in-Waiting Is a Chigo (稚児今参り) is a chigo tale of the otogi-zōshi. It tells the story of a chigo who falls in love with a teenager aristocrat girl and seeks to win her love. The novel was written during the Muromachi period (1336 to 1573) and is one of the few chigo tales to not feature homosexual themes.

== See also ==
- Aki no Yo no Naga Monogatari
- Ashibiki
