= Chigo =

Adolescent Boys in Buddhist Temples during the Edo Period

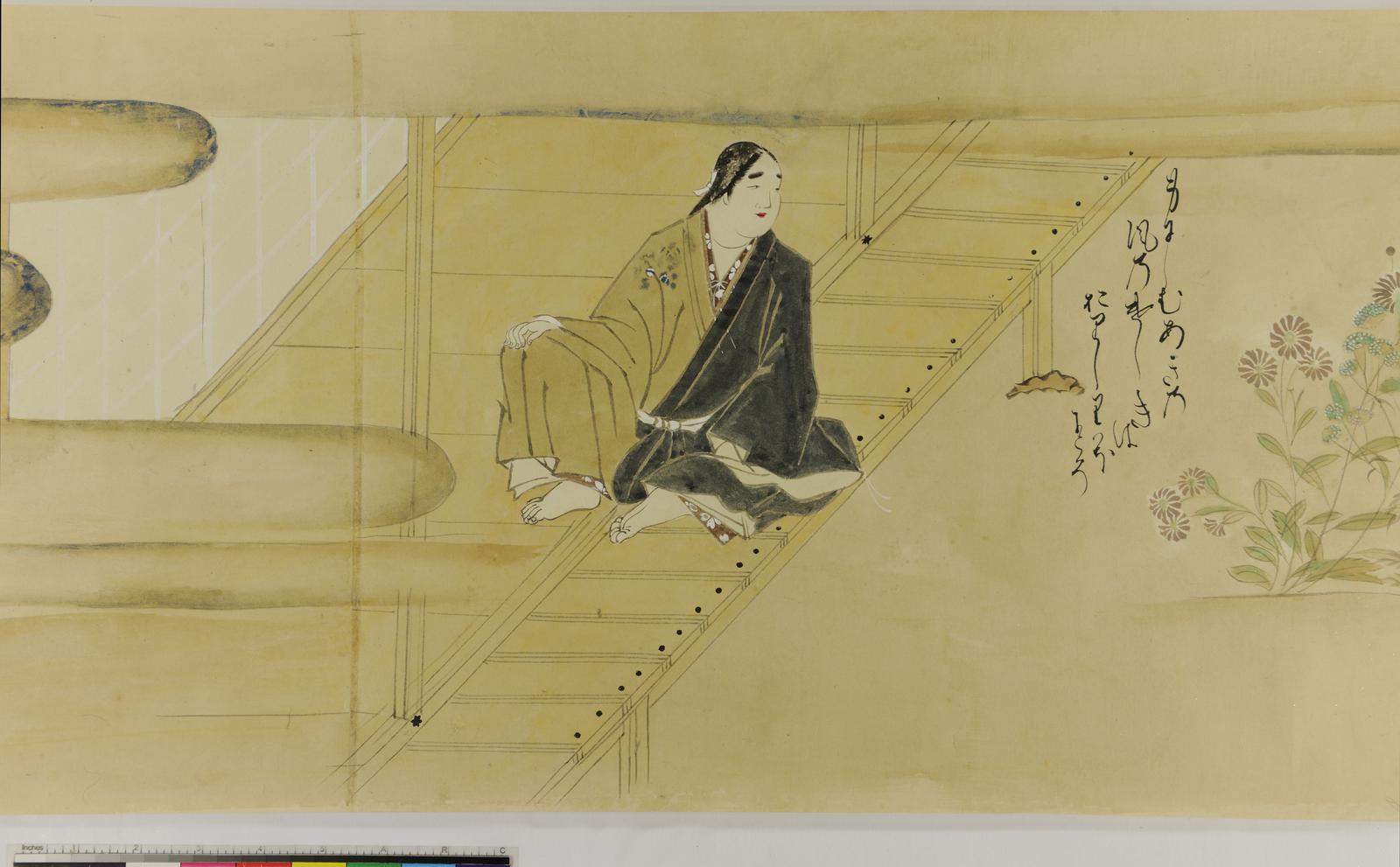
A chigo illustrated in the Book of Acolytes (稚児之草紙, Chigo no Soushi), a 14th-century anthology of five chigo tales

Chigo (稚児, literally "child"; sometimes referred in English to as "acolytes") were young boys who provided work and sexual favors to Buddhist monks in medieval Japanese temples in exchange for education and other privileges. Often coming from noble families, they were ranked higher than lowly temple children, but lower than children of high-ranking aristocrats (公達, kindachi).

== History ==
Pederastic relationships between chigo and noblemen, monks and clergymen were common in Japan from the medieval times until the early modern period. A wealth of poems written by clergymen about their beloved catamites have been produced during that time and compiled in imperial anthologies.

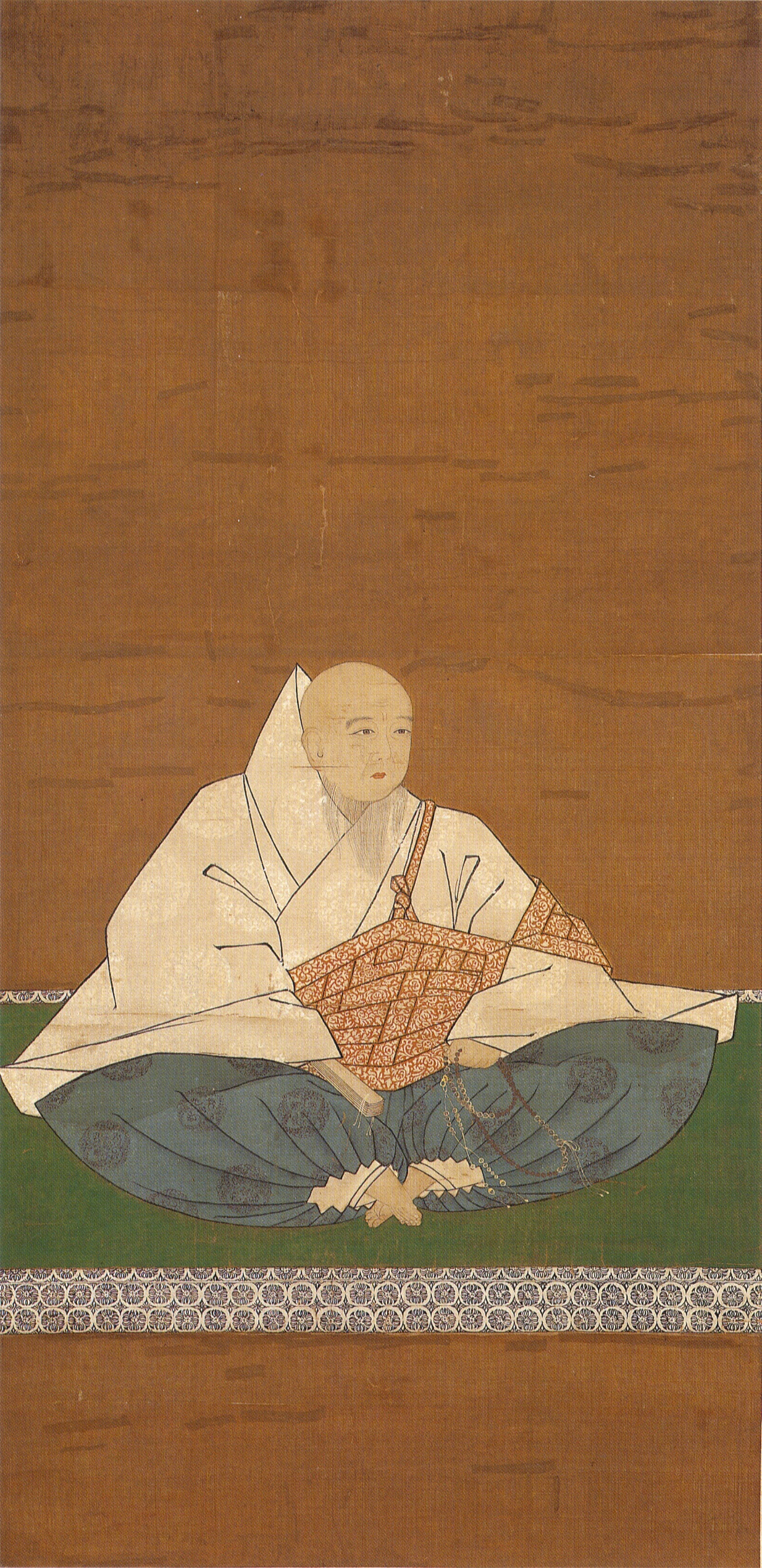
Jinson in a 16th century painting

Chigo were commonly aged twelve to nineteen. They often came from military, samurai, bureaucratic, or otherwise noble families, although some were of humble origins. The main objective of a chigo's stay in a Buddhist temple was to receive education and become prepared for adult life.

Jinson (尋尊), son of Ichijo Kaneyoshi (一条 兼良), had two chigo during his life. The first, Aichiyo-maru, served him from 1475, at the age of fourteen, until the age of nineteen. The other, Aimitsu-maru, started serving him at the age of fifteen. Jinson suggested in his diary that he did have sex with Aimitsu.

== Initiation ritual ==
Before becoming a chigo, a boy needed to undergo a chigo kanjou (稚児灌頂) ritual that lasted multiple weeks. Upon concluding his ritual, the boy would be considered sacralized as a Buddhist or Shinto deity, and any sexual intercourse with him would no longer be considered a breach of a monk's celibacy vow.

== Roles and privileges ==
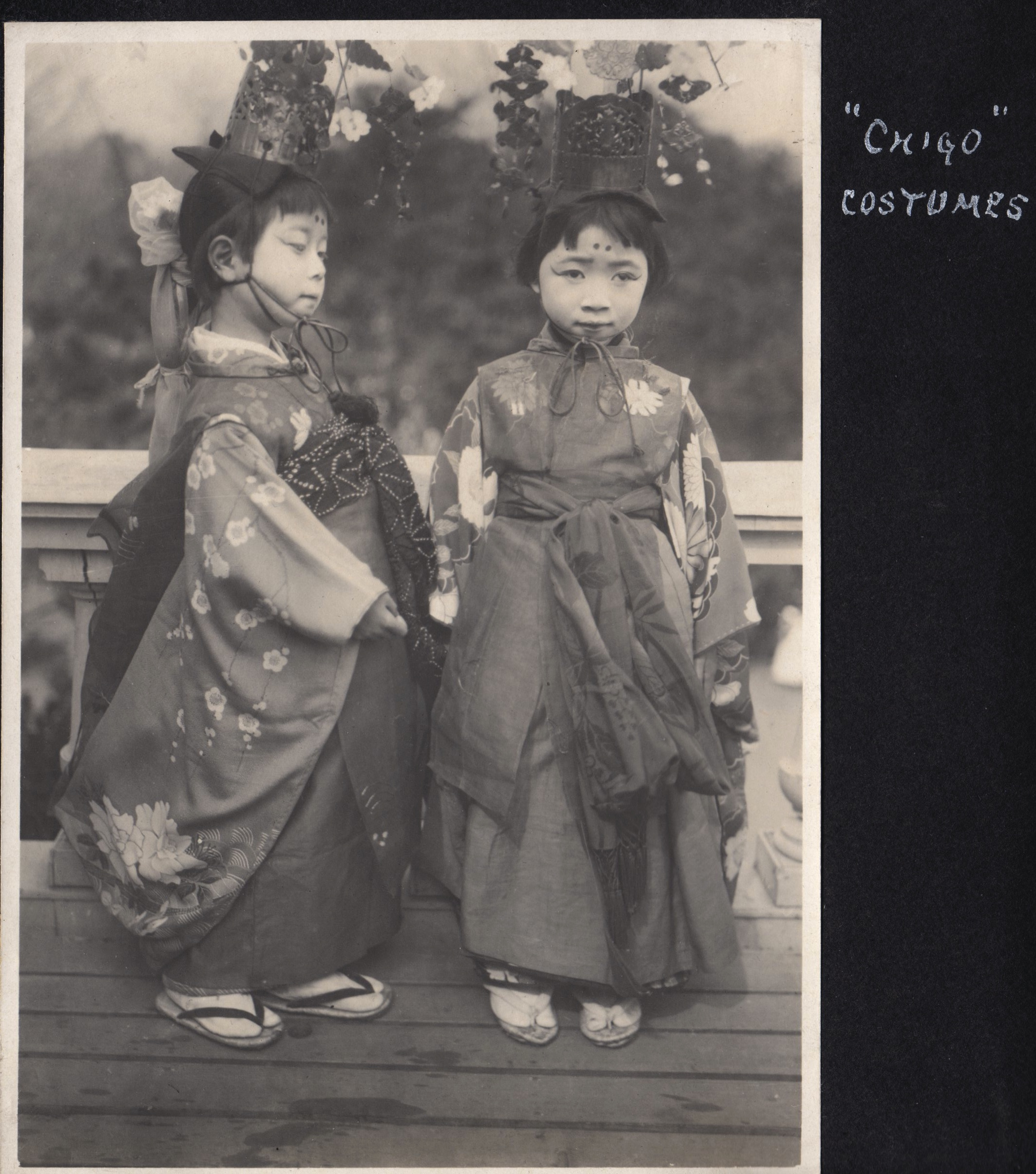
A 20th century photograph of children wearing chigo costumes

In addition to serving their masters and providing sexual services, chigo would participate in religious and public events, including processions. They often wore makeup and colorful attires, and had their teeth tinted.

Although they were considered inferior to children of some high-ranking nobles, chigo had special privileges such as the right to wear extravagant clothes, eat meat and sit near the seat of honor in a banquet, among others. They were taught poetry, music and Chinese philosophy, among other topics. Some chigo were required to follow other rules of how they should behave. Many chigo had child servants of their own.

Chigo often received love poems from their elders. Others have also produced and compiled poems themselves. The Shinshokukokin Wakashuu anthology was edited by chigo Hoewaka-maru and Kahō-maru, and Ansen wakashuu was compiled by Aiyo-maru.

Chigo were allowed to change their masters. Most chigo lived in their temples for about five years. Many would later become clergymen, aristocrats or samurai.

== Chigo tales ==
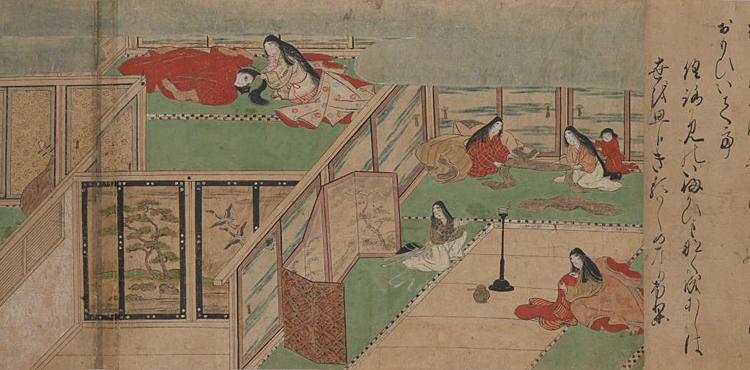
A chigo, Wakagimi (若君, literally "young lord"), having his hair cut by his stepmother in his sleep

Chigo monogatari (稚児物語, literally "chigo tales") are a sub-genre of otogi-zoushi. They are classified in Ichiko Teiji's Study of Medieval Novels as religious or monk novels set in temples and in which "the protagonist is a chigo". Ichiko wrote that these novels are "often" related to male homosexuality (男色). Most of such novels were written during the Kamakura or Muromachi periods.

Religious themes are abundant in chigo tales. Many of them portray chigo as specific incarnations of bodhisattvas. Often tragic, such novels commonly depict chigo as victims of false accusations, kidnapping, murder (real or attempted), violence and suicide, among other misfortunes. Many tales that end with the death of a chigo mirror other religious awakening ( 発心譚) themes of other otogi-zoushi novels, and themes of chigo falling in love with men other than their masters appear in most stories.

Much of what is historically known about chigo and their roles comes from chigo tales, alongside corroborative historical evidence. One of the oldest anthologies of chigo tales is the Book of Acolytes (chigo no soushi), copied in 1321, which contains five stories accompanied with explicit pornographic pictures. A number of chigo have also been depicted singing, dancing and playing songs in emakimono.

=== List of chigo tales ===
- Aki no Yo no Naga Monogatari (秋夜長物語), an archetypical chigo tale and the first to be translated to English in 1980
- Ashibiki (葦曳)
- Hanamitsu (花みつ)
- Kōzuke no kimi shōsoku (上野君消息)
- Genmu monogatari (幻夢物語)
- Ben no sōshi (弁草紙)
- Chigo Kannon engi (稚児観音縁起)
- Matsuho no ura monogatari (松帆浦物語)
- Saga monogatari 嵯峨物語 (The tale of Saga)
- Toribeyama monogatari (鳥辺山物語)
- Chigo imamairi (稚児今参り), a late chigo tale without any homosexual or religious themes
- Chigo no sōshi (稚児草子)

== See also ==
- Tale of Idolized Boys (2021), a book about chigo
- Chigo dance – Japanese traditional dance
