= Aisome-gawa =

Aisome-gawa (Japanese 藍染川, 'Aisome River') may refer to:

- Aisome-gawa (Noh), a Japanese Noh play
- Aisome-gawa (otogi-zōshi), a Japanese illustrated short story, an adaptation of the play
- Aisome-gawa (jōruri), a Japanese traditional narrative music piece based on Aisome-gawa (Noh)

== See also ==
- Aisome, a village annexed into Ikeda, Nagano, Japan
- Shakujii River, Tokyo, Japan
