= Tenjin no Honji =

Tenjin no Honji (天神の本地) is a Japanese otogi-zōshi in two scrolls, likely composed at the end of the Muromachi period.

== Plot ==
In the reign of the Engi Emperor (延喜帝), (Note: Emperor Daigo) there was a minister by the name of Sugawara who was of low birth but had tremendous favour and influence with the emperor. There was at this time also a minister named Tokihira whose skill and influence were less than the Sugawara Minister's. Jealous of the Sugawara Minister, Tokihira set a fire inside the palace grounds, and cast the blame on his rival. The emperor commanded Tokihira to arrest the Sugawara Minister, and Tokihira obliged, capturing and tying up his rival.

The Sugawara Minister climbed Mount Hiei and bid a tearful farewell to his teacher Hōshōbō before travelling by sea into exile in the Dazai-fu. His servants were murdered by Tokihira after seeing their master off. The Sugawara Minister bemoaned his lonely exile in poetry, but then the miracle of the tobi-ume occurred, and when he prayed to Bonten and Taishaku proclaiming his innocence, with a crack of lightning a slip of paper fell from the sky proclaiming Namu taisei itoku tenman dai-jizai tenjin (南無大聖威徳天満大自在天神), and he died.

Kan Shōjō (Note: 菅丞相, another name for Sugawara no Michizane) appeared to Hōshōbō on Mount Hiei and told him not to interfere with his revenge. The apparition ate a pomegranate before blowing down the door and bursting into flames. In a single night, Kan Shōjō, in the form of a white-haired figure, attacked the palace with lightning, and Tokihira was kicked to death. The emperor, terrified, summoned Hōshōbō to court. Hōshōbō descended from the mountain, crosses the Kamo River as it flooded and surged with waves, and arrived at the palace. The monk prayed, causing Kan Shōjō to rise up to heaven.

From this point on, Kan Shōjō was worshipped as Tenman Dai-jizai Tenjin.

== Genre and date ==
Tenjin no Honji is a work of the otogi-zōshi genre, a short prose narrative written in Japan's medieval period; specifically it is a honjimono, a work describing the deeds of a divinity during their human lifetime and the origin of one or more religious sites associated with them. Literary scholar Manabu Murakami, in his article on the work for the Nihon Koten Bungaku Daijiten, dates it to "perhaps the end of the Muromachi period".

== Sources and themes ==
The work is clearly based on the Kitano Tenjin Engi, in particular those texts in the Anrakuji-bon manuscript line, and transforms the religious text describing the origin of the god Tenjin into a narrative tale. Compared to the Engi, Tenjin no Honji includes a lot more waka (poetry in classical Japanese) and fewer kanshi (poetry in classical Chinese).

The Kitano Tenjin Shrine was an important focus for the religious practices of the people of Kyoto in the middle ages (the twelfth to sixteenth centuries), and per Murakami this work seems to reflect that popular religious sentiment. Murakami further speculates that it may also have been created on commission from a temple.

== Textual tradition ==
Tenjin no Honji is in two scrolls, although it survives in numerous copies of different formats. A two-scroll copy traditionally attributed to Ichijō Kanefuyu is in the holdings of the Tenri Central Library, which also possesses a one-scroll emaki edition, a damaged one-scroll miniature emaki edition, and a two-volume Nara-ehon edition. A one-scroll emaki edition is in the possession of Toyoko Takasu (鷹巣豊子). The Kyoto University School of Letters holds a one-volume Nara-ehon edition, whose ending is missing, and there is a two-volume printed edition dating to Keian 1 (1648).

=== Modern editions ===
==== Facsimiles ====
- Tenri Toshokan Zenpon Sōsho (天理図書館善本叢書) Ko-Nara-ehon (I) (古奈良絵本集（一）; based on the one-scroll Tenri University text)
- Otogi-zōshi Emaki (御伽草子絵巻; edited by Hideo Okuhira and published in 1982; based on the Takasu text; also includes printed text)

==== Critical printed editions ====
The work was printed in volume one of the Muromachi-jidai Monogatari Taisei (室町時代物語大成) based on the emaki formally in the holdings of the Shōkōkan, the Nara-ehon formerly in the holdings of Ken Sasano and the Keian edition. It also appeared in volume one of the Shintō Monogatari Shū (神道物語集), part of the Denshō Bungaku Shiryō-shū (伝承文学資料集), based on the two-scroll Tenri University text, the 1961 Shintō Monogatari Shū (神道物語集) edited by Shigeru Yokoyama, based on the one-scroll text in the holdings of the Akagi Archives (赤木文庫 Akagi-bunko), and volume ten of the Muromachi-jidai Monogatari Taisei based on the one-scroll Tenri University text, the emaki in the holdings of Ōsaka Tenmangū, and Keian edition.
