= Teiji =

- Gender: Male

Origin
- Origin: Japanese
- Meaning: Different meanings depending on the kanji used

Teiji (written: 貞治, 貞司, 貞二, 貞次, 悌二 or 悌次) is a masculine Japanese given name. Notable people with the name include:

- Teiji Honma (本間 悌次; born 1911), Japanese ice hockey player
- Teiji Ito (伊藤 貞司; 1935–1982), Japanese composer
- Teiji Ichiko (市古 貞次, 1934-2004), Japanese medievalist
- Teiji Ōmiya (大宮 悌二; 1928–1994), Japanese voice actor and actor
- Teiji Takagi (高木 貞治; 1875–1960), Japanese mathematician
- Teiji Takahashi (高橋 貞二; 1926–1959), Japanese actor
