= Manabu Murakami =

Manabu Murakami is the name of:

- Manabu Murakami (scholar) (born 1936), scholar of classical Japanese literature
- Manabu Murakami (wrestler) or Manjimaru (born 1984), Japanese professional wrestler
