= Ashibiki =

15th century Japanese novel

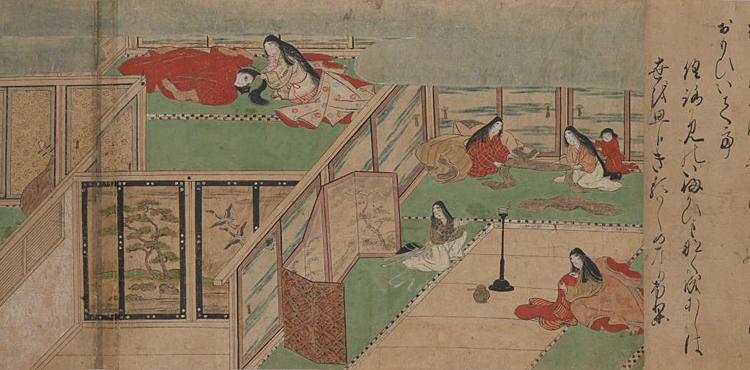
An illustration of the Ashibiki-e scroll, a designated Important Cultural Property

Ashibiki (あしびき, "the mountain") is a chigo tale of the otogi-zōshi. The novel tells the story of Wakagimi, a chigo from Kōfuku-ji, who falls in love with a priest. The story was written in the 15th century and had its emakimono classified as an Important Cultural Property of Japan.

== See also ==
- Aki no Yo no Naga Monogatari
