= Manabu =

- Pronunciation: Ma-na-b(u)
- Gender: Male

Origin
- Origin: Japanese
- Meaning: It can have many different meanings depending on the kanji used.
- Region of origin: Japanese

Other names
- Related names: Gaku

Manabu (まなぶ, マナブ) is a masculine Japanese given name.

== Written forms ==
Manabu can be written using different kanji characters and can mean:

as a given name

- 学, "learn"

The name can also be written in hiragana or katakana.

== People ==
- Manabu Horii (学, born 1972), Japanese speed skater
- Manabu Kitabeppu (学, born 1957), Japanese professional baseball pitcher
- Manabu Mima (美馬 学; born 1986), Japanese professional baseball pitcher
- Manabu Miyazaki (学), Japanese writer and social critic
- Manabu Miyazaki (photographer) (学, born 1949), Japanese wildlife photographer
- Manabu Murakami (学 or 學, born 1936), Japanese literary scholar
- Manabu Murakami (学, born 1984), Japanese professional wrestler
- Manabu Nakamura (中村 学; born 1977), Japanese footballer
- Manabu Nakanishi (学, born 1967), Japanese professional wrestler
- Manabu Namiki (学, born 1971), Japanese video game music composer
- Manabu Orido (学, born 1968), Japanese racing driver
- Manabu Sakai (学, born 1965), Japanese politician
- Manabu Senzaki (学, born 1970), Japanese shogi player
- Manabu Suzuki (鈴木 学; born 1963), Japanese racing driver, journalist and sports announcer
- Manabu Suzuki (biathlete) (鈴木 学; born 1946), Japanese biathlete
- Manabu Terata (学, born 1971), Japanese politician
- Manabu Yamada (born 1969), Japanese mixed martial arts fighter
- Manabu Yokoyama (横山 学; born 1974), Japanese pole vaulter
- Mabanua (born 1984), Japanese drummer, real name Manabu Yamaguchi (山口 学)
- Screw (band) guitarist Manabu (born 1985)

== Fictional characters ==
- Manabu Itagaki (学), a character in the manga and anime series Fighting Spirit
- Manabu Kudō (学), a character in the 1997 film Welcome Back, Mr. McDonald
- Manabu Miyazawa, a character in the manga series BECK
- Manabu Saien, a character in the anime series series Beyblade
- Manabu Takagi (まなぶ), a minor character in the anime series Ojamajo Doremi
- Manabu Takasaki, a character from the anime and manga series Nichijou
- Manabu Yamaji (学), a character in the tokusatsu drama series Sekai Ninja Sen Jiraiya
- Manabu-kun (マナブくん), a character in the manga and anime series Tomodachi Game
- Manabu-San, a minor character in the manga Riki-Oh.
