= Urashima Tarō (otogi-zōshi) =

Japanese literary work

Urashima Tarō (浦島太郎) is a Japanese otogi-zōshi in one volume.

== Date, genre and title ==
Urashima Tarō was composed during the Muromachi period. It is a work of the otogi-zōshi genre. Most of the surviving manuscripts of the work give its title as simply Urashima, written in hiragana.

== Plot ==
Urashima Tarō of Tango Province spares the life of a turtle he has caught and releases it. The next day a beautiful woman arrives on a small boat, and requests Tarō escort her back to her country. He takes her to her home in the Dragon Palace, and becomes her husband. Three years later, he becomes homesick and requests her leave to go visit his home. His wife protests, but allows him to return home for time, admitting that she is the turtle (Note: Some texts have her as the daughter of the Dragon King (竜女, ryūnyo) or as Oto-hime.) he saved and entrusting him with a box as a keepsake, which she warns him never to open. On Tarō's return to his home, he learns to his shock that 700 years have passed. Without thinking, he opens the box he had received from his wife, and from it emerges purple cloud (Note: Some texts have smoke or white mist.) and his form changes. (Note: Picture scrolls from the mid-Muromachi period, but not later, have smoke from his funeral pyre seen in the Dragon Palace, and Oto-hime transforming into a turtle to come and mourn him herself.) He becomes a crane and at Hōrai meets again with the turtle. (Note: Picture scrolls from the late Muromachi period end the story here.) After this, he appears as the god Urashima-myōjin (浦島明神).

== Textual tradition ==
The work is generally in one kan (scroll or book). It survives in numerous manuscripts, including:

- a fragmentary picture scroll in the holdings of the Japanese Folk Crafts Museum, dating to the middle of the Muromachi period and including only the latter portion of the work;
- a picture scroll from the late Muromachi period, also in the holdings of the Japanese Folk Crafts Museum;
- a manuscript in the holdings of the Dai-Tōkyū Kinen Bunko (大東急記念文庫);
- the Takayasu-kyūzō-bon (高安旧蔵本), which is of a different textual line to the above three copies;
- the Tokushi-kyūzō-bon (禿氏旧蔵本), which is close to the later printed text (see below);
- a manuscript in the holdings of the Akagi Archive (赤木文庫, Akagi-bunko), which is of the same line as the printed text.

It was also printed as part of the Otogi-Zōshi Nijūsan-pen (御伽草子二十三編).

There is also a picture scroll containing no text, the Urashima-shin Emaki (浦島神絵巻).

== Works cited ==
- Fujii, Takashi (1983). "Urashima Tarō". Nihon Koten Bungaku Daijiten 日本古典文学大辞典 (in Japanese). Vol. 1. Tokyo: Iwanami Shoten. p. 318. OCLC 11917421.
