= Aisome-gawa (Noh) =

Aisome-gawa (藍染川, "Aisome River"), also known as Some-gawa (染川), is a Japanese Noh play. The libretto's author is unknown, but it was being performed as early as 1514. It is in present repertoires of two of the major Noh schools, Kanze and Konparu. The story concerns a former lover of the high priest of the Dazaifu Tenman-gū who travels to Kyūshū to see him, but is tricked by his jealous wife into committing suicide. The priest prays at his shrine, and the deity, Tenman-Tenjin, manifests and resurrects the lover. The play was modified early on because of disruption at performances. It influenced several later works of literature.

== Genre, authorship and date ==
Aisome-gawa is a Noh play. More specifically, it is classified as a genzai Noh (現在能), a relatively realistic work featuring human characters and taking place in a linear time line. It is a yonbanme-mono (四番目物).

It is of unknown authorship, and in the modern era it is part of the repertoires of both the Kanze and Konparu (金春流) schools. The Hōshō school used to perform it as well, but dropped it during the Meiji period.

The play's first recorded performance was in 1514.

== Cast of characters ==
- A woman (shite)
- Nakatsukasa Yorizumi (中務頼澄), the high priest of the Dazaifu Tenmangū (waki)
- Umechiyo (梅千代), the woman's companion (kokata)
- Yorizumi's new wife (ai)
- Sakon no Jō (左近尉), her servant (waki-tsure)
- Tenman-Tenjin, the deity of the Dazaifu Tenmangū (nochi-shite)

== Plot ==
=== Part One ===
A woman who has had sexual relations with the high priest of the Dazaifu Tenmangū, Nakatsukasa Yorizumi, while he was in the capital makes her way to Tsukushi accompanied by another woman named Umechiyo. Yorizumi's new wife is overcome with jealousy and forges a letter in her husband's hand, entrusting it to her servant Sakon no Jō to deliver it to the woman. The woman, thinking she has been rejected by her love, kills herself by jumping into the Aisome River.

=== Part Two ===
Yorizumi returns home and is shocked and saddened by what has happened. He prays at the shrine and Tenman-Tenjin appears before him and raises the woman from the dead.

== Themes ==
The work portrays the human emotions of normal people, but also incorporates some supernatural or dream-like elements.

== History ==
There was often disruption resulting from interruptions in the performance and misinformation, and there is evidence that the libretto was already being amended before the end of the Muromachi period in the mid-sixteenth century.

== Sources ==
No specific sources for the story have been identified. The Shinto prayers incorporated into the text are quoted from Nijūsanmai Shiki (二十三味式) and Tenjin-kō Shiki (天神講式).

== Influence ==
The play provided the inspiration for both an otogi-zōshi of the same name and a jōruri piece also of the same name.

== Works cited ==
- Nishino, Haruo (1983). "Aisome-gawa^{1}". Nihon Koten Bungaku Daijiten 日本古典文学大辞典 (in Japanese). Vol. 1. Tokyo: Iwanami Shoten. pp. 4–5. OCLC 11917421.
