= Chigo dance =

Japanese traditional dance

The chigo dance (稚児舞楽, chigo bugaku) is a traditional Japanese dance performed by chigo at Buddhist temples. It has existed for over 470 years and, in 2022, it was designated an Intangible Cultural Property of National Importance by the Agency for Cultural Affairs.
