= Tales of Idolized Boys =

2021 book

- Author: Sachi Schmidt-Hori
- Language: English
- Publication date: 2021
- Publication place: University of Hawaii Press
- Pages: 254
- ISBN: 9780824886790

Tales of Idolized Boys: Male-Male Love in Medieval Japanese Buddhist Narratives is a book about chigo written by Sachi Schmidt-Hori. It was published by the University of Hawaii Press in 2021.

== Contents ==
The book begins by explaining how the power dynamics of Shmidt-Hori's mother with her clients at a Kabukichō hostess club she worked at first influenced her into studying chigo tales. The book contain analyses of six of such tales, which she conducted through a historical and sociocultural perspective.

The book examines the dynamics of power, social status and age in medieval Japan. It also reviews the academic literature on chigo tales published after 1950.

== Reception ==
Margaret H. Childs wrote on Monumenta Nipponica that the book "takes the field [of chigo studies] far beyond previous interpretative work done in English by myself and others".

Sachiko Kawai, writing on the The Journal of Japanese Studies, described the book as " strong and special".
