= Koshikibu (two-volume otogi-zōshi) =

Koshikibu (小式部) is a Japanese otogi-zōshi in two volumes, probably composed at the end of the Muromachi period. To distinguish it from a slightly earlier work, it is conventionally known as Koshikibu (beppon) (小式部（別本）) in Japanese. It is one of a number of medieval setsuwa-type works whose protagonist is the Heian-era waka poet Koshikibu no Naishi. It survives in a single copy held by Toyo University.

== Date and genre ==
Koshikibu was probably composed at the end of the Muromachi period.

It is a work of the otogi-zōshi genre. It is also classified as a kajin-densetsu-mono (歌人伝説物), a work that recounts a legend about a waka poet, and a katoku-setsuwa (歌徳説話), a tale about the virtues of waka poetry.

Koshikibu follows in a long line of medieval setsuwa tales that had treated Koshikibu no Naishi ever since the Hōbutsushū in the twelfth century. The Mumyōzōshi had praised her as foremost among the talented women of the Heian court. This work attributes 16 waka (mostly songs from the oral tradition of uncertain origin) to her.

The work lacks some of the absurd and fantastic elements that characterize medieval otogi-zōshi, and more closely draws upon conventional setsuwa literature and the headnotes seen in imperial anthologies of waka poetry. It also includes wholly original content, such as Koshikibu being a gift from the god of Sumiyoshi (住吉明神).

== Title ==
There is another work, slightly earlier and existing in one volume as opposed to two, of the same title. Masahiko Hayashi's 1983 article on the present work for the Nihon Koten Bungaku Daijiten refers to that work as Koshikibu and this one as Koshikibu (beppon) to distinguish them.

== Plot ==
Long ago, in the time of Emperor Ichijō, there was a beautiful court lady called Koshikibu no Naishi. Her father was Tachibana no Michisada, and her mother was Izumi Shikibu, who had prayed to the gods and buddhas to bless her with a child. After the death of her father, she and her mother went with Fujiwara no Yasumasa to Tango Province. One day, on hearing her mother hum a nostalgic song, she rewrote the song and deeply impressed her mother.

Around the time of her sixteenth year she went to serve at court. While there, she took part in an uta-awase contest at the palace, and when her poetic skill was ridiculed by the middle counselor Fujiwara no Sadayori, she responded by composing her famous poem Ōe-yama ikuno no michi no tookereba mada fumi mo mizu ama no hashidate. This poem caught the attention of the Horikawa Minister of the Right, Fujiwara no Yorimune.Later, at Rokujō no Zensai-in's uta-awase she again earned herself more prestige as a poet.

When Koshikibu composed a waka and presented it as an offering to pray for Fujiwara no Norimichi, who had fallen ill, Norimichi was miraculously cured, and the two developed a strong relationship. She herself then fell victim to an epidemic, but when she composed the poem Ika ni sen yuku beki kata mo omooezu oya ni kikidatsu michi o shiraneba, she recovered through divine intervention.

== Textual tradition ==
According to Masahiko Hayashi's 1983 article, the only known surviving copy is the Nara e-hon in the holdings of Toyo University. It is in two volumes.

== Works cited ==
- Hayashi, Masahiko (1983). "Koshikibu (beppon)". Nihon Koten Bungaku Daijiten 日本古典文学大辞典 (in Japanese). Vol. 2. Tokyo: Iwanami Shoten. p. 606. OCLC 11917421.
