= Koshikibu (one-volume otogi-zōshi) =

Koshikibu (小式部) is a Japanese otogi-zōshi from the late Muromachi period. It is also known as The Tale of Izumi Shikibu (和泉式部の物語 Izumi Shikibu no monogatari).

== Title ==
Koshikibu is also known in some incomplete manuscripts as Izumi Shikibu no monogatari. The primary title Koshikibu refers to Koshikibu no Naishi, but the work is actually about three generations in the family, including her mother Izumi Shikibu and grandmother Murasaki Shikibu.

== Genre and date ==
Koshikibu is a work of the otogi-zōshi genre. It is also classified as a kajin-densetsu-mono (歌人伝説物), a work that recounts a legend about a waka poet, and a katoku-setsuwa (歌徳説話), a tale about the virtues of waka poetry (see Setsuwa).

The work incorporates a number of folk-tales that were apparently in circulation about its various character, and shares several elements in common with other otogi-zōshi such as Izumi Shikibu, Shuten-dōji and the other Koshikibu.

It was composed in the late Muromachi period.

== Plot ==
The work portrays Murasaki Shikibu, Izumi Shikibu and Koshikibu no Naishi as three generations of the same family.

Murasaki, an ingenious lady-in-waiting at the imperial court, one night has a strange dream and becomes pregnant. She gives birth to a baby girl, who from a young age displays a prodigious ability to compose waka poetry. Murasaki goes to Ishiyama-dera and composes the sixty-book Tale of Genji. In the spring of her thirteenth year, Murasaki's daughter falls ill and is thought to be approaching death, but she puts her faith in the virtue of poetry and her disease is cured. Both mother and daughter serve Jōtōmon-in, and the daughter becomes known as Izumi Shikibu.

At around this time there is a demon in the capital called Shuten-dōji, who every night steals people away. The demon is defeated by Minamoto no Raikō and Fujiwara no Yasumasa, and Yasumasa becomes Izumi's lover. There are also rumours of Izumi having an affair with Dōmyō, a famous poet in the capital, but these rumours are dispelled by the power of Izumi's poetry. In the spring of her seventeenth year, she gives birth to a baby girl, but is so ashamed of how she will be thought of at court that she abandons her child. Her daughter is found by an old couple in Kawachi Province, who raise her. Her daughter, too, grows into a waka and renga prodigy, and is a filial daughter.

Izumi Shikibu grows to a lonely old age, but is reunited with her daughter through poetry. Her daughter comes to the capital and is such a brilliant poet that she moves the people there greatly, and is given the title Koshikibu no Naishi.

== Textual tradition ==
The work is in one volume. There is a copy in the holdings of the Tenri Central Library, and a Nara e-hon. There is a scroll dating to around the end of the Muromachi period that includes only the latter half of this text, which bears the title Izumi Shikibu no monogatari.

== Works cited ==
- Hayashi, Masahiko (1983). "Koshikibu^{2}". Nihon Koten Bungaku Daijiten 日本古典文学大辞典 (in Japanese). Vol. 2. Tokyo: Iwanami Shoten. p. 606. OCLC 11917421.
