= Sachi Schmidt-Hori =

- Occupation: Associate professor

Academic background
- Thesis: Hyperfemininities, Hypermasculinities, and Hypersexualities in Classical Japanese Literature (2012)
- Doctoral advisor: Paul S. Atkins

Academic work
- Institutions: Dartmouth College

Sachi Schmidt-Hori is an American professor of Japanese literature and culture in Dartmouth College. She is the author of the 2021 book Tales of Idolized Boys: Male-Male Love in Medieval Japanese Buddhist Narratives.
