= Manabu Murakami (scholar) =

Manabu Murakami (shinjitai 村上 学, kyūjitai 村上 學, Murakami Manabu; born 1936) is a Japanese scholar specializing in medieval Japanese literature.

== Publications ==
- Murakami, Manabu (June 1966). "Otogi-zōshi Tenjin no Honji Nōto (I): Honmon Keitō Suitei Sagyō Hōkoku" お伽草子「天神本地」ノート（一）―本文系統推定作業報告―. Nagoya University Journal of Japanese Language and Literature (in Japanese). 18. Nagoya University: 25–44.
- Murakami, Manabu (November 1967). "Otogi-zōshi Tenjin no Honji Nōto (II)" お伽草子「天神本地」ノート（二）. Nagoya University Journal of Japanese Language and Literature (in Japanese). 21. Nagoya University: 43–51.
