= Utatane no Sōshi =

Utatane no Sōshi (転寝の草紙) is a Japanese otogi-zōshi from the Muromachi period.

== Genre, authorship and date ==
Utatane no Sōshi is a work of the otogi-zōshi genre. Tradition attributes it to a daughter of the 15th-century courtier and poet Asukai Masachika. One of the surviving manuscripts, an emakimono (illustrated hand-scroll), was contained in a box whose inscription crediting two mid-15th-century men as responsible for the manuscript: Tosa Mitsunobu is credited with the illustrations and Iio Mototsura (飯尾元連, 1431–1492) with the calligraphy. Although this dates the manuscript, the work itself may be older, as its depiction of courtly life evokes the Heian period more than the chaos of the Sengoku period.

== Plot ==
The work opens by quoting a waka poem of Ono no Komachi, utatane ni / koishiki hito wo / miteshi yori / yume chō mono wa / tanomi someteki, which portrays the poet longing for her lost lover coming to believe in her dreams as they are the only place where she can meet him. The female protagonist, a lonely young noblewoman, receives a romantic gift in a dream, but is unable to identify her dream suitor. When she next sleeps, she dreams that she meets the young man, described as fairer than Shining Genji, but she is still unable to learn his identity before he says he must leave.

Distraught, the lady determines to visit Ishiyama-dera and pray to Kannon, and sets out on foot in a fashion that mirrors Tamazakura from The Tale of Genji. At the temple, she encounters a man, named Sadaishō, who has the same voice as the figure in her dream, and listens in on his conversation with another man. She overhears the man say that he has seen a beautiful woman in his dreams and longs to meet her in reality. The lady decides that it would be unseemly to reveal herself to the man, choosing to place her faith in Kannon instead.

Later, while visiting an associate, she falls off a bridge into a river. Shrieking for help, she is saved by a boat that happens to be passing by. On the boat is Sadaishō, who is overcome by her beauty; she forgets her embarrassment, and the two are united. There descendants are said to prosper.

== Works cited ==
- Keene, Donald (1999) [1993]. A History of Japanese Literature, Vol. 1: Seeds in the Heart – Japanese Literature from Earliest Times to the Late Sixteenth Century (paperback ed.). New York, NY: Columbia University Press. ISBN 978-0-231-11441-7.
