= Sanjō Wasan =

Collection of three hymns written by Jōdo Shinshū founder Shinran

The Sanjō Wasan (三帖和讃) is a collection of three Japanese hymns written by Jōdo Shinshū founder, Shinran. Alternative English titles have been given such as the "Three Eulogies" and "Three Pure Land Poems." The Sanjō Wasan was formally designated a National Treasure of Japan.

The text consists of the Jōdo Wasan (浄土和讃 Hymns of the Pure Land), Kōso Wasan (高僧和讃 Hymns of the Pure Land Masters) and Shōzōmatsu Wasan (正像末和讃 Hymns of the Dharma Ages).

== Jōdo Wasan ==
The Jōdo Wasan is composed of 118 verses, classified as follows:

- Prefatory Hymns (1-2)
- Hymns Based on Gathas in Praise of Amitābha Buddha (3-50)
- Hymns on the Larger Sutra (51-72)
- Hymns on the Contemplation Sutra (73-81)
- Hymns on the Amitābha Sutra (82-86)
- Hymns to Amitābha Based on Various Sutras (87-95)
- Hymns on Benefits in the Present (96-110)
- Hymns on Mahāsthāmaprāpta (111-118)

== Kōso Wasan ==
The Kōso Wasan is composed of 119 verses, classified as follows:

- Nagarjuna Bodhisattva (1-10)
- Vasubandhu Bodhisattva (11-20)
- Master Tan-luan (21-54)
- Master Daochuo (55-61)
- Master Shandao (62-87)
- Master Genshin (88-97)
- Master Genkū (98-117)
- Concluding Hymns (118-119)

== Shōzōmatsu Wasan ==
The Shōzōmatsu Wasan is composed of 116 verses, classified as follows:

- Hymn on the Prophetic Dream (Prefatory Hymn) (1)
- Pure Land Hymns on the Right, Semblance, and Last Dharma Ages (2-59)
- Hymns on the Offense of Doubting the Primal Vow (60-82)
- Hymns in Praise of Prince Shōtoku (83-93)
- Gutoku’s Hymns of Lament and Reflection (94-109)
- Hymns on Zenkō-ji (Also called the "Additional Hymns of Lament on the Term Hotoke") (110-114)
- Section on Jinen Hōni (and Concluding Hymns) (115-116)
