= Eiga Ittei =

Eiga Ittei (詠歌一体, also read Eiga no Ittei or Eiga Ittai) is a book of poetic theory written by the Japanese waka poet Fujiwara no Tameie in the Kamakura period. It falls within the karon genre. It has a large number of alternate titles, including Waka Ittei, Kadō no Sho, Waka Hishō, Sanken Hiketsu and Yakumo Kuden.

It provides advice to its readers, presumed to be beginner students of waka composition, in eight sections, and bears similarities to other poetic theory works by Tameie's father, Fujiwara no Teika, and grandfather, Fujiwara no Shunzei.

== Authorship and date ==
Eiga Ittei was written by the poet Fujiwara no Tameie.

The work's date of composition, if one believes the postscript attached to the rufubon (popular) text, is the Kōchō period (1261–1264), although it has also been dated by scholars to 1275. (Note: Daijisen places the date at "around 1263 or 1270".)

== Title ==
The work is normally known by the title Eiga Ittei, but it has a large number of alternate titles, including:

- Waka Ittei (和歌一体)
- Kadō no Sho (歌道之書)
- Waka Hishō (和歌秘抄)
- Sanken Hiketsu (三賢秘決)
- Yakumo Kuden (八雲口伝) (Note: "Yakumo" is a synonym for "waka", and is an allusion to the first poem cited in the Kojiki, attributed to Susanoo no Mikoto and described in Ki no Tsurayuki's Kana Preface to the Kokinshū as the first waka.)

The common name can also be read as Eiga Ittai or Eiga no Ittei.

== Contents ==
The kōbon (広本) text begins with a preface that advises the reader on the value of practice (稽古) over natural ability and knowledge (才学).

The text then goes on to give its reader an introduction to eight topics relating to waka composition:

- it advises readers to thoroughly familiarize themselves with the dai (topic) of the poem to be composed (題詠論);
- it addresses the difference between composing poetry in different contexts;
- fūtei (風体);
- engo (縁語);
- ji-amari (字余り);
- jōgo (畳語, literally "reduplication");
- nushi-aru kotoba (主ある詞); and
- honka-dori (本歌取り).

In terms of its general advice to its readers, it is heavily dependent on the earlier works of Fujiwara no Shunzei (Tameie's grandfather), Fujiwara no Teika (Tameie's father) and Fujiwara no Kiyosuke, but it is independently noteworthy for its emphasis on practice, which reflects a more medieval dō.

== Textual tradition ==
There are two principal textual lines: the Reizei text and the Nijō text. The latter bears a postscript by Fujiwara no Tameuji, and is the rufubon (popular) text. The postscript for the former was written by Reizei Tamesuke and Reizei Tamehide.

The Reizei text was only copied in the pre-modern period in manuscript form, with copies in the possession of Akita University, Kono Art Museum, (Note: Referred to in Satō (1983, p. 330) as the Imabari Kono Nobukazu Memorial Culture Museum (今治河野信一記念文化館 Imabari Kōno Nobukazu Kinen Bunka-kan).) the National Diet Archives, the Tokugawa Art Museum, the Yōmei Archives and others.

Manuscripts of the Nijō text survive in the possession of Tenri Central Library, the Sonkei-kaku Archives and others, and the text was also printed in 1696 and entered circulation in several compilations of books waka theory.

== Works cited ==
- "yakumo". Daijirin (in Japanese). Sanseidō. 2006.
- "Eiga Ittei" 詠歌一体. Daijisen (in Japanese). Shogakukan. 1998.
- Satō, Tsuneo (1983). "Eiga Ittei". Nihon Koten Bungaku Daijiten 日本古典文学大辞典 (in Japanese). Vol. 1. Tokyo: Iwanami Shoten. p. 330. OCLC 11917421.
