= Kenreimon-in Ukyō no Daibu =

Japanese noblewoman & poet

Kenreimon-in Ukyō no Daibu (建礼門院右京大夫) was a Japanese noblewoman and waka poet of the late Heian and early Kamakura periods.

== Biography ==
She was a daughter of Fujiwara no Koreyuki and Yūgiri (夕霧), a daughter of Ōga no Motomasa and a renowned koto player. It has been postulated that she was born in Hōgen 5 (1157). In 1173, she entered the service of Taira no Tokuko, then empress to Emperor Takakura. She may have come to court under the patronage of Fujiwara no Shunzei. Her mother had previously given birth to a son, Son'en (尊円), by Shunzei, before marrying Koreyuki and taking Son'en with her into Koreyuki's house, and Ukyō no Daibu's nickname (literally "Ukyō High Steward") comes from the political post held by Shunzei at the time she came to court. She served less than six years as a lady-in-waiting, but during this time she began a love affair with Taira no Sukemori, and also took Fujiwara no Takanobu as a lover.

Takanobu was the son of Fujiwara no Tametsune and Bifukumon-in no Kaga, who later married Shunzei, so it is possible that Takanobu's mother and foster-father were involved in the relationship. In around the autumn of 1178, she left court and went to live with her mother, but the following year her mother fell ill and died, and Ukyō no Daibu went to live with her half-brother Son'en in the Nishiyama district of the Capital. Her relationship with Takanobu came to an end around this time, and she came to rely on the love of Sukemori. With the growing tensions between the Taira and their rival Minamoto clan, however, their relationship was short-lived.

The Taira were driven from the Capital in the seventh month of 1183 (according to the traditional Japanese calendar), and Sukemori left her, before drowning at the Battle of Dan-no-Ura in 1185. Ukyō no Daibu heard the news of her lover's death, and later entered religious orders along with her brother at Hosshō-ji (ja). She went on treasuring the memory of her lover Sukemori, but around a decade later, in 1196 or 1197, she went back to the court of Emperor Go-Toba, and then entered the service of the empress dowager Shichijō-in. She lived until at least 1233, but her date of death is unknown.

== Writings ==
=== Poetry ===
She left a personal anthology, the Kenreimon-in Ukyō no Daibu Shū (建礼門院右京大夫集).

23 of her poems were included in imperial collections from the Shin-chokusenshū on, and her poems were also included in the Fuboku Wakashō (夫木和歌抄), the Gyokuyōshū and others. The ten poems by her that were included in the Gyokuyōshū are indicative of both her individual poetic style and the style of that anthology. These poems can all duplicates of those in her personal collection, but the two poems included in Jien's Shūgyokushū (拾玉集) and the Tsukimōde Wakashū (月詣和歌集) are not found in her personal anthology.

=== Other works ===
It has been hypothesized that Yamaji no Tsuyu, the unofficial sequel to The Tale of Genji, was written by her.

== Works cited ==
- Hon'ida, Shigemi (1983a). "Kenreimon-in Ukyō no Daibu". Nihon Koten Bungaku Daijiten 日本古典文学大辞典 (in Japanese). Vol. 2. Tokyo: Iwanami Shoten. pp. 464–465. OCLC 11917421.
- Hon'ida, Shigemi (1983b). "Kenreimon-in Ukyō no Daibu Shū". Nihon Koten Bungaku Daijiten (in Japanese). Vol. 2. Tokyo: Iwanami Shoten. p. 465. OCLC 11917421.
