= Aisome-gawa (otogi-zōshi) =

Aisome-gawa (藍染川, "Aisome River") is an anthology of Japanese short stories, or an otogi-zōshi. The text dates to the Muromachi period, and survives in a single manuscript in the possession of the Keiō University Library. It is an adaptation of an eponymous Noh play.

== Genre and date ==
Aisome-gawa is a work of the otogi-zōshi genre. It is an adaptation of the story of the Noh play of the same name.

The sole surviving manuscript was likely copied in the late Muromachi period.

== Plot ==
A woman named Umetsubo no Jijū (梅壺の侍従) makes her way from the capital to the Dazaifu Tenmangū accompanied by her daughter Umechiyo, in order to meet the high priest of the Tenmangū. Umetsubo no Jijū asks her innkeeper, Sakon no Jō (左近尉), to deliver a letter to the priest for her.

The priest's wife orders Sakon no Jō to send the two away, but he decides to protect them and hide them away somewhere. Jijū asks Sakon no Jō and his wife to take care of Umechiyo, while she kills herself by jumping into the Aisome River.

Umechiyo attempts to follow her mother into death but is prevented by Sakon no Jō's family. The priest happens to see this, and when he hears what his wife has done is greatly angered. He meets with Sakon no Jō's family and, when he learns of Umetsubo no Jijū's fate, decides to become a monk and cede his priestly position to Umechiyo.

== Textual tradition ==
Aisome-gawa is in one book. The work survives in a single manuscript copy in the holdings of the Keiō University Library. This manuscript includes ink-coloured illustrations and likely dates to the late Muromachi period. The copy lacks a title, and the opening portion is missing.

The work was later printed in around the Kanbun era (1661–1673) in two volumes. This edition included illustrations, and its title was written in a combination of hiragana and kanji as あゐそめ川.

== Works cited ==
- Tokue, Gensei (1983). "Aisome-gawa^{2}". Nihon Koten Bungaku Daijiten 日本古典文学大辞典 (in Japanese). Vol. 1. Tokyo: Iwanami Shoten. p. 5. OCLC 11917421.
