= Sōkyū =

Sōkyū (宗久, dates unknown) was a Japanese Buddhist monk and waka poet of the Nanbokuchō period. His secular name (俗名) was Ōtomo Yoriyasu (大友頼資).

== Poetry ==
Four of his waka were included in imperial anthologies such as the Shinshūi Wakashū and the Shingoshūi Wakashū.

== Other writings ==
He wrote the travel diary Miyako no Tsuto (都のつと).

== General references ==
- "Sōkyū" 宗久. Nihon Jinmei Daijiten Plus (in Japanese). Kodansha. 2015.
