= Ichiko Teiji =

Japanese medievalist

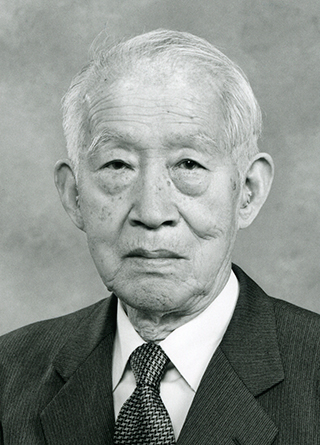
Ichiko in an undated picture

Ichiko Teiji (市古 貞次, 1934–2004) was a Japanese literary medievalist and University of Tokyo professor. He is best known for his research on otogi-zoshi. He was the first director of the National Institute of Japanese Literature and received an Order of Culture in 1990.
