= Aki no Yo no Naga Monogatari =

Aki no Yo no Naga Monogatari (秋夜長物語) is a Japanese otogi-zōshi from the Nanbokuchō period.

== Genre, authorship and date ==
Aki no Yo no Naga Monogatari is a work of the otogi-zōshi genre.

The work's author is unknown. A 1716 printed edition attributes the work to the fourteenth-century monk and Confucianist Gen'e-hōin, but this is dubious. Its writing style resembles that of the famous war chronicle Taiheiki, and an old manuscript of the work, the Eiwa-bon dating to 1377, is written on the reverse of a copy of the Taiheiki. Ryūshin Matsumoto, in his article on Aki no Yo no Naga Monogatari for the 1983 Nihon Koten Bungaku Daijiten, speculated that on this basis the attribution to Gen'e may not be without merit.

Based on the existence of the Eiwa-bon, the work must date to the Nanbokuchō period at the latest.

== Plot ==
The Enryaku-ji monk Keikai (桂海) visits Mii-dera and falls in love with Umewaka (梅若), the son of the Hanazono Minister of the Left (花園左大臣), but Umewaka is carried off by a tengu. The monks of Mii-dera, searching for the boy, fight with Enryaku-ji and burn the temple building. Umewaka returns safely, but learning what has happened he commits suicide. Keikai mourns for Umewaka and turns for comfort to the revered Tendai monk Sensei-shōnin (瞻西上人).

== Textual tradition ==
The work is in one volume. There are a great many extant manuscripts, and these are divided into five groups based on their significant textual variations.

The first group includes the above-discussed Eiwa-bon, an Eiwa 3 (1377) manuscript held by the late Isao Kōjō (高乗勲) and others.

The second group includes the Bunroku 5 manuscript in the holdings of the Dai-Tōkyū Kinen Bunko (大東急記念文庫) and others.

The third group includes the Muromachi-period illustrated text in the holdings of the Eisei Bunko (永青文庫) and others.

The fourth group includes the Tenbun 9 manuscript in the holdings of the Keio University library, the manuscript copied at the end of the Muromachi period in the holdings of the Tenri Central Library, and the katakana ko katsuji-bon (early printed edition).

The fifth group includes the hiragana ko katsuji 11-column printed edition, the 12-column edition of the same, the Kan'ei 19 printed edition, and the printed edition with illustrations dating from roughly the Man'ei or Kanbun eras (1658–1673).

== Works cited ==
- Akiya, Osamu (1994). "Aki no Yo no Naga Monogatari". Encyclopedia Nipponica (in Japanese). Shogakukan.
- Matsumoto, Ryūshin (1983). "Aki no Yo no Naga Monogatari". Nihon Koten Bungaku Daijiten 日本古典文学大辞典 (in Japanese). Vol. 1. Tokyo: Iwanami Shoten. pp. 26–27. OCLC 11917421.
