= Otogi-zōshi =

Japanese literary genre

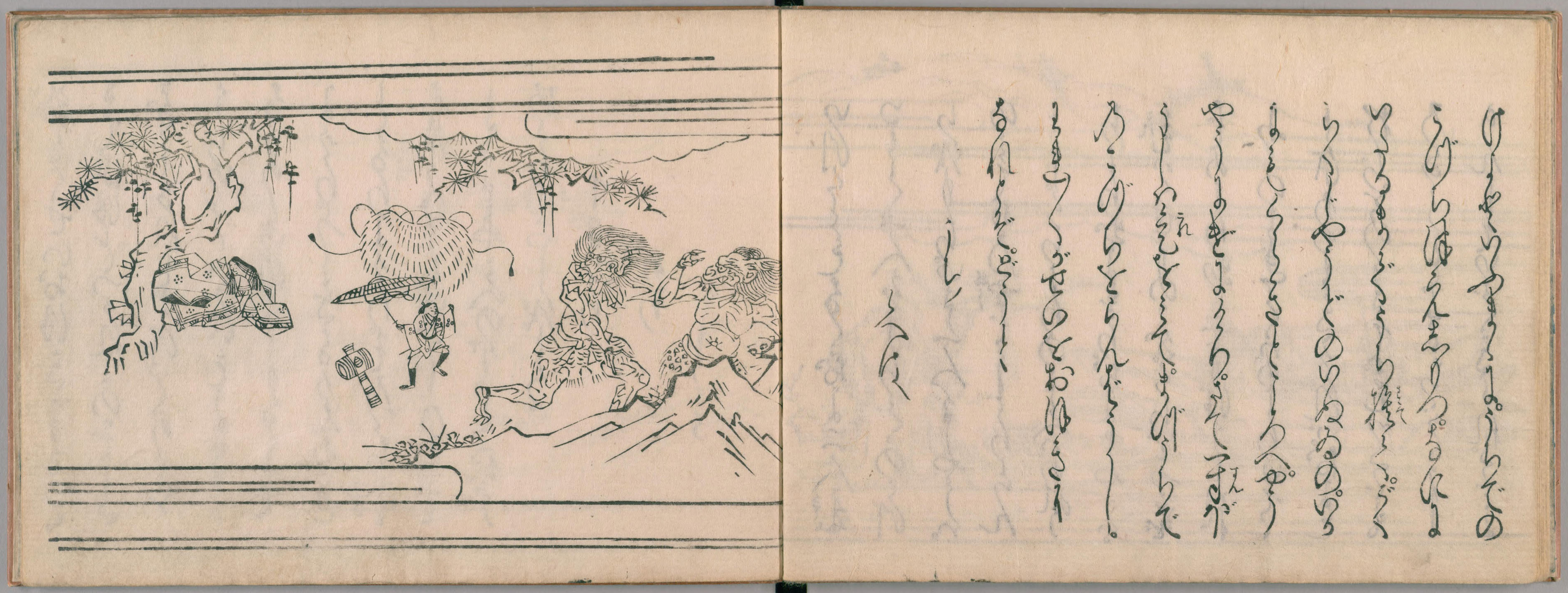
Illustration from otogi-zōshi tale, published c. 1725

Otogi-zōshi (御伽草子) are a group of about 350 Japanese prose narratives written primarily in the Muromachi period (1392–1573). These illustrated short stories, which remain unattributed, together form one of the representative literary genres of the Japanese medieval era.

== Overview ==
Otogi-zōshi is a general term for narrative literature written between the Muromachi period (approximately 1336–1573) and the beginning of the Edo period (1603–1867). The term originates with a mid-Edo collection of 23 stories, titled Otogi Bunko (御伽文庫) or Otogi-zōshi (御伽草紙/御伽草子). It later came to denote other works of the same genre and period. Modern scholarship sometimes distinguishes between "true" otogi-zōshi, covering only the 23 works included in the aforementioned collection, and other works that it instead terms Muromachi-jidai monogatari (室町時代物語) or chūsei shōsetsu (中世小説).

=== List ===
The 23 tales covered by the narrow definition are:

- Bunshō-zōshi (文正草子)
- Hachikazuki (鉢かづき)
- Komachi Sōshi (小町草紙)
- Onzōshi Shima-watari (御曹子島渡り)
- Karaito-zōshi (唐糸草紙)
- Kowata-gitsune (木幡狐)
- Nanakusa Sōshi (七草草紙)
- Saru Genji Sōshi (猿源氏草紙)
- Monokusa Tarō (物くさ太郎)
- Sazare-ishi (さざれ石)
- Hamaguri no Sōshi (蛤の草紙)
- Ko-Atsumori (小敦盛)
- Nijūshi-kō (二十四孝)
- Bontenkoku (梵天国)
- Nose-zaru Sōshi (のせ猿草子)
- Neko no Sōshi (猫の草紙)
- Hamade (浜出)
- Izumi Shikibu (和泉式部)
- Issun-bōshi (一寸法師)
- Saiki (さいき)
- Urashima Tarō (浦嶋太郎)
- Yokobue-zōshi (横笛草紙)
- Shutendōji (酒呑童子)

Under the broad definition, there are around 500 surviving examples of otogi-zōshi. Most are around 30–40 pages in length, and are of uncertain date. Their authors are also largely unknown, but whereas Heian and Kamakura monogatari were almost all composed by members of the aristocracy, these works were composed by not just aristocrats but also Buddhist monks, hermits, educated members of the warrior class. Some of the later otogi-zōshi may have been written by members of the emerging urban merchant class. Similarly, the works' intended readership was probably broader than the monogatari of earlier eras. They therefore have a wide variety of contents and draw material from various literary works of the past. Based on their contents, scholars have divided them into six genres:

1. kuge-mono (公家物)
2. shūkyō-mono (宗教物)
3. buke-mono (武家物)
4. shomin-mono (庶民物)
5. gaikoku-mono (外国物)
6. irui-mono (異類物)

=== Kuge-mono ===
Kuge-mono are tales of the aristocracy. They mark a continuation of the earlier monogatari literature, and are noted for the influence of The Tale of Genji. Many of them are rewritten or abridged versions of earlier works. Among the romantic works in this sub-genre are Shinobine Monogatari (忍音物語) and Wakakusa Monogatari (若草物語), and most end sadly with the characters cutting themselves off from society (hiren tonsei (悲恋遁世)).

== Categories ==
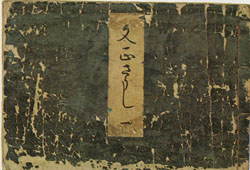
Cover from volume of otogi-zōshi tales, published c. 1725

Otogi-zōshi have been broken down into multiple categories: tales of the aristocracy, which are derived from earlier works such as The Tale of Genji; religious tales; tales of warriors, often based on The Tale of the Heike, the Taiheiki, The Tale of the Soga and the Gikeiki (The Tale of Yoshitsune); tales of foreign countries, based on the Konjaku Monogatarishū. The most well-known of the tales, however, are retellings of familiar legends and folktales, such as Issun-bōshi, the story of a one-inch-tall boy who overcomes countless obstacles to achieve success in the capital.

== Origins of the term otogi-zōshi ==
The term otogi literally means 'companion', with the full name of the genre translating to 'companion tale'. This designation, however, did not come into use until 1725, when a publisher in Osaka released a set of 23 illustrated booklets titled Shūgen otogibunko (Fortuitous Companion Library). As other publishers produced their own versions of Shūgen otogibunko, they began referring to the set of tales as otogi-zōshi. Gradually the term came to describe any work from the Muromachi or early Edo period that exhibited the same general style as the tales in Shūgen otogibunko.

== History of otogi-zōshi scholarship ==
Otogi-zōshi came to the attention of modern literary historians in the late 19th century. For the most part, scholars have been critical of this genre, dismissing it for its perceived faults when compared to the aristocratic literature of the Heian and Kamakura periods. As a result, standardized Japanese school textbooks often omit any reference to otogi-zōshi from their discussions of medieval Japanese literature. Recent studies, however, have contradicted this critical stance, highlighting the vitality and inherent appeal of this underappreciated genre. The term chusei shosetsu ('medieval novels'), coined by eminent scholar Ichiko Teiji, attempts to situate the tales within a narrative continuum.

== List of otogi-zōshi ==
- Aisome-gawa
- Aki no Yo no Naga Monogatari
- Ame no Wakahiko sōshi
- Komachi Sōshi
- Koshikibu (I)
- Koshikibu (II)
- Urashima Tarō (otogi-zōshi)
- Utatane no Sōshi

== Works cited ==
- Ichiko, Teiji (1983). "Otogi-zōshi". Nihon Koten Bungaku Daijiten 日本古典文学大辞典 (in Japanese). Vol. 1. Tokyo: Iwanami Shoten. pp. 498–499. OCLC 11917421.
