= Heian literature =

Overview of Japanese literature of the Heian period

Heian literature (平安文学, Heian-bungaku) or Chūko literature (中古文学, chūko-bungaku; "mid-ancient literature") refers to Japanese literature of the Heian period, running from 794 to 1185. This article summarizes its history and development.

== Overview ==
Kanshi (poetry written in Chinese) and kanbun (prose in Chinese) had remained popular since the Nara period, and the influence of the Tang poet Bai Juyi (Haku Kyoi in Japanese) on Japanese kanshi in this period was great. Even in the Tale of Genji, a pure Japanese work composed entirely in kana, particularly in the chapter "Kiritsubo", the influence of his Song of Everlasting Regret has been widely recognized. Sugawara no Michizane, who taught at the Daigaku-ryō before becoming Minister of the Right, was known not only as a politician but as a leading kanshi poet.

In 905, with the imperial order to compile the Kokinshū, the first imperial anthology, waka poetry acquired a status comparable to kanshi. Waka were composed at uta-awase and other official events, and the private collections of well-known poets such as Ki no Tsurayuki (the Tsurayuki-shū) and Lady Ise (the Ise-shū) became well known.

During this period, since the language of most official documents was Chinese, most men of the nobility used Chinese characters to write poetry and prose in Chinese, but among women the kana syllabary continued to grow in popularity, and more and more men adopted this simpler style of writing as well. Most of the works of literature from the Heian period that are still well-regarded today were written predominantly in kana. Diaries had been written by men in Chinese for some time, but in the early tenth century Ki no Tsurayuki chose to write his Tosa Nikki from the standpoint of a woman, in kana. Partly due to the Tosa Nikki's influence, diaries written in Japanese became increasingly common.

== Timeline of notable works ==
- 797 – Shoku Nihongi by Fujiwara no Tsuginawa, Sugano no Mamichi et al. (history)
- 807 - Kogo Shūi by Inbe no Hironari (Inbe clan history)
- 814 – Ryōunshū, compiled by Ono no Minemori, Sugawara no Kiyotomo et al. (kanshi anthology)
- 815 – Shinsen Shōjiroku by Prince Manda (万多親王, Manda-shinnō), et al. (genealogy)
- 818 – Bunka Shūreishū, compiled by Fujiwara no Fuyutsugu, Sugawara no Kiyotomo et al. (kanshi anthology)
- 824 – Nihon Ryōiki by Kyōkai (景戒; also pronounced Keikai) (setsuwa anthology)
- 827 – Keikokushū, compiled by Yoshimine no Yasuyo, Sugawara no Kiyotomo et al. (kanshi anthology)
- 833 - Ryō no gige a commentary of the Yoro code and the source of information that modern scholars use to reconstruct law from the Heian period and Nara period
- 835 – Shōryōshū by Kūkai (kanshi/kanbun anthology)
- 841 – Nihon Kōki by Fujiwara no Otsugu et al. (history)
- 847 - Ennin's Diary
- 868 - Ryo no Shuge a private commentary on the yoro codes had no legal effect like Ryō no Gige. It was written by Naomoto Koremun, a lawyer. Though 50 volumesoriginally, it is now 35.
- 869 – Shoku Nihon Kōki
- 879 – Toshi Bunshū by Miyako no Yoshika. a personal poetry collection but it also includes important imperial documents from his time at court and historical information about Sugawara no Michizane
- 879 - Hatashi Honkeicho the history of the hata set of shrines there formation submitted to the imperial court.
- 879 - Nihon Montoku Tennō Jitsuroku (history)
- 891 - Nihonkoku Genzaisho Mokuroku a book catalog of Chinese books written by Fujiwara no Sukeyo after a fire had destroyed these books. Some of these Chinese books no longer exist today. see List of National Treasures of Japan (writings: Classical Chinese books) for more information on imported books
- 892 - Ruijū Kokushi (history)
- 900 – Kanke Bunsō by Sugawara no Michizane (kanshi/kanbun anthology)
- 901 - Nihon Sandai Jitsuroku (history)
- 903 - Kanke Kōshū by Sugawara no Michizane (kanshi/kanbun anthology) written before his death while in exile and was shown to Ki no Haseo after being sent
- 905 – Kokin Wakashū - compiled by Ki no Tsurayuki, Ki no Tomonori, Ōshikōchi no Mitsune and Mibu no Tadamine on the orders of Emperor Daigo (chokusen wakashū)
- Before 910 – Taketori Monogatari (author unknown; monogatari)
- 913 - Shinsen Manyoshu
- 927 - Engishiki
- 935 – Tosa Nikki by Ki no Tsurayuki (diary)
- 939 - Teishinkoki
- (date unknown) - Ise Monogatari (uta monogatari)
- 951 - Gosen Wakashū
- 951 - Yamato monogatari
- 952 - Heichu Monogatari
- 962 - Tonomine Shosho Monogatari
- 972 - Toyokage Monogatari
- 973 - Shinsen Kisoki the first text of Japanese turtle shell divination completed in 973 but was compiled through 830.
- 974 - Kagerō Nikki
- 975 - Ochikubo Monogatari
- Before 977 – Utsubo Monogatari by Unknown
- 977 - Honin no Jiju Shu
- 980 - Sumiyoshi Monogatari it was a highly influential book read by Murasaki Shikibu and Sei Shōnagon
- 982 - Chiteiki
- 984 - Sanpo-e
- 984 - Zokusajosho the history of the Daijo-kan inherited by Otsuki. It compiles years 984 until the 7th year of the Genroku period of the Edo period. It has some 270 documents.
- 991 - Fujiwara no Sari hitsu shojō a letter by Fujiwara no sari
- 999 - Sanekata Shu Fujiwara no sanekata's personal poetry collection.
- 1002 – The Pillow Book by Sei Shōnagon (zuihitsu)
- 1004 - Izumi Shikibu Nikki by Izumi Shikibu a poetic diary
- 1005 - Shūi Wakashū
- 1008 – The Tale of Genji by Murasaki Shikibu (tsukuri-monogatari)
- 1008 - Political affairs summary a book detailing political affairs, it was completed in 1002 when Emperor Ichijo was ruling and updated until 1008. It was written by Tadasuke Koremune at the request of Fujiwara no Sanesuke out of 130 volumes 26 remain.
- 1010 - Murasaki Shikibu Nikki
- 1011 - Ruiju - Sandaikaku a collection of laws, a compilation of the lost Engi Kyaku. The author is unknown but Engi Kyaku is said to have been written by Tokihira Fujiwara as the head of editing.
- 1012 - Shinsen Zuinō by Fujiwara no kinto
- 1012 - Waka Kuhon by Fujiwara no kinto
- 1013 - Wakan rōeishū
- 1017 - Gonki a diary by Fujiwara no Yukinari
- 1020 – Sarashina Nikki by Takasue's daughter
- 1021 - Midō Kanpakuki the diary of Fujiwara no Michinaga
- 1030 - Gengenshu by Nōin
- 1031 - Hosshin Wakashu
- 1032 - shoyuki by Fujiwara no Sanesuke
- 1043 - Hokke Genki
- 1047 - Enoshima engi
- 1050 - Sakuteiki (the first garden manual)
- 1050 - Nōin Utamakura by Nōin
- 1055 - tsutsumi chunagon monogatari a book of short stories
- 1059 - Yoru no Nezame
- 1060 - Hamamatsu Chunagon Monogatari
- 1061 - Sagami-shū by sagami
- 1065 - Shinsarugakuki, a book presumed to be written by Fujiwara no Akihira. It is a book full of customs and possibly a biographical account but is often regarded as a work of fiction. It lists general references to each trade of Japan from performers of sarugaku to farmers.
- 1065 - Meigo Orai a book of model letters by Fujiwara no Akihira.
- 1076 - Sagoromo Monogatari
- 1081 - Suisaki a diary by Minamoto no Toshifusa
- 1086 - Goshūi Wakashū
- 1094 - Ruijufusensho a collection of laws. Tsuneyori Minamoto is said to have written it.
- 1099 - Go-Nijō Donoki (Moromichi Diary) a diary by Fujiwara no Moromichi
- 1100 - Rōei gōchū a commentary on the Wakan rōeishū by Ōe no Masafusa
- 1105 - Konjaku Monogatarish
- 1107 - Eiga Monogatari
- 1109 - Honchō shinsenden by Ōe no Masafusa
- 1109 - Sanuki no suke Nikki the diary of Sanuki no suke
- 1110 - Nezame monogatari emaki
- 1113 - Nishi Honganji Sanju-rokunin Kashu
- 1113 - ise Nikki
- 1113 - Saigū no Nyōgo Shū
- 1113 - Okikaze-shū
- 1120 – Ōkagami (author unknown; rekishi monogatari)
- 1120 – Konjaku Monogatarishū (compiler unknown; setsuwa anthology)
- 1127 – Kin'yō Wakashū, compiled by Minamoto no Toshiyori (chokusen wakashū)
- 1131 - Kohon Setsuwashu a recently discovered setsuwa (that was lost )
- 1133 - Hosouruirin a book of laws written by shinsai 4 volumes remain out of 230
- 1140 - Genji Monogatari Emaki
- 1142 - Kikki a diary by Tsunefusa yoshida (started in 1142 finished in 1200)
- 1144 - rin'yō wakashū a personal collection by Shun'e
- 1146 - Myobokanyosho a law book compiled and edited from old law books supposedly written by a monk named megumi
- 1150 - Chōjū-jinbutsu-giga
- 1150 - Kibi Daijin Nittō Emaki
- 1150 - Gaki-zoshi at the Kyoto National Museum
- 1150 - Jigokuzōji Hell scroll at the Nara National Museum
- 1150 - Hekija-E (Extermination of Evil)
- 1150 - Jigoku-zoshi Hell Scroll at the Tokyo National Museum
- 1151 – Shika Wakashū, compiled by Fujiwara no Akisuke (chokusen wakashū)
- 1151 - Sankaiki a diary by Nakayama Tadachika (started 1151 ended 1194)
- 1156 - Hogen monogatari
- 1157 - Shigisan Engi Emaki
- 1158 - Nenju gyōji emaki
- 1159 - Honcho Seiki (history)
- 1160 - heiji monogatari
- 1161 - Kirei Mondō a manual for writing letters by Nakayama Tadachika
- 1164 - Gyokuyo a diary by Kanezane kujo (started in 1164 finished in 1200)
- 1164 - Fujiwara no Tadamichi hitsushojōan a set of 25 letters by Fujiwara no Tadamichi said to be a manual for writing letters.
- 1165 - Kara monogatari a collection of tales from China
- 1169 - Fusō Ryakuki
- 1170 –Imakagami by Fujiwara no Tametsune (rekishi monogatari)
- 1170 - Torikaebaya Monogatari
- 1178 - Takakura tennō shinkan goshōsoku a letter by emperor takakura
- 1178 - Seigan-ji urabon engi a history of the ghost festival scroll
- 1180 - Takakura-in Itsukushima Gokōki a travel diary by Minamoto no Michichika
- 1180 - Saigyo Poems of a Mountain Home
- 1180 - Ryōjin Hishō
- 1180 - Meigetsuki
- 1181 - Kojijū-shū
- 1181 - Takakura-in Shōkaki a diary by Minamoto no michichika mourning the death of emperor takakura
- 1182 - Nijōin no Sanuki Shū
- 1183 - Kokawa-dera Engi Emaki
- 1184 - Ban Dainagon Ekotoba
- 1184 - Nijō Taikō Taigōgū no Daini shu
- 1185 - heike monogatari
- 1185 - takamura monogatari
- 1188 – Senzai Wakashū, compiled by Fujiwara no Shunzei on the command of Emperor Go-Shirakawa in 1183 it started to be compiled (chokusen-wakashū)
