= Kaoru Genji =

Fictional character from The Tale of Genji

Kaoru
- The Tale of Genji character
- Created by: Murasaki Shikibu

In-universe information
- Species: Human
- Gender: Male
- Family: Kashiwagi (father), Onna san no miya (mother)
- Nationality: Japanese

Kaoru is a fictional character in The Tale of Genji (Genji Monogatari). He only appears as the lead for the novel's third act, called the 'Uji Jujo' (Uji Chapters). Kaoru has been called the first anti-hero in literature and is known for always having a strange but pleasant smell around him. He is known to be comparatively calculated and calm, and somewhat of an overthinker, as opposed to his love rival and close friend, Niou, who happens to be more "passionate" than he is.

He is the son of the protagonist of the first two acts, Hikaru Genji's wife, "Third Princess" (known as "Onna san no miya" in the Seidensticker version, or "Nyōsan" in Waley's), and Genji's nephew Kashiwagi. Kaoru is known to the world as Genji's son even though he was in fact fathered by Genji's nephew.

Kaoru's story revolves around his love affairs with princesses Oigimi, Naka no kimi, and Ukifune, as well as his rivalry with Niou. Unlike acts one and two where the women of the story gravitated to the charismatic and assertive Hikaru Genji, Kaoru is portrayed with hesitancy and compunction towards his love interests. Through a series of unfortunate events, as well as his own flaws, Kaoru ends up hurting the people he loves including Oigimi and Ukifune.

The final chapters of the Tale of Genji abruptly end, with Kaoru wondering if the lady he loves, Ukifune, is being hidden away by Niou, an imperial prince and the son of Genji's daughter, the current Empress now that Reizei has abdicated the throne.

== Development ==
Kaoru is known to the world as the late Genji's and Onna san no miya's son, but biologically, his real father is Genji's nephew, Kashiwagi. When he learns that his real father is Kashiwagi, he continues to venerate the memory of Hachinomiya (the 8th Prince) as a self-chosen father figure. The learning of this secret drives his obsessiveness with the past, seeking to comprehend it and atone for the sins of his parents, rather than devote himself to the promiscuity and procreation expected of him by society: "longing to know the facts of his birth, Kaoru prayed that he might one day have a clear explanation".

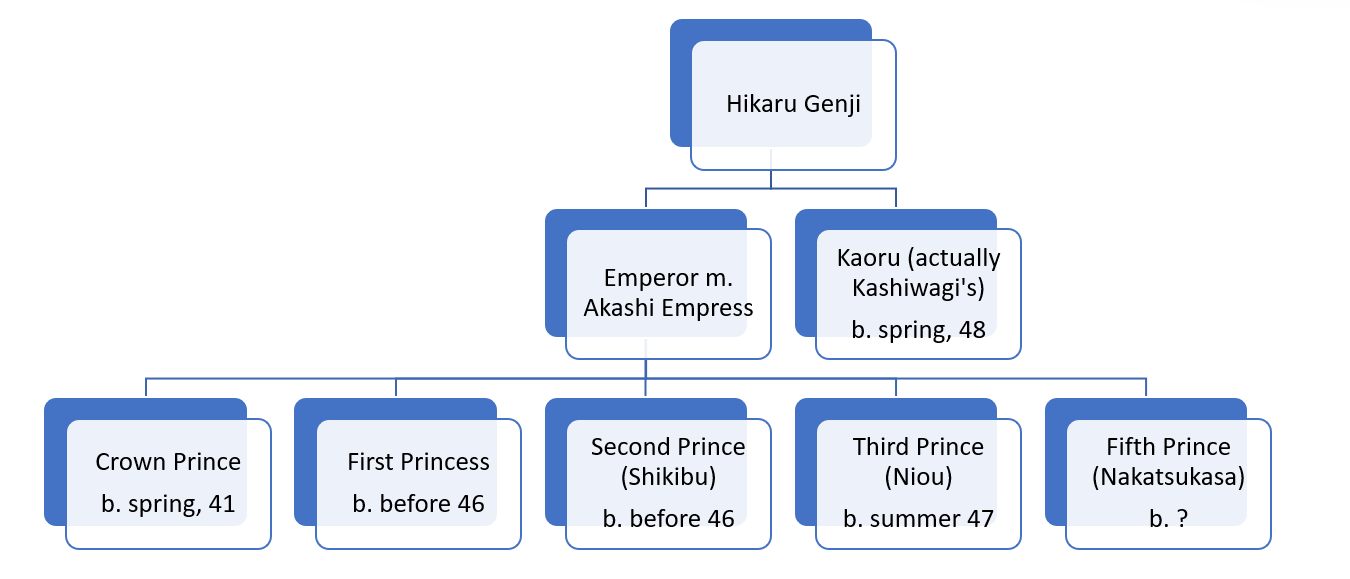
The genealogy of The Tale of Genji.

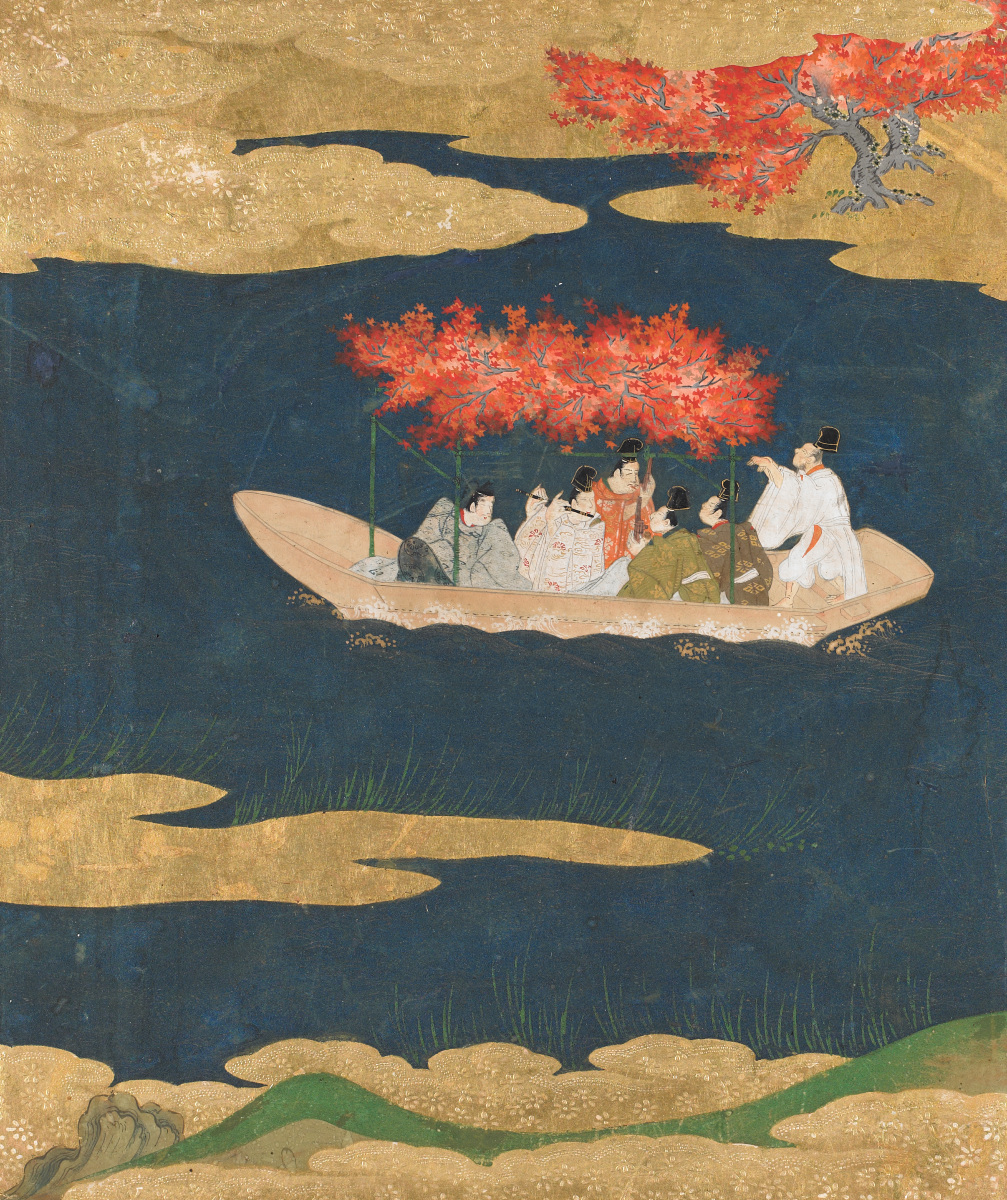
Agemaki (Trefoil Knots) Tale of Genji Chapter 47 – BMA

In chapter 45, ‘Hashihime’, Hachinomiya hopes that Kaoru will look after his daughters, Oigimi and Naka no kimi. Kaoru interpreted this as an approval to marry Oigimi (or both sisters), and the environment certainly implied the eventual marriage between the two. The whole household believes this because they often heard him say, "often enough that, should [Kaoru] be so inclined, he would very gladly see [Oigimi] that well settled". Kaoru falls in love with Oigimi in chapter 47, ‘Agemaki’, however, Oigimi eventually dies from self-starvation after discovering that Naka no kimi, who she hoped would become Kaoru's wife, slept with Niou.

In his grieving state, Kaoru copes unhealthily by means of substitution; finding another who can fill the hole that was left in his heart by Oigimi's death. Naka no kimi, Oigimi's younger sister is seemingly the perfect substitution, as he tells Naka no kimi that he longs to "make a doll [hitogata] in [Oigimi’s] likeness… and pursue my devotions before [it]". Kaoru's infatuation with Naka no kimi is short-lived, however, as she tells him about Ukifune, the illegitimate daughter of Hachinomiya and her younger, half-sister, who likewise bears a striking resemblance to the late Oigimi. Kaoru falls in love with Ukifune, who later attempts suicide, but survives and becomes a nun. At the end of the third act, Kaoru is distraught and desperate for Ukifune to return to his side once more after discovering her survival, however she turns him down. Thus, Kaoru's journey is sombre and tragically inclined and his love is not a source of joy, but rather, of anxiety and suffering.

After having experienced the death of Oigimi and the rejection of Ukifune, Kaoru ends as a pitiful character who hurt the people he loved. His complicated birth and flawed characteristics contrasted the heroics of the previous protagonist, Hikaru Genji, and Murasaki's establishment of the character as a pathetic caught between renunciation and desire, kindness and cruel circumstance marked him as an anti-hero. At the end of the novel, Kaoru gains the image of a depressed hero, after having two failed relationships with Oigimi and Ukifune. His character construction later influences the subsequent dynasty women's writings such as the Sagoromo Monogatari and Tsutsumi Chunagon Monogatari, and other scented heroes in the latter half of the Heian period in Japan.

== Characteristics ==
Kaoru is kind, steadfast, thoughtful, tactful, deeply pious and leans towards Buddhism. His sexual tact, discretion or diffidence contrasts Genji's daring, resourcefulness, and swiftness regarding romantic affairs. This characteristic of Kaoru's may have been favoured by other authors of the Heian period as in the Mumyozoshi (a late twelfth-century work generally recognised as the first text in Japanese literature devoted to criticism of works in the monogatari genre), where objections to Genji's prolific sexual relationships were made.

Kaoru's main characteristic is his natural fragrance and distinct scent. His name, Kaoru is short for Kaoru Chujo which means 'the Fragrant Captain'. His fragrance is described as "unlike anything else in this world" and resembles the 'hundred-pace' incense often used for scenting clothes. Although his natural fragrance enhances other perfumes of nature – scented wood, plum blossoms, and purple trousers – his scent becomes a source of embarrassment for him as his distinct smell disables him from conducting love affairs in secrecy: "He could not hide. Let him step behind something in hopes of going unobserved... that scent would announce his presence." In chapter 51, ‘Ukifune’, Niou, Kaoru's friend and sexual rival, impersonates Kaoru to make love to Ukifune, to which he succeeds in doing so, although no one in the house, not even Ukifune notices Niou's lack of scent that always gave Kaoru's presence away.

Kaoru possessed qualities of an anti-hero, and has been recognised as the first in literature by scholar Seidensticker, who writes: "Murasaki Shikibu has a try, and many will say, succeeds, at a most extraordinary thing, the creation of the first anti-hero in the literature of the world." Other scholars acknowledge Kaoru as an anti-hero. His lack of human understanding towards others, and the inability to understand himself and has a tendency for ruining others. He is unaware that he indirectly caused Oigimi's death, having ordered Ben (a gentlewoman serving Oigimi and Naka no kimi) to secretly lead Niou into the Uji house, consequently leading to Niou's and Naka no kimi's night together. Through Oigimi's death, Kaoru reveals his willingness to compensate for a lost love through the substitute figure or memonto of Ukifune, her sister who has an identical physical presence, without consideration for her feelings. He does not know how damaging this becomes to Ukifune, who bears the brunt of his affections for Oigimi to cope with his mourning, failing to recognise his own shortcomings and inability to self-reflect. In Kaoru's perspective, Ukifune is described three times as a ‘katashiro’ for Oigimi, which can be translated to "doll" or "substitute", and regards her in a condescending manner: "A loveable sort of companion she might have been, someone not to be taken seriously or offered too excellent a place".

=== Rivalry with Niou ===
In chapter 51, 'Ukifune', Kaoru and Niou are depicted as rivals with contrasting characteristics, depicted most notably in their attitudes to love. Kaoru is reliable, calm and rational, whilst Niou is passionate but fickle. Kaoru lives in the past and future, whilst Niou lives in the present. Niou is the only character besides Genji's friend and rival, To no Chujo to be called 'adabito' (ada-person), someone who is thoroughly undependable in love that his unreliability is his chief feature. Meanwhile, Kaoru is frequently referred to as a 'mamebito' (mame-person), meaning sincere and serious, the exact antonym of 'ada'.

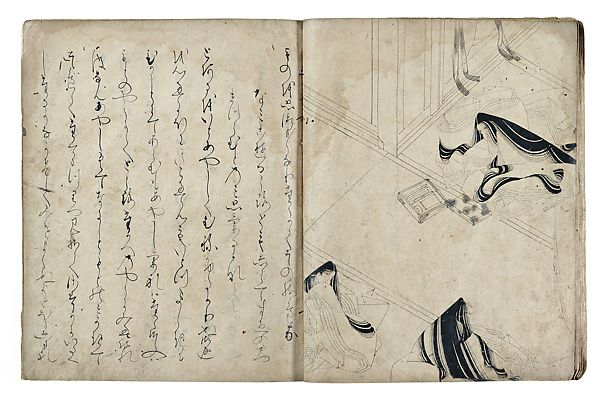
Ukifune reads a letter from Kaoru reproaching her for being unfaithful to him with Prince Niou. Finding herself entangled in a love triangle, Ukifune nervously faces her inkstone and brush as she considers how to reply.

Kaoru's faithfulness does not imply his loyalty to one woman or uninterest in secret affairs, rather that he takes the duties of love seriously: "...in his own mind there were things he perceived about himself that caused him maturely to avoid carefree and self-indulgent love affairs even when he was deeply moved". Kaoru's immense concern for his reputation and public image causes him to conduct his love affairs in a socially acceptable manner. Scholars have perceived this strict propriety and self-control as Kaoru's attempt to atone for the affair of his mother and true father, Kashiwagi: "...he did not single out any ladies for special attentions and he kept his affairs quiet". Kaoru converts his secret affairs into less risky, more stable ones, he does not marry any of the women he is involved with, offering them positions as attendants in his mother's house, where they would be likely to see him frequently. In contrast, Niou is so fond of women, that he has little care for established customs. His wife, Naka no kimi thinks: "Whenever it occurs to him to have a brief affair with one of the women in service, he will even go visiting her in her home, where he ought not to be". Niou would improperly treat a woman of the attendant level as a true love, instead of as a 'meshiudo', a mistress.

The contrast in character and rivalry between Kaoru and Niou become prominent between the chapters 49 'Yadorigi' and 52 'Kagero' through their competition over Ukifune. Ultimately, the rivalry becomes more important to them than the women they fight over, as each strives to bring the other bitterness and disappointment.

== Literary context ==
The Tale of Genji was written by Murasaki Shikibu during the Heian period of Japan. Because it was written to entertain Japanese court women of the eleventh century, the language, court Japanese of the Heian period, was inflected and had complex grammar. The use of proper names was considered rude in Heian court society, so none of the characters in the work are named. Instead, the narrator refers to men by their rank or station in life, and to women by the colour of their clothing, or by the words used at a meeting, or by the rank of a prominent male relative. Due to this, translators like A. Waley and Tyler would include a 'translator's note' or character list at the start of every chapter to ensure the readers could differentiate between people.

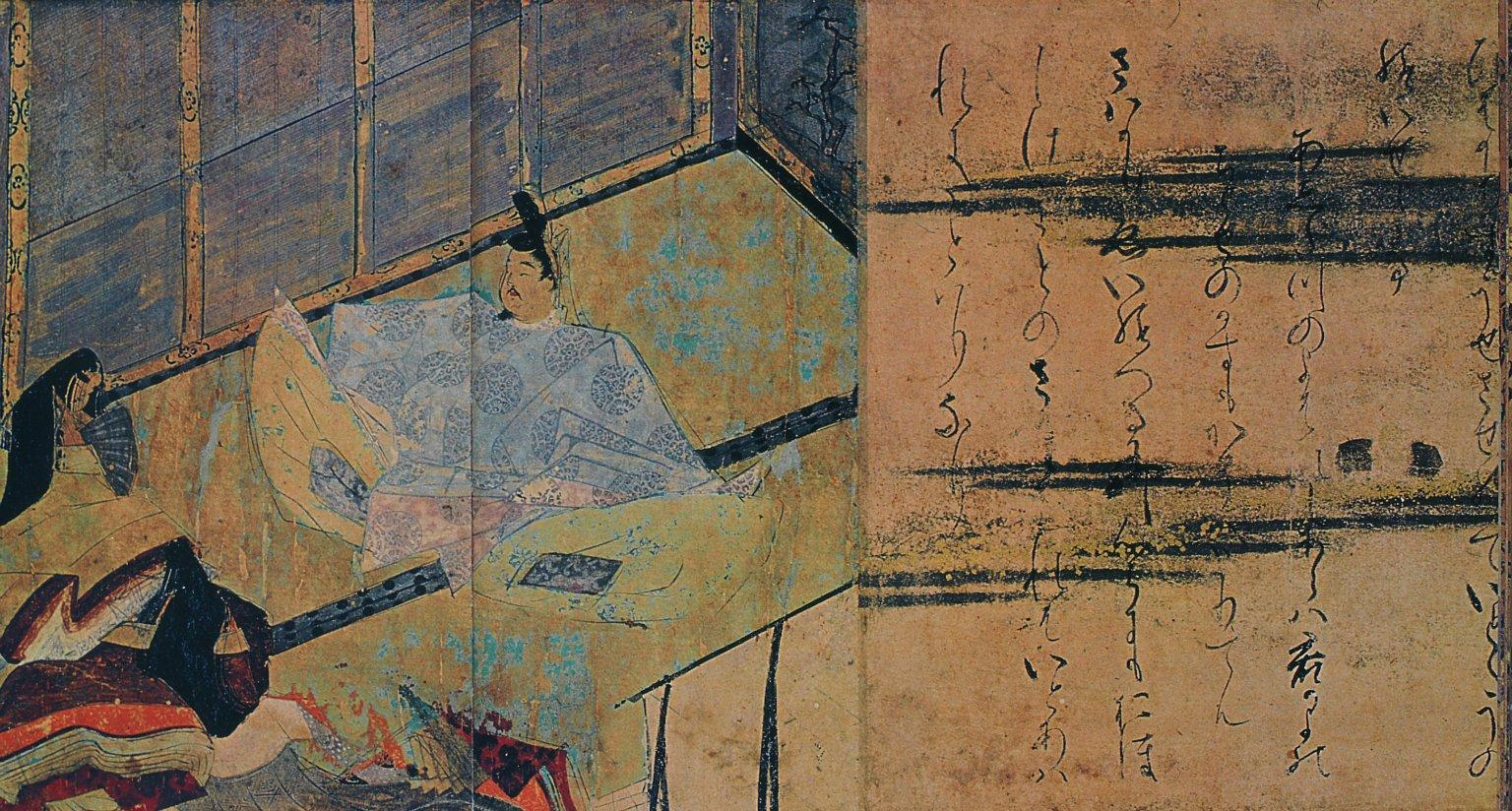
Detail from Murasaki Shikibu Diary Emaki; 13th century painting showing Murasaki Shikibu being ordered to compose a waka poem.

The courting culture in Heian period have also influenced the depictions of Romance in The Tale of Genji. A man's options in the Heian period included marriage to several wives, a number of secret affairs, and both occasional and live-in lovers. The status of a particular attachment corresponded approximately to the position of the woman in society. A woman of influential family and very high rank like Oigimi, who is a princess, for example, would properly be the object of a formal marriage, in this case, to Kaoru.

Poetry was commonly used in conversations. In Heian court life, poems were used to reflect a certain situation and served to communicate metaphors and allusions. Shikibu's diary recounts poetry she and others wrote to each other. One example of poetry used in conversation was with the Lord Prime Minister. He urges her to write a poem about a prior situation, which she does, and he replies by writing a poem as well. Poetry is also used abundantly in The Tale of Genji. In the first part of the Second Month, Niou, Kaoru, and other court officials gather at the Palace to compose poems in Chinese to be read to the emperor in the following morning.

The primary characteristic of Kaoru, his fragrant scent, was influenced by Kodo, the 'Way of Fragrance'. As Murasaki was a court lady herself, the prominence of scent at court life may have influenced his character construction, as well as the role of incense in The Tale of Genji.

== Analysis ==
Kaoru's character is perceived as one of the first anti-heroes of literature, like Odysseus from The Odyssey, due to his character construction. Kaoru is referred to as an anti-hero by scholars, replacing the heroic stature of the high nobility focused on in prior acts. This is due to Kaoru being one of the fallen princes, the other being Niou.

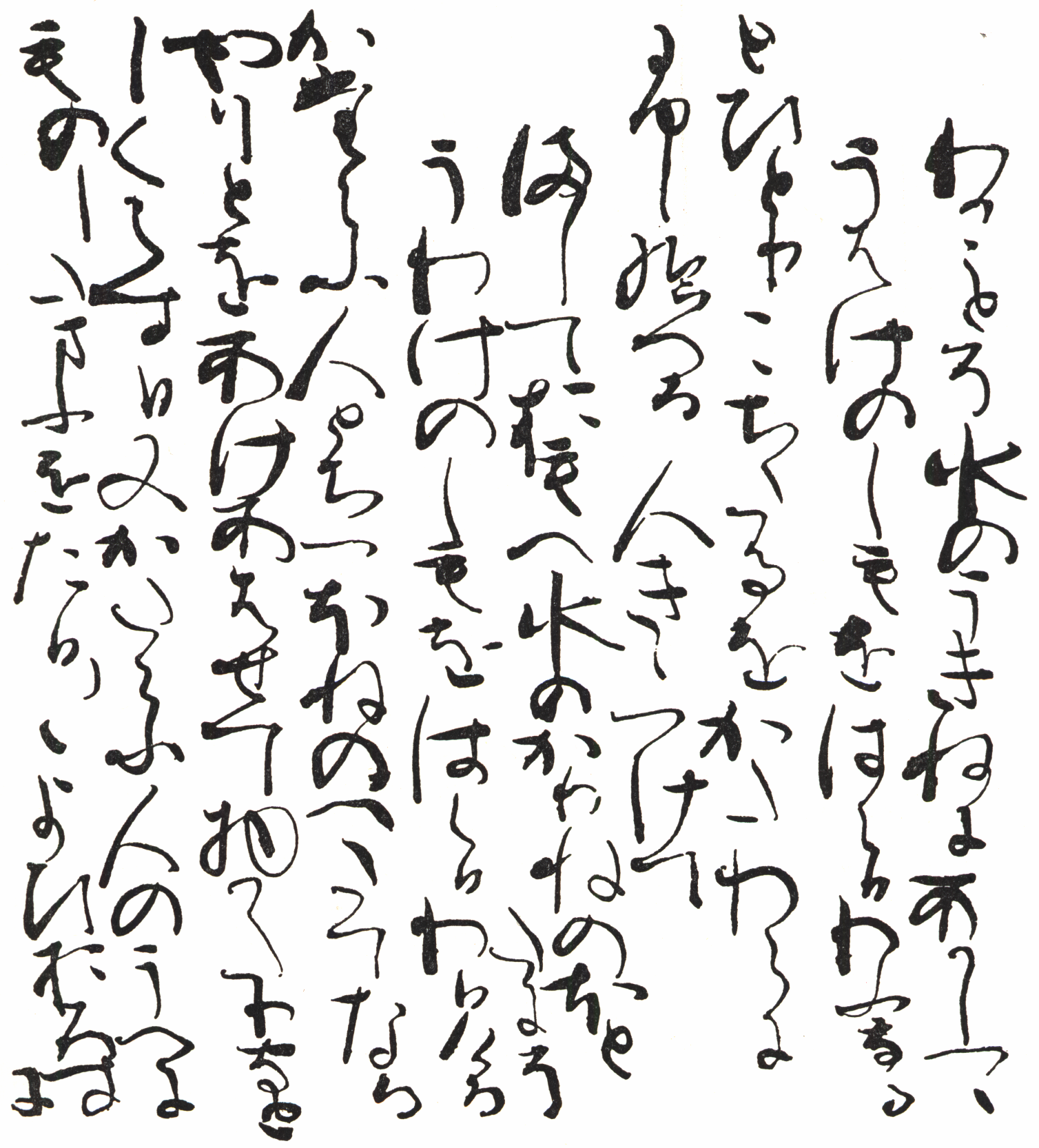
A page of the Sarashina Nikki.

Among scholars, Kaoru is believed to have homoerotic inclinations due to a hysterical desire to avoid the sins of both his biological and imagined fathers, particularly, the passionate affairs of his parents being the cause of his confused sense of identity. It is argued that the whole of The Tale of Genji hints at a subtle homoerotic writing, spanning from Genji's to Kaoru's chapters. Scholar Tatsumi Kanda especially argues that Kaoru and Niou are in a homoerotic relationship (danshoku kankei) with each other, despite the relationship not necessarily being carnal. Kaoru's homoeroticism stems primarily from image fixation through family resemblance, particularly Oigimi's resemblance to her father, Hachinomiya who he venerated as a father figure. Despite his yearning for a father figure, which he finds in Oigimi, he engages in sexual relationship with her, thus scholars believing this to be hints of Kaoru's homoeroticism. Erotic surrogacy or substitution is also evident in Kaoru's infatuation with Ukifune after Oigimi dies, as she resembled her sister greatly.

Due to stark contrast in styles between the Uji chapters and the rest of the novel, there is a debate among scholars about the authorship of Murasaki's work. The difference in styles between protagonists, Genji and Kaoru thus invite different interpretations and opinions regarding Kaoru's character, especially other female authors of the Heian era. Their heroes resembled Kaoru more than Genji, for example the author of the Sarashina Nikki (Sarashina diary), seeing him as her ideal. Another example of female Heian authors' favouritism towards Kaoru is the Mumyozoshi's (c.a. 1200) author, writing, "There are many things about him [Genji] that one might wish otherwise" contrasting her statement about Kaoru, "There is nothing about him that one would wish to be different."

Although Heian authors favoured Kaoru, modern scholars have expressed frustration towards the lack of communication between characters in the Uji chapters, particularly between Kaoru and his lovers, Oigimi and Ukifune. In the study of Ukifune, Amanda Stinchecum wrote: "the uniformity of diction reveals disjunctions in thought, misunderstandings... even in dialogue, a lack of receptiveness..." this may have been due to Kaoru's hesitancy and unsure approach to his romantic relationships.
