= Matsuranomiya monogatari =

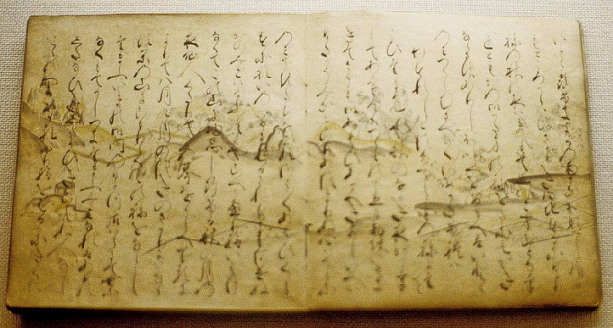
Matsuranomiya monogatari

The Matsuranomiya monogatari (松浦宮物語, Matsuranomiya Monogatari; "The Tale of the Matsura Palace") is an unfinished monogatari written by Fujiwara no Teika, the famous waka poet of the Kamakura period. It was written at the end of the 12th century or the very beginning of the 13th century.

== Authorship and date ==
The majority of scholars accept Fujiwara no Teika as the author of the work. It is the only extant work of fiction by Teika, although there were probably others at one time. The Mumyōzōshi (1200 or 1201) attributes the work to him.

It was probably written between 1189 and 1201. This date is established by collating the Mumyōzōshi passage (which calls him shōshō or "lesser captain") with what is known about Teika from external sources (he was held the office of shōshō from 1189 to 1202).

== Influences ==
The work is thematically similar to the Utsubo monogatari, whose hero and use of music as a central theme are both mirrored. The Mumyōzōshi claimed that the work's plot brought Utsubo to mind. The work contains poems that, particularly in the first book, show the influence of the Man'yōshū (as is noted in the Mumyōzōshi). Teika may have lifted the idea of setting a significant part of the tale in China from the Hamamatsu Chūnagon Monogatari.

Teika noticeably avoids allusion to the Genji monogatari. The work is set in the remote past (the period of Fujiwara-kyō, 692–710), long before the era of Genji. It is unclear why he chose to avoid the influence of Genji: it may be that his masculinity made him averse to the "delicacy" of Murasaki Shikibu, or that he pined for the days when the Japanese nobility were proficient in military arts as well as literature.

It has also been suggested that the descriptions of warfare may have been influenced by either Teika's experiences of the Genpei War or his readings of descriptions of the An Lushan Rebellion.

== Content ==
The protagonist, Ben no Shōshō (弁少将) is a Chinese poetry prodigy even as a seven-year-old and later becomes highly proficient with musical instruments. He falls in love with Princess Kannabi (神奈備皇女, Kannabi-no-miko), but she does not return his affections. He is dispatched as part of one of the embassies to China. At the farewell banquet, Princess Kannabi writes him a poem saying that her heart will go with him on his journey. He departs for China from the port of Matsura in Kyūshū, and his mother waits for him at Matsura and builds a palace there, giving the work its title.

After docking in Ningbo, the embassy proceed to the capital, and Shōshō's mastery of the arts makes a positive impression on the emperor. Shōshō is entertained, by the arrangement of the emperor, by beautiful dancing girls, but he is untempted and spends his nights alone, his restraint further impressing the emperor. Shōshō takes up the study of the qin with an elderly master, who encourages him to study with Princess Hua-yang (華陽公主, Kayō-no-miko), a player even more skilled than himself. Upon finding Princess Hua-yang in her mountain retreat, he is immediately smitten with her, thinking the dancing girls like clay-dolls and even Princess Kannabi a mere "country wench". She teaches him to play a secret piece, and two commemorate the occasion with an exchange of poems in Chinese and Japanese.

She reveals that she learned to play the qin from an immortal descended from heaven. When next they meet, she teaches him the rest of the secret pieces, but confesses that she will pass away soon. However, she tells him that if, after returning to Japan, he performs observances before the Kannon statue at the Hatsuse Temple (長谷寺 or 初瀬寺, Hase-dera or Hatsuse-dera), they can be reunited. The princess dies soon after, and the emperor dies soon after that. There is a succession dispute between the child crown prince and the late emperor's brother Prince Yen. The ensuing war is a disaster, with desertions from the loyalist forces handing the advantage to the rebel Prince Yen.

The empress, in desperation, turns to Shōshō, who is inexperienced in warfare but has no choice but to accept the empress's request. Shōshō's force of fifty or sixty men faces a rebel army thirty thousand strong. He prays to the buddhas and gods of Japan, and a supernatural miracle grants the Japanese victory in the battle. Following the victory and the restoration of piece, the empress grants Shōshō her leave to return to Japan, even though she wishes she could hand the affairs of state over to him, and the two have a brief love affair.

An abbreviated passage briefly describes the journey home, Shōshō's reunion with his mother at Matsura. She rushes to the Hatsuse Temple and performs the ritual ordered by Princess Hua-yang, who is reborn. Their love is renewed, and while Shōshō has not forgotten the empress, he is no longer interested in Princess Kannabi, who is confused by his lack of affection for her. The empress, however, reappears, arousing the jealousy of Hua-yang. The conflict between the three women in Shōshō's life is not resolved, as Teika chose to end the story at this point.

== Sources ==
- Keene, Donald (1999) [1993]. A History of Japanese Literature, Vol. 1: Seeds in the Heart – Japanese Literature from Earliest Times to the Late Sixteenth Century. New York, NY: Columbia University Press. ISBN 978-0-231-11441-7.

=== Additional source ===
- Hagitani, Boku (1970). Matsuranomiya Monogatari (in Japanese). Tokyo: Kadokawa Shoten.
