= Head honcho =

Wiktionary redirect

== See also ==
- honcho (disambiguation)
