= Torikaebaya Monogatari =

Japanese tale from the late Heian period

- First page of Torikaebaya Monogatari, in an Edo period book.
- Author: unknown
- Original title: とりかへばや物語
- Language: Japanese
- Genre: Monogatari
- Publisher: various
- Publication date: late Heian period
- Publication place: Japan

Torikaebaya Monogatari (とりかへばや物語; literally "If only I could exchange (them)! story"), translated into English as The Changelings, is a Japanese tale from the late Heian period (794 to 1185) by an unknown author, or possibly more than one author. It is four volumes in length.

It is the tale of two siblings whose mannerisms are those of the opposite sex, and their relationships in the Emperor's court. It has been adapted as a novel, two different manga series, and a Takarazuka Revue play. It was translated into English in 1983. The reception of the tale over time has depended on how the society sees sex and gender issues, with one reading of it being as a ribald erotic comedy, while another reading is as a serious attempt to discuss sex and gender issues through a Heian Buddhist understanding.

== Story ==
The story tells of a Minister of the Left, a high-ranking courtier, who has two similar-looking children by different mothers, but whose mannerisms are those of the opposite sex. The title, Torikaebaya, literally means, "If only I could exchange them!", a cry by the father. The Minister of the Left plans to have them join religious orders, but news of the "son's" talents reaches the court. The children undergo the coming-of-age ceremonies for the opposite sex, and the Minister of the Left presents his daughter as a man to the court and his son as a woman.

The man living as a woman, now known as Naishi no Kami 'Head of the Ceremonies Committee' in the Kōkyū (the Imperial family's residence within the palace), becomes the sheltered princess' confidant. The sister, living as a man, becomes a Chūnagon (mid-ranking courtier). The siblings are worried that they will be exposed, and so Naishi no Kami is even shyer than most ladies of the court, and the Chūnagon more aloof than is seemly.

Despite this, the Chūnagon has platonic affairs with the elder Yoshino princess and the Lady of the Reikeiden (麗景殿). The Naishi no Kami is pursued by men — the Crown Prince falls in love with the Naishi no Kami based on her reputation and pursues her relentlessly. The Chūnagon's best friend, Saishō Chūjō, attempts to seduce Naishi no Kami for a period of two nights and a day.

The daughter, as the Chūnagon, marries a woman, Shi no Kimi 'Fourth Daughter'. Saishō attempts to educate the Chūnagon's wife about what couples do beyond holding hands and sleeping together all night.

The Naishi no Kami avoids the pursuit of the Crown Prince. Saishō has an affair with Shi no Kimi, and then turns his attention to the Chūnagon, discovering in a grappling match the Chūnagon's true sex. He then begins courting the Chūnagon in the usual manner, insisting that he return to being a woman. The Chūnagon becomes pregnant, and hides himself away from the court. The Naishi no Kami has sex with the princess, who becomes pregnant. The Naishi no Kami dresses as a man to search for the Chūnagon; after the Chūnagon gives birth, the siblings swap places.

The tengu who cursed the siblings in their previous lives to not be content with the sex they were born with has since become a Buddhist. Willig's translation mistakenly says that it's the siblings' father who has turned to the path. Because of the tengu's conversion, as the siblings resolve to swap roles and dress in the clothes of their physical sex, they become content. The former Naishi no Kami marries the sheltered princess, the elder Yoshino princess, and 'remains' married to Shi no Kimi. He attains the rank of Minister of the Left.

The Crown Prince, now Emperor, has sex with the former Chūnagon, and is dismayed to find she is not a virgin, but marries her anyway. Saishō never learns what became of the former Chūnagon. The princess barely notices the change in her female companion. The siblings live happily ever after and have many children with their new spouses.

== Main characters ==
A Note on Heian names: The characters do not possess the equivalent of birth names. Instead they are assigned sobriquets from the particular court positions they or their fathers occupy, or from the name of their residence. See also Japanese name.

- The Minister of the Left: Father of Himegimi and Wakagimi, uncle of Shi no Kimi.
- Himegimi: Daughter of the Minister of the Left, known for most of the story as the Chūnagon; later, she marries the Emperor and becomes Empress.
- Wakagimi: Son of the Minister of the Left, known for most of the story as the Naishi no Kami (translated as "Lady in Waiting"); later, he succeeds his father as Minister of the Left.
- Shi no Kimi / Yon no Kimi ("Fourth Daughter"): Cousin and wife to the Chūnagon, she is sexually innocent until her affair with Saishō. She bears him two children, and 'remains' married to the new Minister of the Left, Wakagimi. Her character is quite different in the earlier version of the Torikaebaya. The Mumyōzōshi berates her character in the later version for her unfaithfulness to her husband. She seems to suspect that her husband is not the same person after the siblings swap.
- Saishō Chūjō: Two years older than the Chūnagon, he is the Chūnagon's best friend. His unhappy longing for Naishi no Kami leads him to seek solace in his friend, similar to Genji's relationships with the siblings Utsusemi, who is cold, and her younger brother, Kogimi, whom Genji has a chigo relationship with.
- Yoshino Prince: Father of the two half-Chinese Yoshino princesses. He predicts that the Chūnagon will go on to achieve "great things" and urges her not to join religious orders.
- Elder Yoshino Princess: The Chūnagon has an affair with her, and she later marries the new Minister of the Left. The Yoshino princesses are considered curiosities at court due to their ethnicity. As such, the Chūnagon feels an affinity for them, given his own situation.
- Younger Yoshino Princess: Marries Saishō at the close of the story.
- Crown Prince/Emperor: His longing for the Chūnagon's sister leads Wakagimi to be presented at court as the Naishi no Kami. He pursues the Naishi no Kami, and assaults, then marries, the former Chūnagon.
- Princess / Crown Princess: A sheltered princess whom the Naishi no Kami becomes Lady-in-Waiting to. She conceives a child with Naishi no Kami, and marries the new Minister of the Left, Wakagimi, at the close of the tale.
- Lady of the Reikeiden: A lady whom the Chūnagon has an affair with. After the Chūnagon becomes pregnant, he turns to the Lady of the Reikeiden for solace. According to Kawai, his relationship with the Chūnagon parallels Hikaru Genji's relationship with Hanachirusato, the Lady of the Orange Blossoms, as both characters offer the heroes comfort when they are depressed. Kawai argues that the emotions and pathos are heightened in Torikaebaya because the relationship is between two women.

== Authorship ==
Rohlich believes this scene from The Tale of Genji, where Genji discusses women with his friends, is similar to a scene present in the older version of Torikaebaya.

It is unknown whether Torikaebaya Monogatari was written by a man or a woman, but it has been theorised that there were two versions of the tale, the first known as Torikaebaya or Kō Torikaebaya, thought to have been written by a man, and the latter, known as Ima Torikaebaya, written by a woman. Mumyōzōshi, written by a female author between 1200 and 1202, which critiques various Heian tales, says there are two versions of the tale. In her opinion, the Ima Torikaebaya is the far superior of the two works. The earlier version of the tale has "disagreeable" scenes, including a scene discussing the Chūnagon's menstruation, and a scene where the former Chūnagon gives birth while still partially dressed as a man, which scandalised the author of the Mumyōzōshi. Another scene not present in the later version is a scene where the male characters discuss monogatari on a "day of abstinence", which is considered similar to scenes from The Tale of Genji, but not as good by the author of the Mumyōzōshi, as it is an imitation. It is thought that the current version of the Torikaebaya is somewhere between the older and newer versions of the tale known by the author of Mumyōzōshi.

Meiji scholars thought that the tale was too degenerate to have possibly been written by a woman, but it has been pointed out that other tales "with a similar focus on the physical" are known to have been written by women. In the case of the earlier version of the tale, this may have been a case of a man imitating the writing conventions of female authors. Rosette F. Willig, who translated it into English, considers the version she used, Ima Torikaebaya, to have been written between 1100–70, and suggested that some elements of the tale may be autobiographical. There are over eighty extant manuscripts of Torikaebaya Monogatari.

The setting of Torikaebaya is at some "indefinite point" in the distant past of the Heian era — the Crown Princess's status adds to the "air of antiquity" in the work, as that particular issue of succession did not present itself from the eighth century to the seventeenth century. The tale takes place in Uji, Kyoto and Yoshino. Uji is a few hours walk to the south of Kyoto, but Yoshino is a full day's journey south of Kyoto. Saisho regularly travels between Kyoto and Uji in the first half of the story, but "knows nothing" of events in Yoshino.

== Reception ==
The reception of the tale has been mixed, depending on the society's view of sex and gender. The Mumyozoshi censures only Shi no Kimi, who should have been satisfied with her faithful and attentive (if female) husband. Meiji era critics were particularly repulsed by the tale, calling it part of the decline of the aristocracy, and due to this reputation, it received little study even as recently as 1959.

In the late 1960s and early 1970s, Morioka Tsuneo, Michihiro Suzuki (鈴木弘道, Suzuki Michihiro), and Sen'ichi Hisamatsu studied the tale's ethical dimensions, seeking to rehabilitate the work's reputation. More recently LGBT critics have prized the tale for its portrayal of lesbianism, centuries before the Class S genre, although Gregory Pflugfelder does not see the tale as being "lesbian", as he finds it problematic to apply modern labels to older texts.

Torikaebaya has been described as a "sensationalist", "sprightly" and entertaining tale, but to Willig and Gatten, it is questionable as to whether the tale is intended as a farce, as during the period such issues were considered very grave and the results of bad karma in a former life.

Gatten believes the tale to begin farcically, but says the characters grow out of their initial stereotypes to gain enough "psychological depth" to solve their difficulties, and the tale becomes a "realistic treatment of Heian sexual roles". Rohlich says that Torikaebaya is "clearly not meant to be comic", despite the plot deriving largely from "ironic misunderstandings" about the switch, "all else" in the tale, such as the relationships and the pursuits are "familiar stock-in-trade" from the monogatari genre. The Princeton Companion to Classical Japanese Literature says that Torikaebaya has several "delightful comic touches", such as the Chūnagon being thoroughly surprised when her wife Shi no Kimi becomes pregnant. Torikaebaya is also detailed in terms of its references to the effects of the weather, and the Chūnagon's morning sickness. Hayao Kawai considers the "alchemy" of the tale to be the "double existence" of the siblings, which drives the plot from beginning to end. Rohlich loses interest in the latter half of the tale after the siblings switch back.

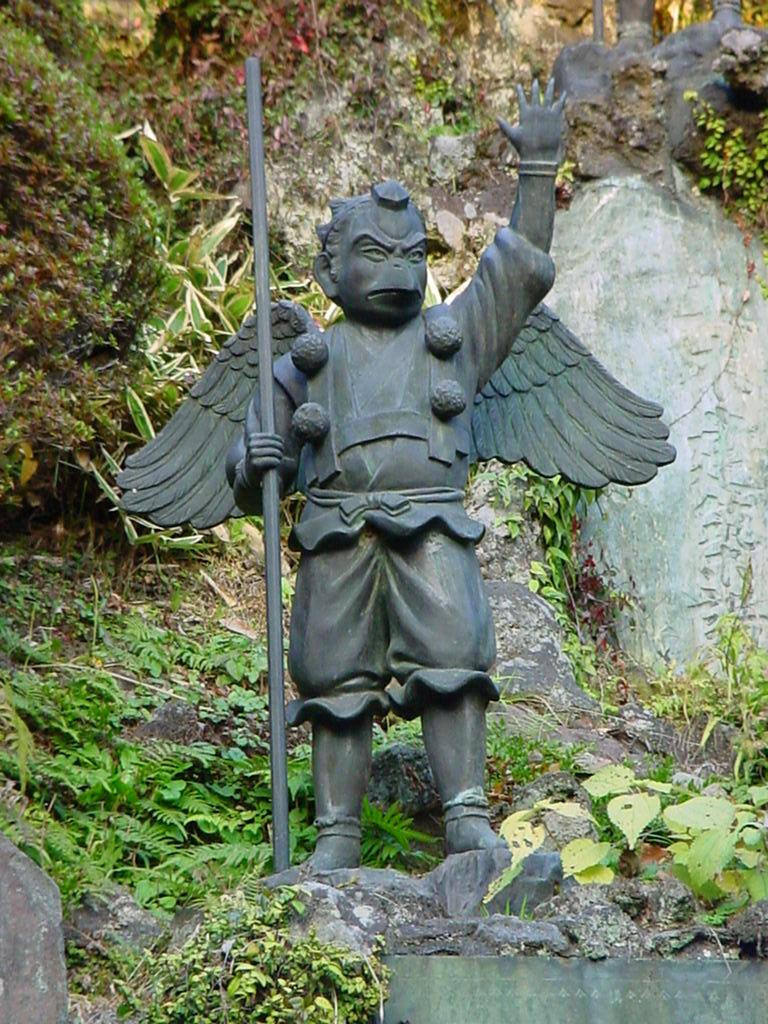
A Kamakura period tengu statue. At the time Torikaebaya was written, tengu were considered evil and the enemies of Buddhism.

The Companion considers Torikaebaya to deal with issues of sex, sexuality and gender "more profoundly" than William Shakespeare or Ben Jonson. The princess's acceptance of the male Naishi no Kami as a female and a lover has been variously described as either that she is very sheltered, or that sexual relationships were common between court ladies at the time. Although the tale has been regarded as immoral, Gregory Pflugfelder says that ultimately, the tale conforms to traditional roles. The father of the children initially considers their condition to be preordained as "retribution" for something they did in their past lives, as part of a Buddhist worldview. Pflugfelder says that in the original text, the siblings' condition is not labelled definitively — where Willig adds "confusion of sexual identity", the original text says merely "such a condition". The tengu were considered at the time to be evil, and the enemies of Buddhism.

Anthony J. Bryant describes the encounters between Saishō and the Chūnagon, and the Emperor and the former Chūnagon, as rape. Margaret Childs believes that in love relationships in ancient Japan, showing vulnerability was highly prized and erotic, unlike in modern American society. She believes that for both sexes, nurturing was "a fundamental component of love". Thus, when a woman expresses distress at a man's overtures, she becomes erotic to him. Childs contrasts the ways the Naishi no Kami, Shi no Kimi, and the Chūnagon resist Saishō's overtures. The Naishi no Kami, the only successful resistant, resists by remaining cold and "impassive". Saishō becomes distressed, but the Naishi no Kami remains unmoved. Although it is important to the plot that the Naishi no Kami not be discovered as a man, Childs argues that the Naishi no Kami's tactic would have been considered plausible by the audience.

Shi no Kimi, on the other hand, is initially frightened of Saishō, and so he assaults her, and then afterwards comforts her. He coerces a servant into letting him into Shi no Kimi's quarters. Eventually, as Saishō shows his own vulnerability through their encounters, she becomes attracted to him. Saishō found Chūnagon attractive, both through 'his' own beauty and because Chūnagon reminds Saishō of Shi no Kimi and Naishi no Kami. One evening, as they were talking, and Chūnagon was "affectionately" listening to Saishō's love problems, Saishō embraces the Chūnagon and tells him that he loves him, thinking he is a man. The Chūnagon becomes angry with Saishō and tells him off, but Saishō only becomes more fervent in his embrace, and thus discovers the Chūnagon is a woman. The Chūnagon then loses his courage−though he remains cold, he no longer actively resists him.

The ending has been called "surprisingly dark" by The Princeton Companion to Classical Japanese Literature, although it does not expand on this line of thought. Gatten describes the ending as being happy, and The Companion notes that the former Chūnagon achieves great things as Empress, as the Yoshino Prince predicted. The many children of the siblings at the tale's close, noted in the Mumyōzōshi, are seen as a sign that all is as it should be.

Some of the Chūnagon's affairs with women have been compared with those in The Tale of Genji, but with different results, as the Chūnagon is a woman. Torikaebaya Monogatari has many allusions to The Tale of Genji and Hamamatsu Chūnagon Monogatari, so much so that Gatten suggests its genre should be considered something like the honkadori in a waka, where an older poem is alluded to in a poem.

The character of the daughter is focused on in the story much more so than the character of the son, and her characterisation is considered an argument for a female author of Torikaebaya. Her public persona as the Chūnagon fits into the bishōnen (androgynous, beautiful hero) type of the monogatari, like Hikaru Genji or Yamato Takeru, rendering it especially ironic when Saishō, smarting after having been refused by the Naishi no Kami, wishes his beautiful friend the Chūnagon was a woman. Rohlich describes the Chūnagon as unique amongst monogatari figures, as not even the Lady who Loved Insects is as eccentric as the Chūnagon is. Rohlich considers the Chūnagon to be a modern successful career woman, whose talents are "frustrated" by an unexpected pregnancy.

Even after the Chūnagon returns to living as a woman, she uses her experience as a man to control her emotions, unlike other ladies of the court, who easily give into despair. After the Chūnagon gives birth, she is conflicted between escaping Saishō and her love for her baby, which Kawai characterizes as a conflict between "being herself" and "being a mother". She chooses independence. Kawai says that although her desire for independence is "normal" to a modern Western audience, in Heian Japan it was an "extremely difficult" decision. After she becomes Empress, she meets her child by chance at court and cannot tell him that she is his mother. Overcome with emotion, she tells him that she knows his mother and that his mother loves and misses him.

The characterization of the tale has been criticized by Shūichi Katō, who describes the characters' reactions as "hackneyed", and their characters as "not clearly defined". Katō describes the story as "unreal" and decries the "scenes of perverted sexuality" throughout the story.

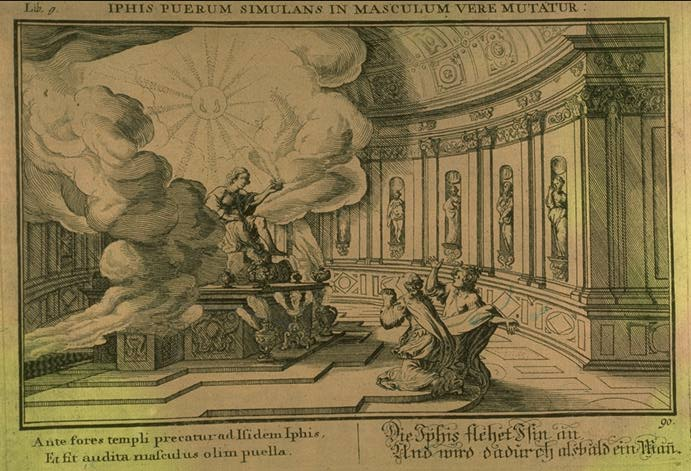
Iphis prays to the goddess Isis, and is turned into a man.

Hayao Kawai says that he is not aware of an equivalent tale to Torikaebaya in Japan or in other languages, but he can draw a parallel between the Chūnagon and a tale from Ovid's Metamorphoses of Iphis and Ianthe. Iphis (a unisex name) is raised as a boy from infancy, and when she comes of age, her father arranges a meeting with Ianthe. The two girls fall in love, but Iphis is torn because she believes she cannot marry Ianthe, since she is physically female. She prays to Isis and is transformed into a man. Iphis and Ianthe happily wed. Kawai considers Iphis's suffering to be similar to that of the Chūnagon, but that the Chūnagon becomes a true woman without the aid of a miracle. Kawai considers the Minister of the Left's dream, which reveals the tengu's curse to be a moment of harmony between the "exterior reality and the interior reality".

Kawai argues that many different kinds of love relationships are depicted in Torikaebaya, including those between siblings, parents and children, and lovers. He considers it "remarkable" that jealousy does not figure in these tangled webs of love. Kawai describes the siblings as "bisexuals" — when the Chūnagon is cuckolded, although he feels sorry for herself, he can also feel "compassion" for his wife, who is in an unusual marriage. When the Chūnagon is hidden away in Uji by Saishō, Saishō returns to Shi no Kimi, and the former Chūnagon briefly feels jealous, but uses her experience as a man to attain some emotional distance. She resolves to escape Saishō after having her child, and "pretends to love him passionately". The Emperor, although dismayed that the former Chūnagon (or, as he thinks, the Naishi no Kami) is not a virgin, does not confront her about her previous lover. Kawai argues that this is another way in which jealousy is avoided in the tale. Saishō does not understand what happened to the former Chūnagon, and he quizzes his new wife, the younger Yoshino Princess, about the matter fruitlessly. To preserve his home’s harmony, he gives up trying to locate the former Chūnagon. To Kawai, this "reflects his lack of jealousy".

For Kawai, a modern audience may disrespect Saishō and the Emperor for not seeking out the truth above all else in these matters, but Kawai thinks that the author believes that jealousy is a "dissonance" in love, and a slight "dissonance" is preferable, as it heightens awareness of the "beauty" of the work. In his view, Saishō and the Emperor putting aside their jealousy prevents the work from having too much "dissonance". Kawai says that by changing one's point of view, for example, becoming like the opposite sex as the siblings do, "useless conflicts" can be sidestepped. He regards "bisexuality" as a counter to "violent feelings of jealousy", as it enriches a relationship and leaves jealousy no foothold.

Kawai regards the author's intent in Torikaebaya as aesthetic rather than as writing "a sentimental story spiced with erotic scenes". Kawai suggests that the author of Torikaebaya sought to improve on the aesthetic of The Tale of Genji by imbuing their characters with "the virtues of each sex". By showing love scenes between two men or two women, albeit with one partner playing the role of the opposite sex, Kawai believes the author attempted to show that "a man is lovelier when his feminine side is revealed" and also that "a woman becomes more beautiful when she shows her masculine side".

When the former Chūnagon repairs to Uji to give birth at the suggestion of Saisho, she is overcome by depression. When she reaches Kohata, where she might escape notice, she decides "to reveal she is female". She takes out her flute, which she had owned since childhood, and begins playing it for the last time. She was very sad, and she played "splendidly, the sound was indescribable". This scene is an allusion to Genji, where two lovers escape to Uji. In that scene, young men play the flute, which is traditionally a male instrument. Kawai finds the image of a young man becoming a woman to be a 'unique moment of transition'.

Kawai describes Torikaebaya as being similar to Honoré de Balzac's Séraphîta, about an angelic androgyne who is loved by both a man and a woman, who each believe the androgyne to be the opposite sex to themselves. For Kawai, like in Séraphîta, the "union" of masculinity and femininity in the siblings is "something divine", although it is not as clear in Torikaebaya as it is in Séraphîta. Pflugfelder describes the siblings as "quasi-divine", drawing a parallel with the Dragon King’s daughter from the Lotus Sutra, who by her devotion transforms into a man and begins to teach Buddhism. Kawai notes that the siblings cannot be "properly united as they are not lovers or spouses".

Pflugfelder regards the siblings' switches as an example of gender performativity, he notes that each of the siblings will have to re-learn courtly manners in their birth gender, but that their performances as the opposite gender were "convincing", and suggests that in Japanese, gender roles are spoken of with modifiers that make gender seem "mutable" or "superficial".

The heroine of Ariake no Wakare is similar to Himegimi, and like Himegimi, she has romantic relationships with other women.

Although it may seem strange that the siblings pass, Nishimura points out the male-role actors of the Takarazuka Revue. He also notes that Heian-era clothing had many layers, which Cavanaugh says in the tale is revealed to both "identify gender and mask sex". Torikaebaya has been noted as placing great importance on clothes in the narrative compared to other Heian monogatari. When the siblings dress in the garments of their sex, their gender changes to become that of their sex.

== Translations and adaptations ==
Yasunari Kawabata translated the tale into modern Japanese "shortly after the conclusion of the Pacific War". This and subsequent translations led to the tale being rehabilitated from its Meiji-era reputation for immorality by Tsuneo Morioka, Hiromichi Suzuki and Sen'ichi Hisamatsu in the late 1960s and early 1970s.

Torikaebaya Monogatari was translated into English by Rosette F. Willig in 1983 as The Changelings. She had previously translated the tale for her doctoral dissertation. Her translation is based on an annotated edition of the tale by Hiromichi Suzuki, published in 1973 by Kasama Shoin as Torikaebaya Monogatari no Kenkyu. The choice of the translated title has been criticised as seeming to imply that the tale is magical, but Horton has referred to the translated title as "inspired". Willig does not discuss why she chose "The Changelings" as being the title of the tale. "Chūnagon" is always referred to as male in the translation, and the "Naishi no Kami" is female, regardless of whether the brother or sister is in the role. Thus, before the siblings switch, Willig's translation refers to the character by their assumed sex, leading to such structures as the Chūnagon feeling confined by "his pregnant condition". One reviewer has described this as "awkward", but relates that pronouns were genderless and so they do not consider this to be the original author's fault. At times, the translation has been said to be too colloquial, such as the Emperor crying "Oh, god!" when he discovers his reticent lady is not a virgin. There are many errors in the bibliography for the translation.

The introduction to the story makes many generalisations about Japanese literature, some of which are "misleading", especially the categorisation of Torikaebaya as a "giko monogatari" (imitation epic tale). Gatten has described the translation as "highly readable". Harper describes the prose of the translation as "wretched". Kelsey was disappointed that the foreword was so short and did not include discussion of androgyny in monogatari, but he suggests this may be due to pressure from the publisher to keep the book short. Despite the mixed reception of the translation, The Changelings has been recognised as an important contribution to the field of Heian monogatari study.

Torikaebaya Monogatari was translated by Michael Stein into German in 1994 as Die vertauschten Geschwister (lit. "The exchanged siblings"), and into French by Renée Garde in 2009 as Si on les échangeait. Le Genji travesti.

Saeko Himuro adapted the story as a two-volume novel The Change! (ざ·ちぇんじ!, Za Chenji!) published by Shueisha under the Cobalt Bunko imprint in 1983. This was adapted as a manga illustrated by Naomi Yamauchi, who worked with Himuro on other series, which was serialised by Hakusensha in Bessatsu Hana to Yume and Hana to Yume c. 1986 and collected in four tankōbon volumes released between 1987 and 88.

Toshie Kihara adapted the story into a one-volume manga called Torikaebaya Ibun (とりかえばや異聞) (ISBN 978-4-09-191221-3) which was published in February 1998. Torikaebaya Ibun was then adapted as a Takarazuka Revue play staged in 1987, starring Mine Saori (峰さを理), Minakaze Mai (南風まい), Hyuuga Kaoru (日向薫) and Shion Yuu (紫苑ゆう). It was restaged in February 2010 starring Kiriya Hiromu (霧矢大夢) and Aono Yuki (蒼乃夕妃).

Torikaebaya is mentioned briefly in Yukio Mishima's short story "Onnagata", available in English in the collection Death in Midsummer and Other Stories.

The characters of Maria-sama ga Miteru by Oyuki Konno perform a bowdlerised version of Torikaebaya in the 19th book of the series, published in 2004.

Chiho Saito's manga (2012–2018) is also inspired by the tale.

== See also ==
- Hamamatsu Chūnagon Monogatari
- Jinnō Shōtōki
- Kojiki
- Nihon Shoki
- The Pillow Book
- Sumiyoshi Monogatari
- The Tale of Genji
- Tsutsumi Chūnagon Monogatari
