= Ariake no Wakare =

Ariake no Wakare (有明の別れ) is a Japanese tsukuri-monogatari (romantic tale).

== Authorship and date ==
Very little is known about either the date of composition or author of Ariake no Wakare. Mumyōzōshi refers to the work as a "contemporary work" (今の世の物語, ima no yo no monogatari), implying it entered circulation not long before that work's compilation in 1200. This means it may date from either the end of the Heian period or the beginning of the Kamakura period.

== Reception ==
Ariake no Wakare was highly regarded by thirteenth-century court audiences.

== Works cited ==
- Keene, Donald (1999) [1993]. A History of Japanese Literature, Vol. 1: Seeds in the Heart – Japanese Literature from Earliest Times to the Late Sixteenth Century (paperback ed.). New York, NY: Columbia University Press. ISBN 978-0-231-11441-7.
