= Fūyō Wakashū =

13th century collection of Japanese poetry

Fūyō Wakashū (風葉和歌集) is a late 13th century collection of poetry from Japanese literature.

== Composition ==
The collection of poems was compiled in the year 1271. Although this is not completely certain, the author is believed to be Fujiwara no Tameie. According to the preface, the collection was commissioned by Emperor Go-Saga's consort, Ōmiya-in Kisshi.

== Contents ==
The text was originally twenty volumes in length. However, only the first eighteen are currently extant. It contains 1418 poems collected from 198 various tsukuri-monogatari. These are sorted into eleven categories, as detailed in the preface. Details of the author and context is given for each poem.

The contents of the now missing 19th and 20th volumes are unknown. It contained one of the eleven categories.

== Value ==
Many of the cited texts are either completely or partially no longer extant. Along with Mumyōzōshi, Fūyō Wakashū is highly valued as a resource for research on lost literature. Yoru no Nezame and Hamamatsu Chūnagon Monogatari are two examples of fragmentary texts in which it serves to supplement the missing parts.

== See also ==
- Mumyōzōshi, a literary criticism on Japanese stories and poetry, many of which are no longer extant
