= Honcho =

Honcho or Honchō can refer to:

== Places ==
- Itabashi-honchō Station, a metro station on the Toei Mita Line in Itabashi, Tokyo, Japan
- Yoshiwara-honchō Station, a train station on the Gakunan Railway Line in Fuji, Shizuoka Prefecture, Japan
- Hiyoshi-Honchō Station, a metro station in Japan
- Nihonbashi-Honcho, a neighborhood in the Nihonbashi area, Chūō ward, Tokyo, Japan

== Literature ==
- Honcho (comics), a fictional character in the Marvel Universe
- Honchō Monzui, a Japanese book of Chinese prose and poetry
- Honchō Seiki, a Japanese historical text
- Honchō Tsugan, a Japanese historical text from 1670

== Other ==
- Delta Sailplane Honcho, an American glider
- Jeep Honcho, an American vehicle
- Honcho (rapper), a Filipino rapper formerly known as Bosx1ne, a member of the Filipino hip-hop collective Ex Battalion
- Honcho - gay pornographic magazine published by Modernismo Publications from April 1978 to November 2009
