= Yoru no Nezame =

Japanese story of the Heian period

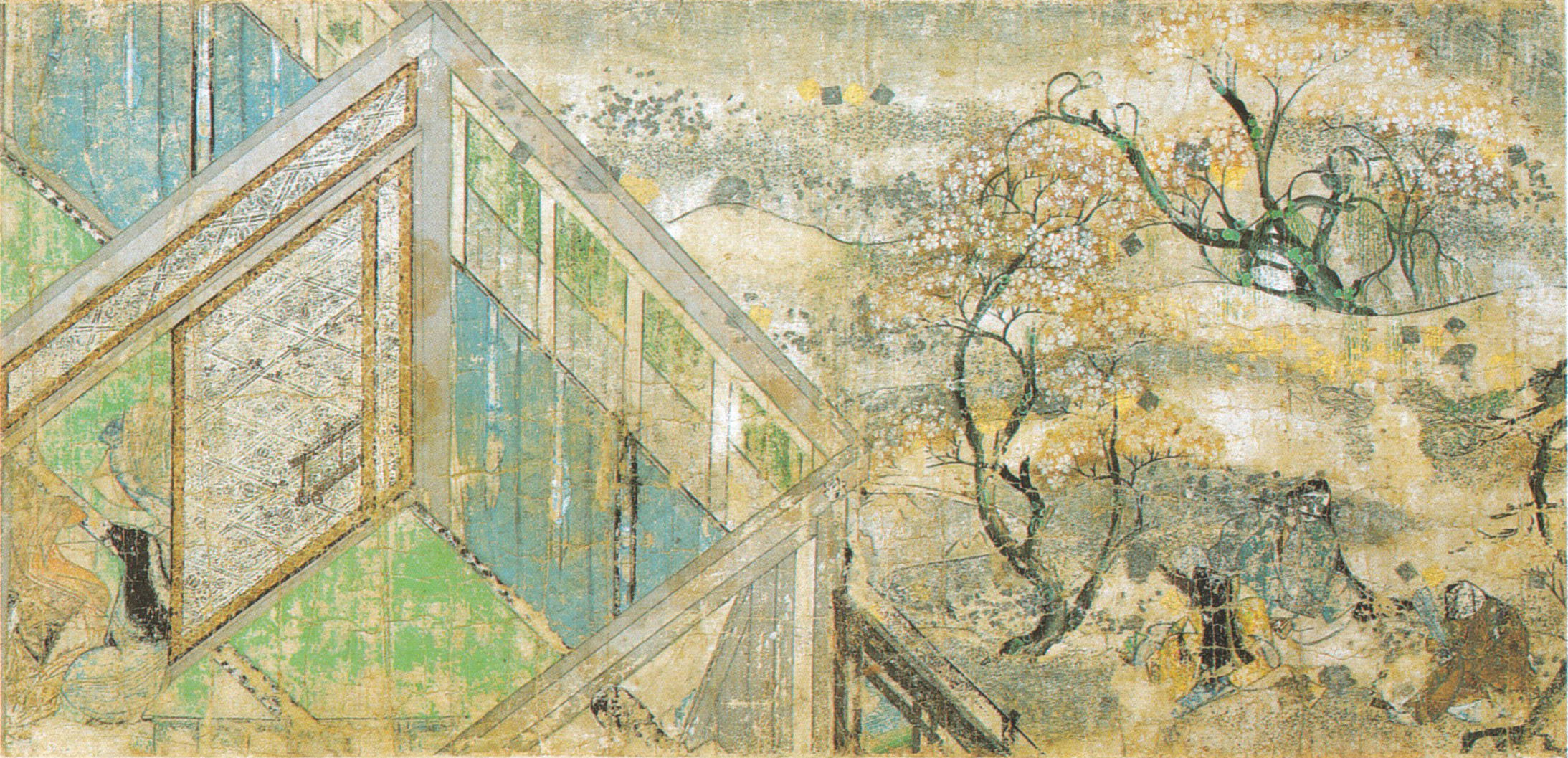
Scene from Yoru no Nezame.

Yoru no Nezame (夜の寝覚; lit. 'Wakefulness at Night'), Yowa no Nezame (夜半の寝覚; Japanese pronunciation: [joꜜ.wa no ne.(d)za.me], lit. 'Wakefulness at Midnight') or Nezame, is a c. 11th century Japanese story. It is one of the major representative Heian period texts. It is a courtly romance and belongs to the tsukuri monogatari genre.

== Composition ==
The text exists in both three- and five-volume editions. Which was the original title is unclear. Also unclear is the author. The Teika manuscript of Sarashina Nikki identifies the author as the daughter of Sugawara no Takasue (1008 – c. 1059); however, there are no other means to corroborate this. Linguistic analysis suggests a post-1086 composition. The text as a whole is judged to be a c. 11th-century work.

Major portions of the middle and end are no longer extant. Their contents may be inferred from other sources such as Mumyōzōshi, Shūi Hyakuban Utaawase, Fūyō Wakashū, Yoru no Nezame Monogatari, and Nezame Monogatari Emaki.

The text is a successor to Genji Monogatari, from which it shows much influence. However, while Genji is told from a male perspective, Yoru no Nezame is told from the perspective of a female protagonist.

== Contents ==
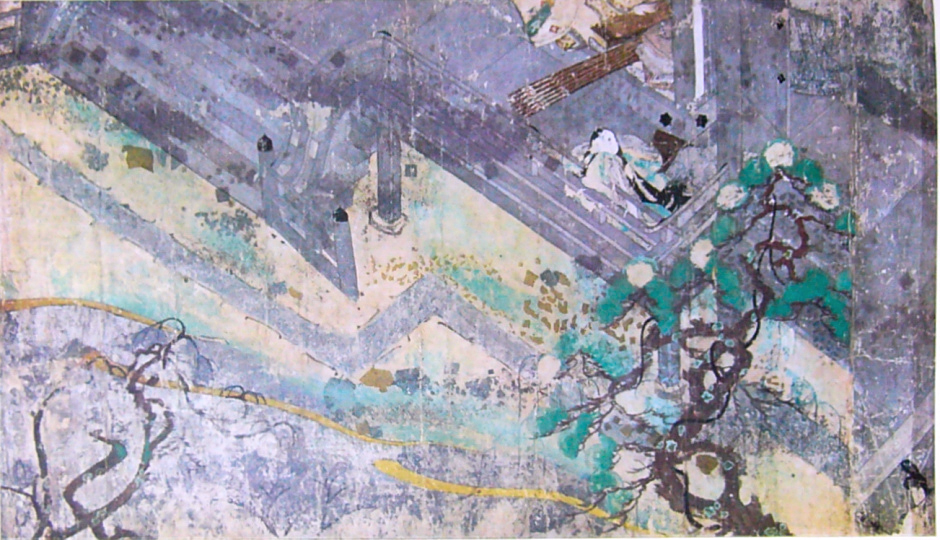
Scene from Yoru no Nezame.

Yoru no Nezame is a tragic love story revolving around the life of Nakanokimi, also known as Nezame no Ue, from which the story takes its title. Other characters include her elder sister Ōigimi and a Middle Counselor.

The story is divided into four sections:

1. The Middle Counselor is engaged with the elder sister Ōigimi. He mistakes the younger sister Nakanokimi for her and gets her pregnant. She gives birth to a daughter who goes to live with the father. When his now-wife learns the truth it destroys the family.
2. [No longer extant. Inferred from other sources.] Nakanokimi marries an older Left Captain. She gives birth to a son Masako, but he is really the son of the Middle Counselor. Ōigimi and the Left Captain pass away. The emperor has a thing for Nakanokimi and summons her to the palace; however, she escapes by sending someone else in her place.
3. While Nakanokimi is visiting the palace on business, the Emperor attempts to sneak into her quarters. Again Nakanokimi escapes. Following several palace plots, the Middle Counselor and Nakanokimi reconcile their past problems and have a son.
4. [No longer extant. Inferred from other sources.] A relationship develops between Masako and one of the emperor's daughters. The emperor punishes him for this. Nakanokimi dies and is reborn. She arranges for Masako's forgiveness and all is well for a time. She then leaves and passes away.

== Manuscripts ==
The text remains in seven extant manuscripts. Of them, the three-volume Maeda manuscript is judged the best.

There is also a later revised edition as well as an illustrated edition, both of which serve to supplement the missing content. The revised text, known as the Nakamura-bon, consists of a summary/adaptation of the work.

== Works cited ==
- Sakakura, Atsuyoshi (1964). Koten Bungaku Taikei 78: Yoru no Nezame (in Japanese). Iwanami Shoten. ISBN 4-00-060078-8.
- Kubota, Jun (2007). Iwanami Nihon Koten Bungaku Jiten [Iwanami Dictionary of Japanese Classical Literature] (in Japanese). Tokyo: Iwanami Shoten. ISBN 978-4-00-080310-6. OCLC 122941872.
- Nihon Koten Bungaku Daijiten: Kan'yakuban [A Comprehensive Dictionary of Classical Japanese Literature: Concise Edition]. Tōkyō: Iwanami Shoten. 1986. ISBN 4-00-080067-1. OCLC 22820487.
- Keene, Donald (1999) [1993]. A History of Japanese Literature, Vol. 1: Seeds in the Heart – Japanese Literature from Earliest Times to the Late Sixteenth Century (paperback ed.). New York, NY: Columbia University Press. ISBN 978-0-231-11441-7.
