= Uta monogatari =

Literary subgenre of the monogatari

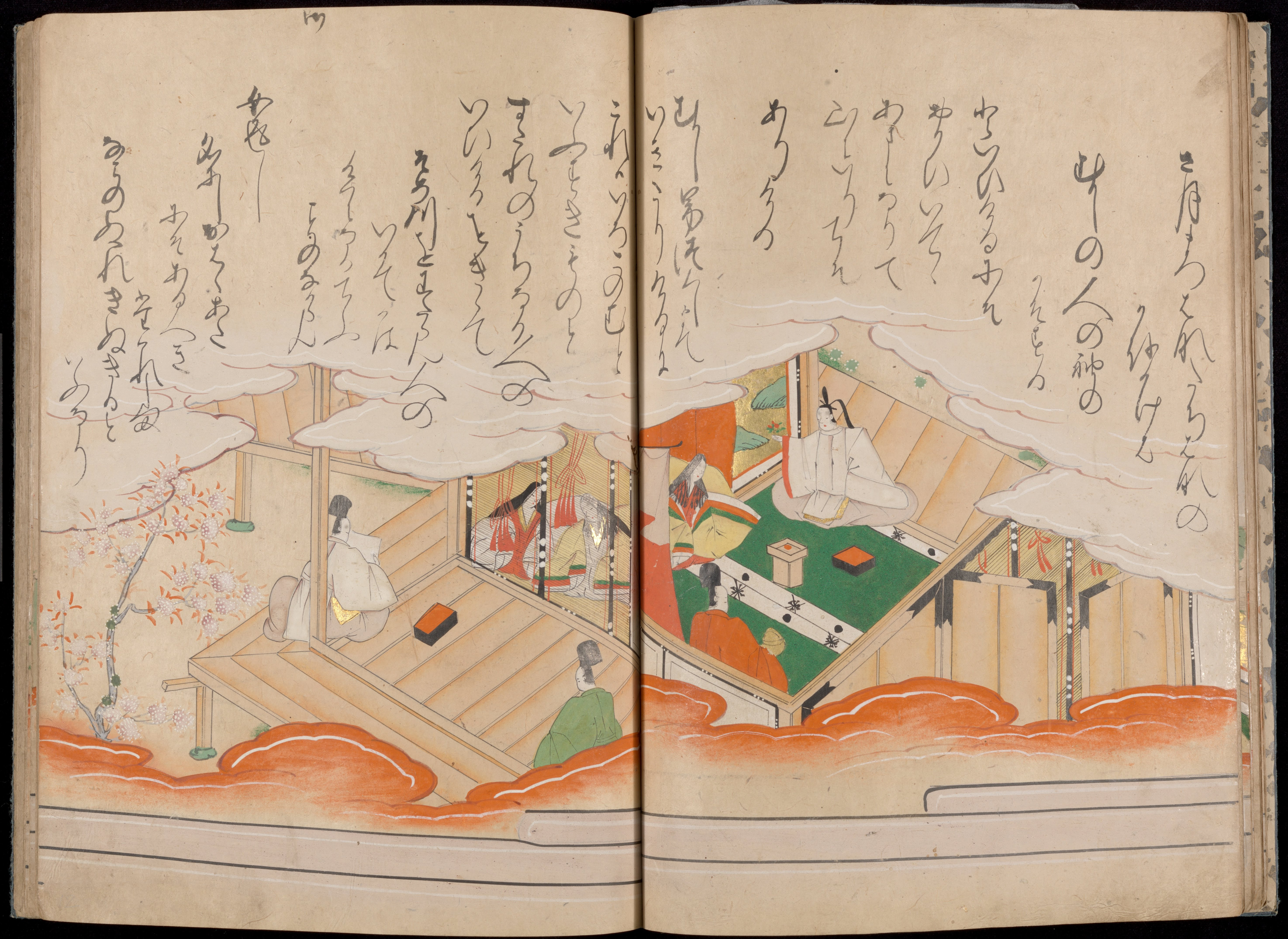
Double-page from the manuscript of The Tales of Ise. Japan, late 16th century. Chester Beatty Library

Uta monogatari (歌物語, literally "poem-tale") is a literary subgenre of the monogatari. It is characterized by an emphasis on waka poetry, with prose sections interspersed. While most other monogatari of the Heian period and later contain waka, the uta monogatari feature poetry as the core of successive narrative episodes, with the prose sections sometimes limited to a brief note about the composition of the poetry.

== History ==
One of the most influential and early examples of uta monogatari is the Tales of Ise. An anonymous work sometimes attributed to Ariwara no Narihira, it is a series of 125 largely unconnected prose narratives about "a man", many of said narratives beginning with the short sentence Mukashi otoko arikeri ("Long ago, there was a man"). These narratives are largely centered on poetry composed by the "man", usually identified as a fictionalized version of Narihira.

The name uta monogatari was first applied to the subgenre during the Meiji period.

== Notable examples ==
- Heichū Monogatari
- Tales of Ise
- Yamato Monogatari
- Takamura Monogatari
