= Hamamatsu Chūnagon Monogatari =

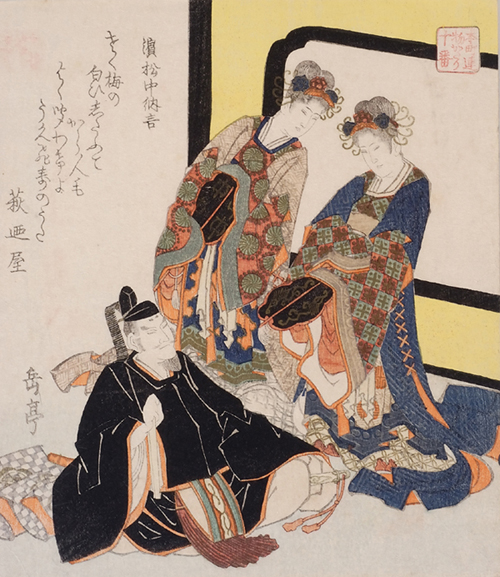
Woodcut of a scene from Hamamatsu Chūnagon Monogatari.Tikotin Museum of Japanese Art Collection

Hamamatsu Chūnagon Monogatari (浜松中納言物語), also known as Mitsu no Hamamatsu (御津の浜松), is an eleventh-century Japanese monogatari that tells about a chūnagon who discovers that his father has been reborn as a Chinese prince. He visits his reincarnated father in China and falls in love with the Hoyang Consort (河陽后), the Emperor's queen consort and the mother of his reborn father. The book originally comprised six chapters, but the first chapter has been lost.

The tale was written by a female author who employed several exotic locations. The author considers the love between a parent and a child to be "deeper, lasting and more tender" than romantic love between a man and a woman, which follows traditional virtues of filial piety.

== Plot ==
Hamamatsu Chūnagon Monogatari is the tale of a Chūnagon (a high-ranking counselor) who lost his father when he was very young. His mother marries a widower with two daughters, and he fell in love with the older daughter, Taishō no Kimi.

The Chūnagon learns in a dream that his father has been reborn as the Third Prince of the Emperor of Tang China, and he sets out on a three-year trip to meet him. Taishō no Kimi conceives a child with him as he leaves for China, upsetting her father's plans for a good match for her and leading her to become a Buddhist nun instead.

The Chūnagon becomes the darling of the Tang court and falls in love with the mother of his father's rebirth, the half-Japanese Hoyang Consort. She bears him a son, whom he brings back to Japan to live with the Hoyang Consort's mother, the Yoshino Nun.

After the Yoshino Nun passes away, Chūnagon takes her daughter, the Yoshino Princess, into his care, although a seer urges him to avoid marriage with her. Chūnagon dreams that the Hoyang Consort is very ill, and soon he is told by a spirit that she has died and is now in the Buddhist heavenly realm known as Trāyastriṃśa.

The Yoshino Princess is kidnapped by the Crown Prince and impregnated by him. The Hoyang Consort appears to Chūnagon in a dream and tells him that she has been reborn within the Yoshino Princess's unborn child. The Yoshino Princess is returned to Chūnagon.

== Characters ==
- Hamamatsu Chūnagon – described as being hapless in love, like Kaoru Genji of The Tale of Genji, but slightly more successful.
- Hoyang Consort or Tang Consort – the half-Japanese wife of the Emperor of China, mother to the Chūnagon's reincarnated father.
- Taishō no Kimi – the Chūnagon's older stepsister and lover, she conceives a child with him as he leaves for China and upsets her father's plans for a good match for her. She becomes a nun. After Hamamatsu Chūnagon returns, they live together in a "chaste yet idyllic" relationship, described as a "reworking" of the relationship between Kaoru and Ōigimi.
- Yoshino Nun – the Japanese mother of the Hoyang Consort.
- Yoshino Princess – daughter of the Yoshino Nun, half-sister of the Hoyang Consort.
- Wakagimi – son of the Chūnagon and the Hoyang Consort.
- Crown Prince – the Chūnagon's rival.

== Authorship ==
Authorship of the tale has been traditionally ascribed to 'Takasue's daughter', the author of Sarashina Nikki. The tale was probably completed between the 1060s and the 1070s, and no copies of the first chapter exist.

== Reception ==
The Mumyōzōshi, written by a female author between 1200 and 1202, which critiques various Heian tales, criticises the tale for the too-soon rebirth of the Hoyang Consort into the human world, when a person born into a heavenly realm is meant to remain there for a long time.

Unlike The Tale of Genji and Sagoromo Monogatari, Hamamatsu Chūnagon Monogatari pays little attention to the seasons or "the atmosphere of the time of day".

Shūichi Katō describes the plot as "totally divorced from reality" because of its use of dreams. Dreams are a staple plot device in Heian tales, and they are an especially important part of the plot in Hamamatsu Chūnagon Monogatari. The author's use of dreams "suggests considerable sophistication of narrative technique" to Harries.

Katō criticizes the characterization, saying that the events are so unusual that the characters "become puppets", buffeted around by the author. In one example, Katō found it "difficult to the point of impossibility" to guess the emotions of the Hamamatsu Chunagon on meeting his reborn father. Videen also criticises the characterisation – Hamamatsu Chunagon Monogatari takes place over six years, not a lifetime, as in Genji, but even so she considers the character of the Hamamatsu Chunagon to be "much the same" at the close of the tale as at the beginning, and the female characters to be "flat".

The relationships in Hamamatsu have parallels in Genji - the love triangle between the Chunagon, the Yoshino Princess and the Crown Prince is like that between Kaoru, Ukifune and Prince Niō. Also, for the Chunagon, the Yoshino Princess is a replacement love for the Hoyang Consort, her close relative. This is similar to Hikaru Genji's relationship with Murasaki, after his relationship with her aunt, Fujitsubo. The Hoyang Consort's uneasy relationship with the other consorts of the Chinese Emperor is considered similar to that between the Kiritsubo Consort, Genji's mother, and the Emperor's other consorts. Several monogatari motifs are present in the tale. The author of the Mumyozoshi considers these familiar motifs as satisfying, although later generations would consider them derivative.

Although the tale is considered less accomplished than The Tale of Genji, it illuminates the way Japanese literature developed after The Tale of Genji.

== Translations ==
Thomas H. Rohlich translated the tale as A Tale of Eleventh Century Japan: Hamamatsu Chunagon Monogatari in 1983, including a summary of the missing first chapter. Rabinovich praises his introduction as "informative and scholarly", but criticises it for suggesting but not discussing the topic of "the intrinsic value of the work". Videen regrets that the many tanka (short poems) in the work were not discussed more fully in the introduction.

== Adaptations ==
The dream and rebirth themes of Hamamatsu Chūnagon Monogatari inspired Yukio Mishima's Spring Snow, and a former teacher of his had recently released an edition of Hamamatsu as Mishima began work on Spring Snow. The tale was also adapted for the stage by the Takarazuka Revue in 2005, under the name Sleeping Moon (睡れる月, Nemureru Tsuki).

== See also ==
- Torikaebaya Monogatari – a later tale with similar themes.

== Bibliography ==
- Kubota, Jun (2007). Iwanami Nihon Koten Bungaku Jiten [Iwanami Dictionary of Japanese Classical Literature] (in Japanese). Tokyo: Iwanami Shoten. ISBN 978-4-00-080310-6. OCLC 122941872.
