= Mumyōzōshi =

13th-century Japanese text on prose literary criticism

Mumyōzōshi (無名草子; literally "nameless book") is an early 13th-century Japanese text. One volume in length, it is the oldest existing Japanese text on prose literary criticism. The author is unknown, but the leading candidate proposed is referred to as 'Shunzei's daughter'. Other candidates who have been proposed include her maternal grandfather, Fujiwara no Shunzei himself, and the Buddhist monk Jōgaku (上覚).

== Composition ==
One manuscript gives the title as Kenkyū Monogatari (建久物語), a reference to the Japanese era name in which it was written. Composition occurred between 1200 and 1202.

The author is unknown. Hypotheses include Fujiwara no Shunzei (c. 1114 -1204); his granddaughter, often called 'Shunzei's daughter' (c. 1171 - 1252); Jōkaku (1147-1226); and Princess Shikishi (1149-1201); but strongest support is for Shunzei's daughter.

== Contents ==
The volume is composed of four distinct sections: a preface, literary criticism, poetic criticism, and a discussion on prominent literary women.

The preface introduces an 83-year-old woman on a trip. She stops to rest at a house, where she writes down the conversation of a group of women talking about literature, creating a frame tale excuse to write the volume. The frame tale itself has many elements from monogatari of the time.

The literary criticism covers 28 stories, including Genji Monogatari, Sagoromo Monogatari (ja), Yoru no Nezame, Hamamatsu Chūnagon Monogatari, and Torikaebaya Monogatari. The others mostly do not exist anymore.

For poetic criticism, it covers Ise Monogatari, Yamato Monogatari, Man'yōshū, and private and imperial collections. The editor laments the lack of women compilers in the collections.

It then goes on to discuss the ability and upbringing of a number of prominent women: Ono no Komachi, Sei Shōnagon, Izumi Shikibu, Akazome Emon, Murasaki Shikibu and others.

The text is particularly valuable as a resource, since it includes descriptions of a number of either completely or partially lost texts.

== See also ==
- Fūyō Wakashū, a collection of poetry from various literary sources, many of which are no longer extant

== Bibliography ==
- Hayashiya, Tatsusaburō (1973). Nihon Shisō Taikei 23: Kodai Chūsei Geijutsuron (in Japanese). Iwanami Shoten. ISBN 4-00-070023-5.
- Marra, Michele (1984). "Mumyōzōshi: Introduction and Translation". Monumenta Nipponica. 39 (2): 115–145. doi:10.2307/2385013. JSTOR 2385013.
- Kubota, Jun (2007). Iwanami Nihon Koten Bungaku Jiten [Iwanami Dictionary of Japanese Classical Literature] (in Japanese). Tokyo: Iwanami Shoten. ISBN 978-4-00-080310-6. OCLC 122941872.
- Nihon Koten Bungaku Daijiten: Kan'yakuban [A Comprehensive Dictionary of Classical Japanese Literature: Concise Edition]. Tōkyō: Iwanami Shoten. 1986. ISBN 4-00-080067-1. OCLC 22820487.
