= Takasue's daughter =

11th-century Japanese author

Takasue's Daughter
- Born: c. 1008; Kyoto, Japan
- Died: 1058 or later
- Occupations: Poet; Provincial Governor; Author
- Spouse: Tachibana no Toshimichi (husband)
- Children: 2
- Father: Sugawara no Takasue

Sugawara no Takasue no musume (菅原孝標女; c.1008 – after 1059), also known as Takasue's Daughter and Lady Sarashina, was a Japanese noble woman, poet, and author best known for writing the Sarashina Nikki, a Heian period travel diary recording her life and travels from her teenage years to her fifties. She is also attributed by some scholars as the author of Hamamatsu Chūnagon Monogatari and Yoru no Nezame. Her personal name is unknown.

== Name ==
"Sugawara no Takasue no musume" is literally translated as "daughter of Sugawara no Takasue". In ancient Japanese society, women's personal names were generally not recorded in genealogical records. British scholar Ivan Morris, a translator of her diary, referred to her as Lady Sarashina.

Her surname distinguishes her as a direct descendant of Sugawara no Michizane, a prominent statesman, scholar, and poet of the Heian period.

In the Heian period, there was a cultural practice of avoiding the use of personal names, as people feared someone could control them by a message sent to their true name with the power of kotodama. The general belief was nobody could control a person with the power of kotodama unless their true name had been revealed. Therefore, the true names of Heian women writers were not disclosed even in their own writing.

== Life ==
Most of Takasue's Daughter's life is known from her entries in the Sarashina Nikki. However, the diary itself does not note specific dates nor proper names. An annotated copy of the diary handwritten by Fujiwara no Teika provides reliable historical information on dates and names.

=== Early life and family ===
Takasue's Daughter was born in Kyoto in approximately 1008. Her father was Sugawara no Takasue, who later became the provincial governor of Kazusa and Hitachi Provinces. Her mother was a younger sister of Michitsuna's mother, the author of the Kagero Nikki.

From ages ten to thirteen, she lived in Kazusa Province, where her father was serving as provincial governor. When she was approximately twelve years old, she began recording a daily account of her events which would later become known as the Sarashina Nikki. In 1020, as her father's term in Kazusa Province expired, her family returned to Kyoto and lived in a large residence on Sanjo Street until 1023, when the house burned down. According to her diary, her family started living in temporary places. The following year in 1024, her elder sister died in childbirth and in 1025, Sugawara no Takasue failed to obtain a provincial governorship, meaning a period of financial difficulty for the family.

In 1032 when she was approximately 25, her father received a provincial governor posting in Hitachi, where he served for 4 years. As his posting was far away in the East Country, she stayed with her mother in the capital. After Takasue moved back to Kyoto, her mother became a nun but remained in the household. It is presumed that Takasue's daughter assumed duties of mistress of the household for her retired father.

=== Court service ===
In 1039, Takasue's Daughter received an invitation to serve as a lady-in-waiting for infant Princess Yushi (1038-1105), the third princess of Emperor Gosuzaku. Her service in this household would have brought her in contact with the highest-ranking members of Heian society.

During one of her periods of service in 1042, she had an encounter with high-ranking courtier Minamoto no Sukemichi (d. 1060). This marked the high point of her court career as she was able to converse and exchange poetry with someone who fulfilled the ideal of a courtly gentleman as portrayed in tale literature. A poem she composed during that meeting secured her a place in the Shinkokinshu, one of the two most prestigious Japanese imperial anthologies of all time.

=== Marriage ===
In 1040, her parents arranged for her to marry Tachibana no Toshimichi, a middle-ranking aristocrat. They had at least two children. The marriage did not end her court career entirely, and she continued to serve from time to time.

She would have been 33 years old at the beginning of her marriage, a late age at a time when most married in their early teens. In Heian aristocratic society, duolocal residence, where a woman was visited by her husband in her own home, was common. Since Takasue's Daughter lost her house in a fire in 1023, and her father failed to obtain a provincial governorship in 1025, she is left without a suitable grand residence, meaning her family would have been unable to arrange a good marriage for her.

In 1058, her husband died. Takasue's daughter lived on after her husband's death, but it is unknown how long. Her last entry in the Sarashina Diary is recorded approximately a year after his death.

=== Fascination with The Tale of Genji ===
Takasue's Daughter was born in the same year that The Tale of Genji began to circulate as a completed manuscript. During her time growing up in Kazusa, her stepmother gave her oral renditions of episodes from The Tale of Genji and other tales, which introduced her to prose fiction and vernacular literary works. Sarashina Nikki records her interest in literary tales, and reflects her fascination with The Tale of Genji by making many allusions to the work itself.
