= Sarashina Nikki =

Japanese memoir

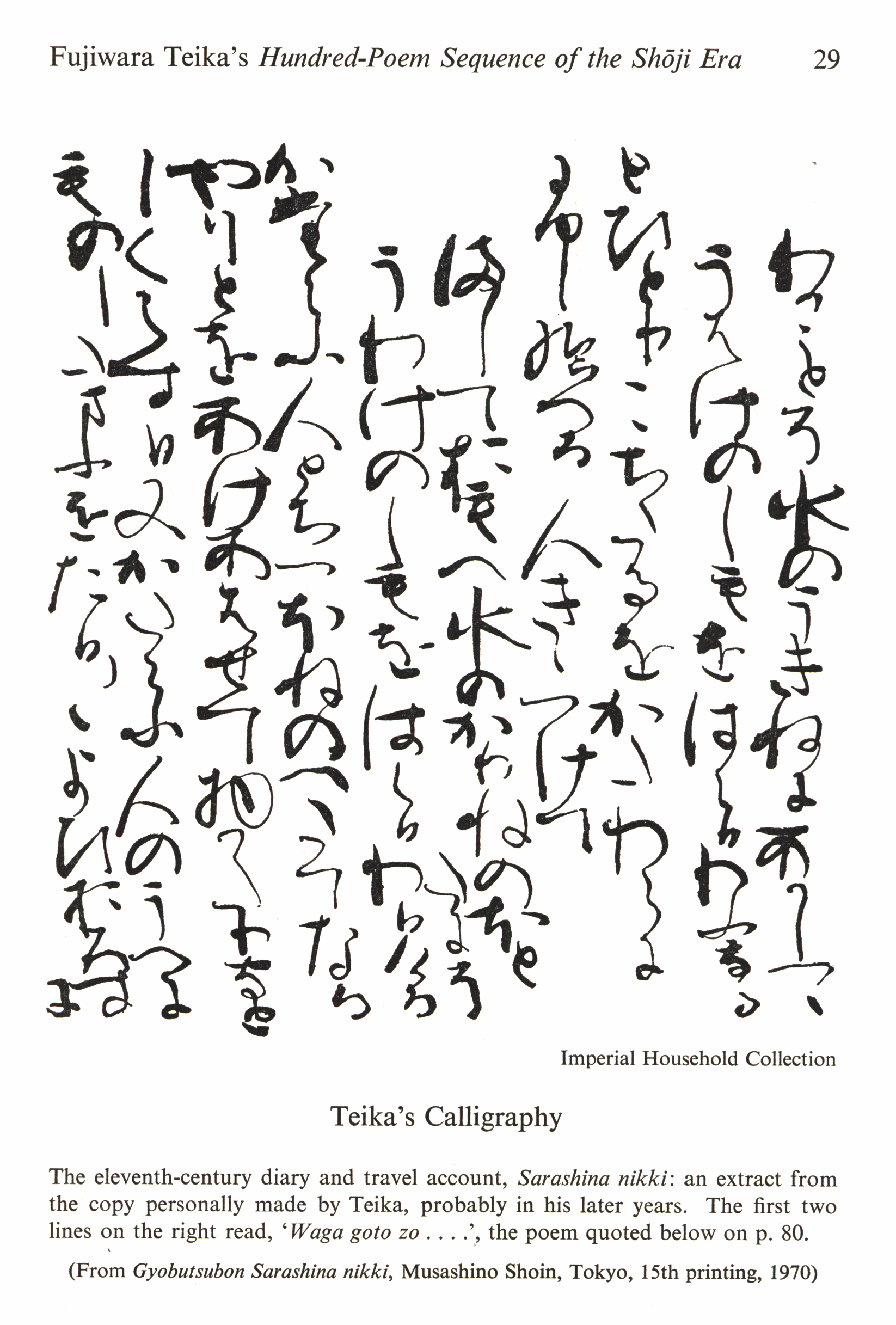
Manuscripts written by Fujiwara no Teika

The Sarashina Diary (更級日記, Sarashina Nikki) is a memoir written by the daughter of Sugawara no Takasue, a lady-in-waiting of Heian-period Japan. Her work stands out for its descriptions of her travels and pilgrimages and is unique in the literature of the period, as well as one of the first in the genre of travel writing.

Takasue's daughter was a niece on her mother's side of Michitsuna's mother, author of another famous diary of the period, the Kagerō Nikki, whose personal name has also been lost. Other than the Sarashina Diary, she may also have authored Hamamatsu Chūnagon Monogatari, Mizukara kuyuru ('Self-reproach'), the Yoru no Nezame, and the Tale of Asakura.

This work is one of the six major literary memoirs/diaries written in the mid-Heian period, roughly from 900 to 1100. Lady Sarashina wrote her work with awareness of her distinguished lineage. She had a desire to produce something that would be worthy for her family line. This desire stemmed from her knowledge that autobiographical writing by women of her generation had achieved fame, which had assisted the writers' careers and their family lines. Her intention is evident in her text, as evidenced by careful editing.

Extracts from the work are part of Japanese high school students' classical Japanese studies.

== The author and the book ==
Takasue's daughter, who was also known as 'Lady Sarashina', wrote her memoirs in her later years. She was born in 1008 and, in her childhood, travelled with her father, an assistant governor, to the provinces and, some years later, back to the capital. Her remembrances of the long, three-month journey back to the capital are unique in Heian literature, if terse and geographically inaccurate. Here she describes Mount Fuji, then an active volcano:

It has a most unusual shape and seems to have been painted deep blue; its thick cover of unmelting snow gives the impression that the mountain is wearing a white jacket over a dress of deep violet.

The Sarashina Diary recorded her life from the age of 12 to her fifties. Her memoirs start with her childhood days, when she delighted in reading tales, and prayed to be able to read the Tale of Genji from beginning to end. She records her joy when presented with a complete copy, and how she dreamed of living a romance like those described in it. When her life does not turn out as well as she had hoped, she blames her addiction to tales, which made her live in a fantasy world and neglect her spiritual growth. These records are impressive memories of Lady Sarashina's travel and dreams, and of her day-to-day life.

She spent her youth living at her father's house. In her thirties, she married Tachibana no Toshimichi, a government official, and from time to time seems to have served at court. At the end of her memoirs, she expresses her deep grief at her husband's death. Heian literature conventionally expresses sorrow at life's brevity, but Lady Sarashina conveys her pain and regret over the loss of those she has loved with passionate directness. She stopped writing at some time in her fifties, and no details about her own death are known.

Lady Sarashina's birth name is unknown, and she is called either Takasue's daughter or Lady Sarashina. Sarashina is a geographical district never mentioned in the diary, but it is alluded to in a reference to Mount Obasute, also known as Mount Sarashina, in one of the book's poems (itself an adaptation of an earlier poem). This, and the fact that her husband's last appointment was to the province of Shinano (Nagano), probably led later scholars to use "Sarashina" as a point of identification for the text and its author.

Although the term nikki means ‘diary’ in English, it is unclear if Sarashina Nikki should be classified as a diary or as other forms of literature, mainly ‘journal’ or ‘memoir’. The content of Sarashina Nikki does not perfectly fit the term ‘diary’ in English, which is most commonly understood as private daily records of events. Rather than a diary with daily entries, Sarashina Nikki recorded mainly emotional events and poetic correspondences. She also left out, or did not elaborate much on, the events that would normally be included in a diary, such as accounts of the author's marriage, the births of her children, or her family connections.

This diary largely consists of Lady Sarashina's struggle with romance, written in prose and poetry. The prose focused on the narration of events, scenery, or retrospective reflection, while the poetry had a central emotional element and acted as a secondary narrative. Themes included infatuation in literature and how it can delude a person by distorting life expectations, how it can interfere with Buddhist salvation, and how literature can console a person.

== Dreams ==
The Sarashina Diary is considered unique among other Heian diaries because dreams are an important part in her work. There are eleven dreams identified in the Sarashina Diary. Some of the dreams are:

1. Memorizing the Lotus Sutra
2. The construction of ornamental stream at the Hexagonal Hall, and an order to worship Amaterasu
3. Monk's divine dream of a mirror offered by Lady Sarashina's mother
4. A good omen bestowed by the Inari Shrine
5. The appearance of Amida Buddha in the front garden of Lady Sarashina's house

The dreams in Sarashina Nikki are believed to convey Lady Sarashina's dissatisfaction with society. It is a work that portrays her personal ways of coping with her social issues of her time, that is to be submerged in dreams and neglecting reality.

== Manuscripts ==
The most authoritative copy of Sarashina Nikki is one produced by Fujiwara no Teika in the 13th century, some two hundred years after Lady Sarashina wrote the original. Teika is one of the most famous poets during his day, and he was one of the members of the committee that compiled the Shinkokinshu, and was the sole compiler of the Shinchokusenshu. He played an important role in preserving and passing on the Heian texts that have come to constitute the canon of Japanese classical literature. Teika copied Lady Sarashina's work once, but his first transcription was borrowed and lost; the manuscript he worked from was itself a second-generation copy of a lost transcription. To compound the problems, sometime in the 17th century Teika's transcription was re-bound, but the binder changed the order of the original in seven places, making the diary less valuable and more difficult for scholars to understand. In 1924, Nobutsuna Sasaki and Kōsuke Tamai, two classical literature scholars, examined the original Teika manuscript and finally discovered what had happened, leading to a reevaluation of Sarashina's work. It is from this correctly re-ordered version that all modern versions are made.
