= Monogatari =

Literary form in Japanese literature

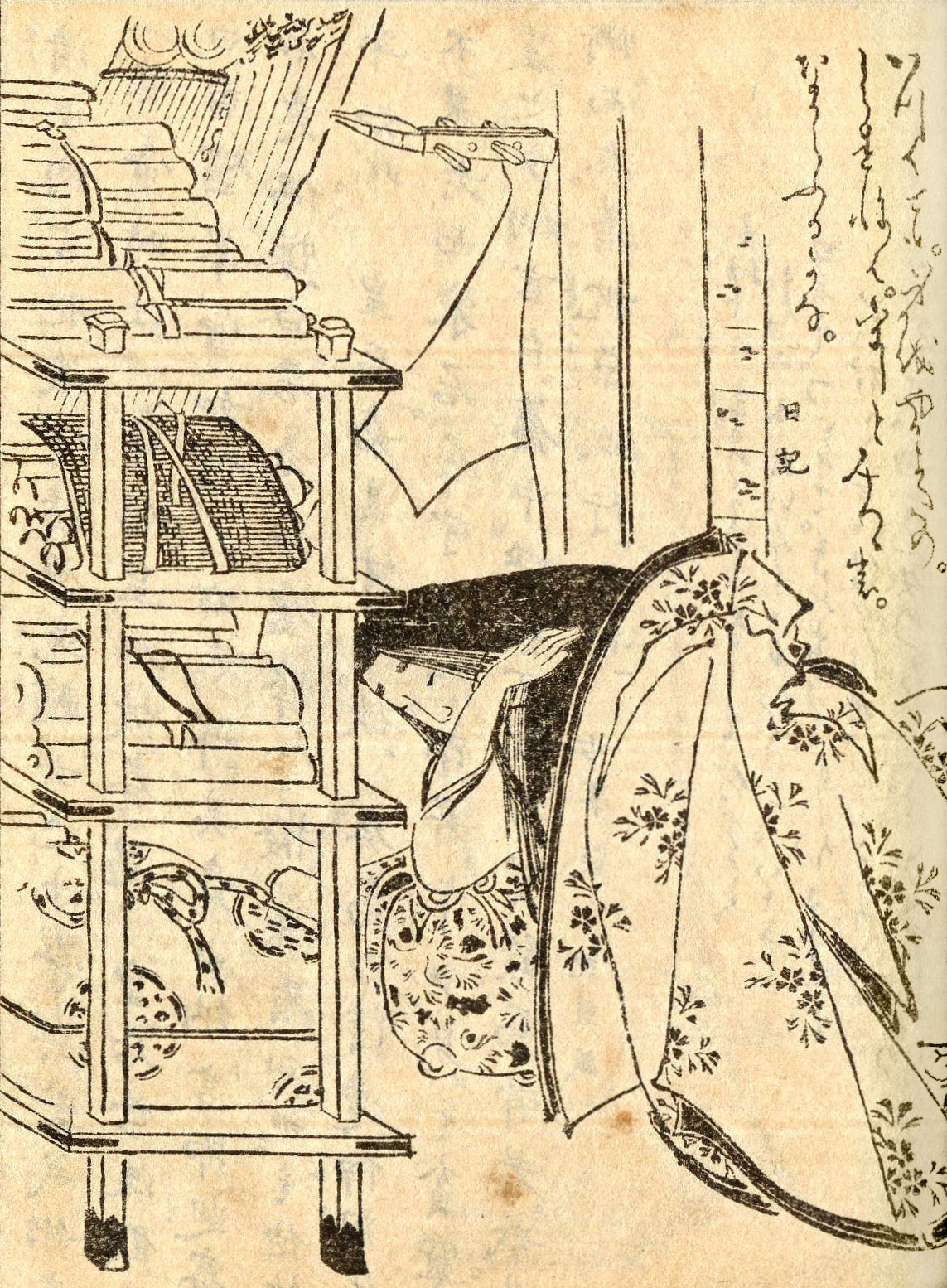
Murasaki Shikibu, author of Genji monogatari (The Tale of Genji)

Monogatari (Japanese: 物語; [monoɡaꜜtaɾi]) is a literary form in traditional Japanese literature – an extended prose narrative tale comparable to epic literature. Monogatari is closely tied to aspects of the oral tradition, and almost always relates a fictional or fictionalized story, even when retelling a historical event. Many of the great works of Japanese fiction, such as the Genji Monogatari and the Heike Monogatari, are in the monogatari form.

== History ==
The form was prominent around the 9th to 15th centuries, reaching a peak between the 10th and 13th centuries. Monogatari was the court literature during the Heian era and also persisted in the form of archaic fiction until the sixteenth century. The Fūyō Wakashū (1271) indicates that at least 198 monogatari existed by the 13th century. Today, only 24 exist.

== Genres ==
The genre is subdivided into multiple categories depending on their contents:

=== Denki-monogatari ===
Stories dealing with fantastical events.

- Taketori Monogatari (The Tale of the Bamboo Cutter)
- Utsubo Monogatari (The Tale of the Hollow Tree)
- Hyakumonogatari Kaidankai

=== Uta-monogatari ===
Stories drawn from poetry.

- Heichū Monogatari (Tales of Heichū)
- Ise Monogatari (Tales of Ise)
- Yamato Monogatari (Tales of Yamato)

=== Tsukuri-monogatari ===
Aristocratic court romances.

- Genji Monogatari (The Tale of Genji)
- Hamamatsu Chūnagon Monogatari
- Ochikubo Monogatari (The Tale of Ochikubo)
- Sagoromo Monogatari
- Torikaebaya Monogatari
- Tsutsumi Chūnagon Monogatari
- Yoru no Nezame (Wakeful Nights)

=== Rekishi-monogatari ===
Historical tales that emerged during the late Heian period, flourishing until the medieval age. These narratives were commonly written in kanbun (hybrid form of Chinese) or wabun (Japanese). Two of the most notable of this monogatari included the Eiga Monogatari and Ōkagami, which both narrated the story of Michinaga, the renowned Fujiwara regent.

=== Gunki-monogatari ===
Military chronicles and stories about war.

- Gikeiki (The Tale of Yoshitsune)
- Heiji Monogatari (The Tale of Heiji)
- Heike Monogatari (The Tale of the Heike)
- Hōgen Monogatari (The Tale of Hōgen)
- Soga Monogatari (The Tale of the Soga Brothers)
- Taiheiki (Chronicle of Great Peace)

=== Setsuwa-monogatari ===
Anecdotal tales.

- Konjaku Monogatarishū (Tales of Times Now Past)
- Uji Shūi Monogatari (A Collection of Tales from Uji)

=== Giko-monogatari ===
Pseudo-classical imitations of earlier tales.

- Matsuranomiya Monogatari
- Sumiyoshi Monogatari

== Influence ==
When European and other foreign literature later became known to Japan, the word monogatari began to be used in Japanese titles of foreign works of a similar nature. For example, A Tale of Two Cities is known as Nito Monogatari (二都物語), One Thousand and One Nights as Sen'ichiya Monogatari (千一夜物語) and more recently The Lord of the Rings as Yubiwa Monogatari (指輪物語) and To Kill a Mockingbird as Arabama Monogatari (アラバマ物語).

== See also ==
- Fūyō Wakashū, a 13th-century collection of poetry from various monogatari sources, many of which are no longer extant
- Konjaku Monogatarishū, a collection of Heian period Buddhist folklore
- Mumyōzōshi, a 13th-century literary critique on monogatari, many of which are no longer extant
