= Ukifune =

Princess and chapter in The Tale of Genji

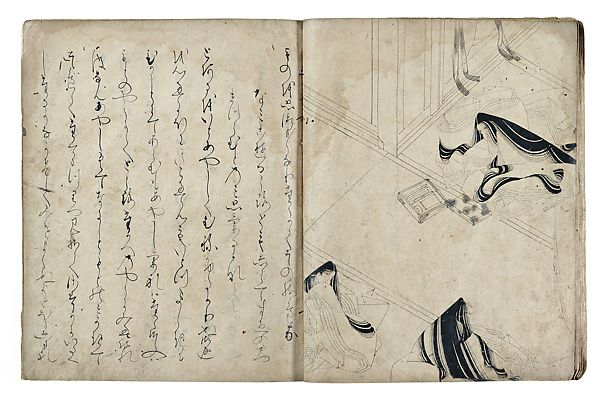
A page from a 13th-century illustrated version of the "A Boat Cast Adrift" / "Ukifune" chapter in The Tale of Genji. In it, Ukifune reads a letter from Kaoru reproaching her for being unfaithful to him with Prince Niō, and Ukifune nervously faces her inkstone and brush and considers how to reply.

Ukifune (浮舟, うきふね) is the nickname of a princess in The Tale of Genji, the unrecognized daughter of the Eighth Prince. The 51st chapter of the story is named after her. Literally, Ukifune means "A Boat Set Adrift"; her real name is not specified.

== Story ==
Ukifune is the unrecognized daughter of the Eighth Prince, the half sister of Oigimi and Nakanokimi, and a young lady of uncommon beauty and grace. She lives with her mother at a distance from the royal court, shielding her from courtly politics; she is considered naive as such. Both Kaoru and Prince Niou court Ukifune and seek her love, and she agonizes over the proper choice. In order to release herself from the love triangle, Ukifune attempts suicide by throwing herself into the Uji River, but is unsuccessful. Having been rescued, she takes vows to become a Buddhist nun and secludes herself in Ono, at the western foot of Mount Hiei. She refuses to see Kaoru again; this story is at the very end of The Tale of Genji, so the story comes to an end without any further resolution for her.

== In culture ==
Ukifune has often been a subject of many works, including a noh piece of the same title. The song "Ukifune" by the Japanese indie band GO!GO!7188 refers directly to the story.

== Gallery ==
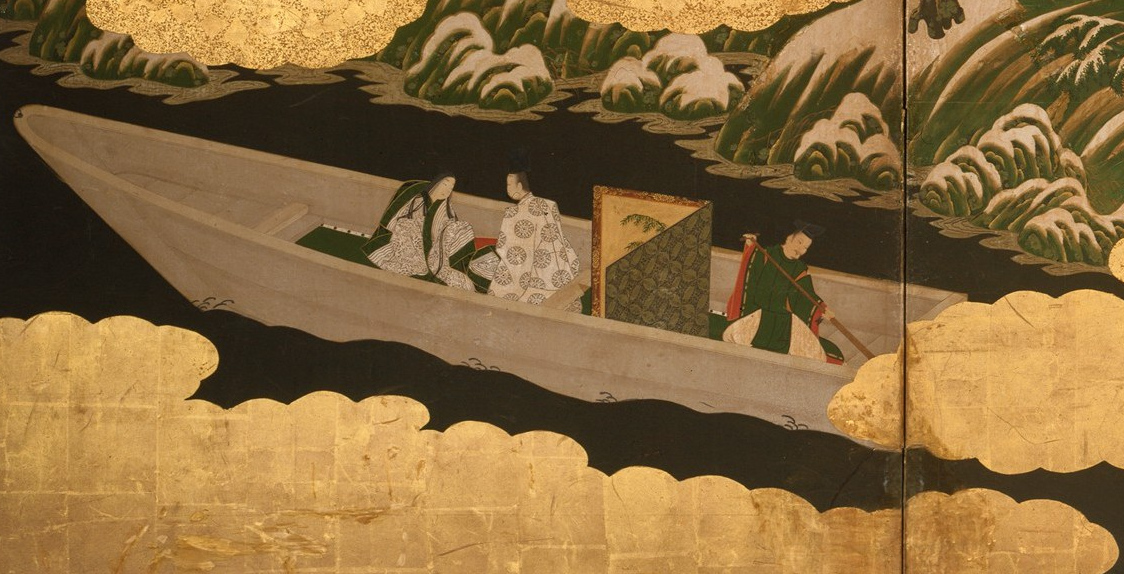
A folding screen with artwork of Ukifune being taken by boat by Prince Niō to his cottage

== See also ==
- Heian period
