= Utsubo Monogatari =

10th century Japanese story

Utsubo Monogatari (うつほ物語, "The Tale of the Hollow Tree") (Note: The historical spelling うつほ (utsuho) corresponds to the modern pronunciation utsuo (plain) or utsubo (with dakuon).) is a late 10th century Japanese story. It is Japan's oldest full-length narrative. Twenty volumes exist that are dominated by two plotlines: about a family of master virtuosos who have learnt the art of playing the koto from celestial beings and acquired it as a hereditary gift from a Buddha and the story of a rich court nobleman named Minamoto no Masayori from the Fujiwara family and his ninth daughter Atemiya, who is the subject of courtship by many nobles, Atemiya becomes the wife of the emperor and her son his successor.

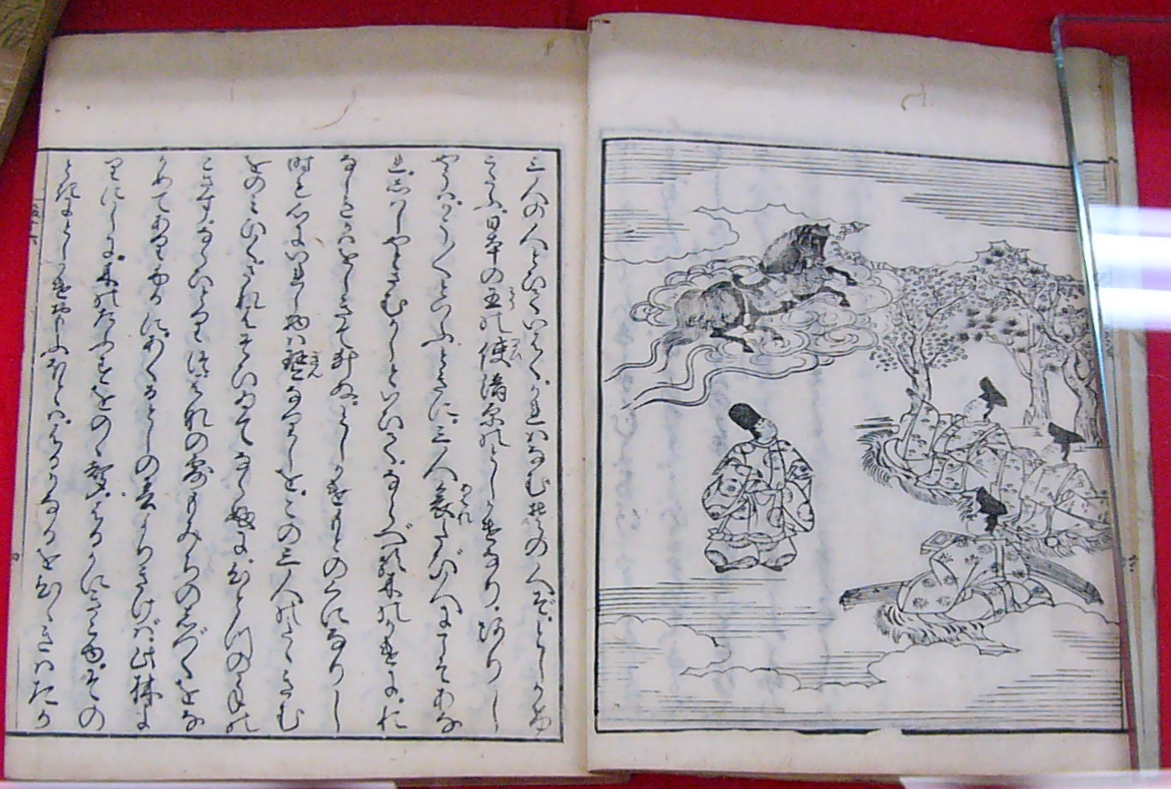
1809 edition

== Composition ==
The author is unknown. Minamoto no Shitagō is cited as a likely candidate; however, it may have had multiple authors spanning a number of years. The text is referenced in a number of later works such as Kagerō Nikki (c. 977), Makura no Sōshi (1002), and Genji Monogatari (c. 1021), suggesting compilation between c. 970 and 999.

The text is illustrated in an emakimono by Asukabe no Tsunenori, with calligraphy by Ono no Michikaze.

== References to the Utsuho Monogatari ==
=== Makura no Sōshi ===
A variety of references to the Ustuho monogatari are found in works after its completion. One of them is the Makura no Sōshi by Sei Shōnagon. In her work she expresses symphaty for Nakatada in his attempt at courtship with Atemiya as both Nakatada and Suzushi, another noble trying to court Amemiya, play the koto to win her heart. Shōnagon and the wife of the emperor who she serves discuss the suitability of Nakatada and while the emperor's wife criticises Nakatada's low birth, Shōnagon argues for his courtship because of his koto play that even beckoned the heavenly beings.

=== Genji Monogatari ===
Two testimonies in the Genji Monogatari refer explicitly to the utsuho monogatari. Another one refers to the Utsuho monogatari possibly as "mukashi monogatari" ("old tale"). In one passage two pictures are compared between the old man of the Taketori Monogatari (taketori no okina) and Toshikage of the Utsuho Monogatari (utsuho no Toshikage).

Another reference is the criticism the author of the Genji Monogatari has against either Atemiya who refuses the courtship of many nobles to then marry the emperor or against a calculating concubine of the emperor in the chapter Kuniyudzuri who manages to make her son into the crown prince.

One possible reference is found the chapter Wakana II. The protagonist Genji listens to koto performances and is disappointed that no one plays truly masterfully as no one plays as well to shake heaven and earth, appeasing gods and demons, and to play to achieve wealth from a place of low estate. If this reference is true, the people Genji talked to were familiar with the central role of the koto within the work that he does not have to name the title nor protagonist of the work.

== Title ==
The title of the story, The Tale of the Hollow Tree, is taken from an incident in the first chapter "Toshikage". The title refers to the bear den formed by trees in which the protagonist Nakatada and his mother flee to, to live there. The ateji 宇津保 are also used.

== Contents ==
The story is twenty volumes in length and revolves around a mystical harp that passes through four generations. It belongs to the monogatari genre and is subclassified as a denki monogatari.

It contains the following chapters:

Chapter	Title
1	Toshikage (俊蔭)
2	Tadakoso (忠こそ)
3	Fujiwara no Kimi (藤原の君)
4	Saga no In (嵯峨院)
5	Ume no Hanagasa (梅の花笠)
6	Fukiage (jō) (吹上(上))
7	Fukiage (ge) (吹上(下))
8	Matsuri no Tsukai (祭の使)
9	Kiku no En (菊の宴)
10	Atemiya (あて宮)
11	Hatsuaki (初秋)
12	Tazu no Muradori (田鶴の群鳥)
13	Kurabiraki (jō) (蔵開(上))
14	Kurabiraki (chū) (蔵開(中))
15	Kurabiraki (ge) (蔵開(下))
16	Kuniyuzuri (jō) (国譲(上))
17	Kuniyuzuri (chū) (国譲(中))
18	Kuniyuzuri (ge) (国譲(下))
19	Rō no Ue (jō) (楼上(上))
20	Rō no Ue (ge) (楼上(下))

The story is generally divided into three major sections:

1. Chapters 1-12: Toshikage is sent to China but shipwrecks in Persia. He obtains the mystical harps and returns to Japan. He has a daughter and teaches her music. The daughter has a son, Nakatada, and raises him in hollow tree. Nakatada seeks marriage to Atemiya.
2. Chapters 13-18: Various political rivalries revolving around the Nakatada household and the crown prince.
3. Chapters 19-20: Nakatada passes on the family musical traditions to Inumiya

== Translations ==
An English translation by Ziro Uraki was published in 1984 by Shinozaki Shorin under the title The Tale of the Cavern (Utsuho Monogatari) (ISBN 4784104372).

== Sources ==
- Benl, Oscar (1966): Die Geschichte des Prinzen Genji. 2. Volume. Zürich: Manesse.
- Endress, G., & Großmann, E. (2024). Utsuho monogatari: Textgeschichte, Forschungsstand, ausgewählte Texte in Übersetzung. Gesellschaft für Natur- und Völkerkunde Ostasiens e.V.
- Kōno, Tama (1959). Iwanami Koten Bungaku Taikei 10: Utsubo Monogatari (in Japanese). Iwanami Shoten. ISBN 4-00-060010-9.
- Kōno, Tama (1960). Iwanami Koten Bungaku Taikei 11: Utsubo Monogatari (in Japanese). Iwanami Shoten. ISBN 4-00-060011-7.
- Kōno, Tama (1962). Iwanami Koten Bungaku Taikei 12: Utsubo Monogatari (in Japanese). Iwanami Shoten. ISBN 4-00-060012-5.
- Kubota, Jun (2007). Iwanami Nihon Koten Bungaku Jiten [Iwanami Dictionary of Japanese Classical Literature] (in Japanese). Tokyo: Iwanami Shoten. ISBN 978-4-00-080310-6. OCLC 122941872.
- Nihon Koten Bungaku Daijiten: Kan'yakuban [A Comprehensive Dictionary of Classical Japanese Literature: Concise Edition]. Tōkyō: Iwanami Shoten. 1986. ISBN 4-00-080067-1. OCLC 22820487.
