= Takamura Monogatari =

Japanese literature

The Takamura Monogatari (篁物語; literally "tale of Takamura"), also called the Takamura Nikki (篁日記; "diary of Takamura") or the Ono no Takamura shū (小野篁集; "poetic anthology of Ono no Takamura"), is a Japanese uta monogatari that was written any time between the mid-Heian period to the early-Kamakura period. It is in one volume and consists of two distinct sections. The first section describes a young Ono no Takamura's tragic love affair with his half-sister. The second section is taken to be by a different author, and is dated somewhat later than the first. Both authors are unknown, and the poems attributed in the tale to Takamura are treated as dubious at best.
