= Heichū Monogatari =

Tales of Heichū (Heichū monogatari) belongs to the genre of uta monogatari poem tales that emerged in Japanese literature from the mid-10th to the early 11th century. As early as the Collection of Ten-Thousand Leaves (Manyōshū), a poetry collection completed around 759, there appeared poems introduced by brief prose narrations. The imperial court began to come alive with poetry from around this time. People exchanged poetry with one another on topics as diverse as love and politics and religion. Towards the end of the 9th century, it was common for individual poets to keep compilations of their own verse, sometimes explaining in prose the circumstances behind a poem's composition. The highest honor was to have ones poem selected for inclusion in the Collection of Ancient and Modern Poetry (Kokinshū), the first imperial poetry collection, which was completed around 905. By the middle of the 10th century, the idea of a poem paired with a prose narration seems to have taken hold, and Tales of Ise (Ise monogatari), Tales of Heichū, and Tales of Yamato (Yamato monogatari) seem to have emerged at about this same time. Also, the second imperial poetry collection, Collection of Later Poetry (Gosenshū), commissioned in 951 and compiled shortly thereafter, has many narrative qualities. The only extant manuscript of Tales of Heichū is a 61-page codex discovered in 1931 that seems to date from the Kamakura period (1185–1333), some three hundred years after the work's probable date of composition.

== Author ==
The author of Tales of Heichū could have been Taira no Sadafuni, whose name appears variously as Sadafun, Sadabun, Sadafumi, and Sadabumi (870?–923?), but more likely it was compiled by someone else after his death on the basis of a non-extant personal poetry collection compiled by Sadafuni himself and popular legends developing after his death. With nine poems by Sadafuni in the Collection of Ancient and Modern Poetry, he ranks fourteenth out of the 120 poets whose work appears in the only imperial anthology compiled during his lifetime.

Tales of Times Now Past (Konjaku Monogatari), is the first narrative work to equate the names Sadafun and Heichū. It has been traditionally assumed that the stories about Heichū were based on episodes in the life of the historical person Taira no Sadafun, but modern scholarship has never been able to prove this. Tales of Heichū may have reflected the real Sadafun, but clearly the intent of the work was not simply biographical. It may have been wholly fictional or based on hazy memories of an historical personage already deceased. In the stories Heichū is a courtier of imperial blood whose family has known better days. Though only of middling rank in the government bureaucracy, however, he was recognized in his own time as a sensitive poet of some talent.

== Heichū legend ==
By the mid tenth century, soon after Sadafun's death, his amatory escapades began to appear in Tales of Ise, Tales of Heichū, and Tales of Yamato. These stories continued to be told with changes and additions over the next 1000 years, his image changing in ways that reflect the cultural milieu of the time. Different authors focused on the characteristics of the hero that interested them most, whether sensitive poet or spurned lover. Later the amatory ideal turns into a profligate rake and then a ridiculous clown. Sometimes his portrayed immorality became the basis for a lecture or sermon illustrating some moral issue. He became the object of historical research and eventually appeared in a pornographic tale or two. Heichū provided a fluid and varied image as different authors used him to further their own moral and narrative ends.

Within the first fifty years of the legend's formation there appeared three of the four stock stories associated with Heichū:

• The 'mitsu' "I have seen it!" story, which is the germ of the more elaborate story of Hon'in Jijū that emerges fully developed nearly two centuries later in Tales of Times Now Past;

• Fragments of the story of Kunitsune's wife whose kidnapping later become the basis for more detailed narrations involving Heichū and Fujiwara no Tokihira;

• The story of Musashi, the maiden who takes the tonsure because she believes Heichū to have abandoned her after a single night of love-making.

Another 50 years later there emerges the fourth major story of the Heichū legend: • The 'suminuri' ink-blackening story in which Heichū inadvertently blackens his face with "tears" of ink.

Clearly by the end of the tenth century readers were beginning to laugh at the excesses of Heichū, who had once been appreciated as a lover of refined sensibility and elegant poems.
