= Nijō Taikō Taigōgū no Daini =

Japanese noblewoman

Nijō Taikō Taigōgū no Daini (二条太皇太后宮大弐, dates unknown) was a Japanese noblewoman and waka poet of the Heian period. She was a daughter of Fujiwara no Michimune (藤原通宗, 1040?–1084) and a granddaughter of Dazai no Daini Tsunehira. Her real name was Fujiwara no Muneko (藤原宗子), and she was also known as Saki no Saiin no Daini (前斎院大弐) and Kōgōgū no Daini (皇后宮大弐). She is often confused with Daini no Sanmi, as well as the similarly nicknamed wet nurse of Emperor Horikawa.

Several of her poems were included in imperial anthologies, and she had a hand in the editing of one of them, the Goshūi Wakashū, in her own day. She also left a personal anthology, Nijō Taikō Taigōgū no Daini Shū (二条太皇太后宮大弐集).

== Biography ==
The birth date of Nijō Taikō Taigōgū no Daini is unknown. She was a daughter of Fujiwara no Michimune.

She lost her father in 1084, but she was supported by her grandfather Tsunehira and her uncle Michitoshi, and collaborated in the compilation of the Goshūi Wakashū. She served under Princess Yasuko, the eldest daughter of Emperor Shirakawa, and following Yasuko's death entered the service of Princess Reishi, the third daughter of the same emperor.

The date of her death is unknown.

=== Name ===
The name by which this poet is commonly known, Nijō Taikō Taigōgū no Daini is a nickname, and her real name was likely Fuiwara no Muneko. Other names by which she is known include Saki no Saiin no Daini and Kōgōgū no Daini.

She is often confused with Daini no Sanmi (the daughter of Murasaki Shikibu), and also the other Daini no Sanmi, who was the wet nurse of Emperor Horikawa.

== Poetry ==
20 of her waka were included in imperial anthologies such as the Kin'yō Wakashū. She participated in the Ikuhō Mon'in no Ne-awase (郁芳門院根合) in the fifth month of 1093.

She left a personal anthology, the Nijō Taikō Taigōgū no Daini Shū.

== Works cited ==
- "Fujiwara no Muneko" 藤原宗子. Nihon Jinmei Daijiten Plus (in Japanese). Kodansha. 2015.
- 上野, 理 (1983). "Nijō Taikō Taigōgū no Daini". Nihon Koten Bungaku Daijiten 日本古典文学大辞典 (in Japanese). Vol. 4. Tokyo: Iwanami Shoten. pp. 594–595. OCLC 11917421.
