= Honchō Seiki =

Japanese historical text

Honchō Seiki (本朝世紀) is a historical text that categorizes and chronologizes the events listed in the Six National Histories.
