= Yamato Monogatari =

Collection of short stories

Yamato Monogatari (大和物語; "Tales of Yamato") is a collection of 173 short stories which give details about life in the imperial court in the 9th and 10th centuries.

It is an uta monogatari (a work combining narrative fiction with waka poetry) from the 10th-century Japan. The exact date of the completion of the text is unknown, but the majority of the text was completed in the year 951 by an unknown author.

== Content ==
The Ise Monogatari had a strong influence on the composition of Yamato Monogatari, one that can be seen in the fact that some of the same tales appear in both works. The appearance of many historical figures and the absence of a single main character are characteristics of this text.

== Origin ==
The poems in Yamato Monogatari were written in a time when Japanese literature and art was flourishing, after having stopped communications with China. Deciding that the declining Tang dynasty was no longer worth communicating with, Japan became increasingly more conscious of its own culture through literary and artistic works such as poetry. During the early ninth century, nearly all literary works were Chinese, but by the end of the 10th century, nearly all the best literary works were done purely in Japanese. In addition, waka poetry was becoming more popular as opposed to classical Chinese poetry, even though at first it was as if Japanese styled poetry had never existed.

At the beginning of the Heian period, waka poetry was almost never practiced due to the popularity of Chinese poetry. It was at its lowest point in history some time between 800 – 850. Waka poetry did not begin to rise in popularity until 850 – 890, where it was revived by a group of six poets who would be later known as the Six Poetic Geniuses. At the same time, waka poetry was also being used in many court activities such as poetry contests. In 951, the establishment of the wakadokoro, or Poetry Bureau, and the compilation of the Gosen Wakashū helped to promote the creation of poems and poem anthologies such as Yamato Monogatari. At the same time, the development of the kana system of writing also helped to further Japanese literature by presenting a way through which Japanese phonetics may be written and read. It was with this writing system that the many tales and poems of Yamato Monogatari were written.

From Yamato Monogatari, we are able to see what kind of life the Fujiwara court nobles and officials lived. Enjoying luxury and wielding influence, the lifestyle of the Fujiwara nobility was one informed by the aesthetics of courtliness (miyabi) and taste (fuuryuu). This helped fuel the writing style and poetry for that period of time. Poetry played a major role in their lives: acting as a pastime, and helping record the events of their daily lives. Leisure hours were spent gossiping about well-known poets and discussing the circumstances of which poems would be composed, even reminiscing about familiar poems. It was only inevitable to see that collections of these poems began to be created, one of them being Yamato Monogatari.

== Structure ==
The Yamato Monogatari as we know it today is a collection of 334 waka poems in 173 episodes. However, the original text only contains less than 300 waka poems in 172 episodes. This extra episode, along with two extra sections, was added some time after the compiling of the original text to form the Yamato Monogatari that we know today.

The poems of Yamato Monogatari can be roughly divided into two distinct parts: the first half being composed of solely waka poems about actual historical figures. 140 of these 173 episodes describe the lives of those who lived in the court circle. Over 100 different people were mentioned in Yamato Monogatari; 80 are mentioned by a name, while the rest are only referred to by their court titles. It is difficult to be able to recognize one noble from another because of the sheer number of them that are mentioned. However, it is clear that the writers of these poems were eager to know about the details of the private lives of these people.

The second half contains legends and stories told in a more literary and prose style. The sections in this prose half of Yamato Monogatari are much longer and descriptive. These legends have gone on to inspire many writers throughout Japan's history, even some authors as recent as the late 1960s.

== See also ==
- Japanese Historical Text Initiative
- Heian literature
- Motomezuka
