= Tsutsumi Chūnagon Monogatari =

Japanese collection of short stories

Tsutsumi Chūnagon Monogatari (堤中納言物語; "Tales of the Riverside Middle Counselor") is a post late-Heian period Japanese collection of short stories.

== Authorship ==
With the exception of one story, the authorship is unknown. It is likely each story was written by different authors at various times and later collected together into a single text.

"Ōsaka Koenu Gonchūnagon" is known to have been composed in 1055 by Lady Koshikibu. This is confirmed in volume 8 of Rokujō Saiin Utaawase (六条斎院歌合) which includes one of the poems from this story.

In addition, poems from "Hanazakura Oru Shōshō", "Hodohodo no Kesō", "Kaiawase", and "Haizumi" are included in the 1271 Fūyō Wakashū indicating an upper bound for these stories.

Tradition states that Fujiwara no Tameuji (1222–1286) and Fujiwara no Tamesuke (1263–1328) created copies of the manuscripts also indicating completion of the text by the 13th century.

== Contents ==
The meaning of the title is unknown. There are two main theories:

- It is a reflection of the various stories (monogatari) bound (tsutsumi) together into a single collection.
- It is a reference to Fujiwara no Kanesuke, who was known as the Riverside Middle Counselor due to his residence near the Kamo River.

The text contains ten short stories:

- "Hanazakura Oru Shōshō" (花桜折る少将)
- "Kono Tsuide" (このつゐで)
- "The Lady who Loved Insects" (虫めづる姫君, Mushi-mezuru Himegimi)
- "Hodohodo no Kesō" (ほどほどの懸想)
- "Ōsaka Koenu Gonchūnagon" (逢坂越えぬ権中納言)
- "Kaiawase" (貝あはせ)
- "Omowanu Kata ni Tomari suru Shōshō" (思はぬ方にとまりする少将)
- "Hanada no Nyōgo" (はなだの女御)
- "Haizumi" (はいずみ)
- "Yoshinashigoto" (よしなしごと)
- There is also an incomplete fragment at the end. It is untitled, but is known by its first few words as "Fuyugomoru" (冬ごもる).

== Manuscripts ==
There are approximately 60 existing manuscripts, but the original no longer exists. Each manuscript has difficult to read passages and the text as a whole needs to be supplemented by comparison with other manuscripts.
