= Jun Kubota =

Japanese literary scholar

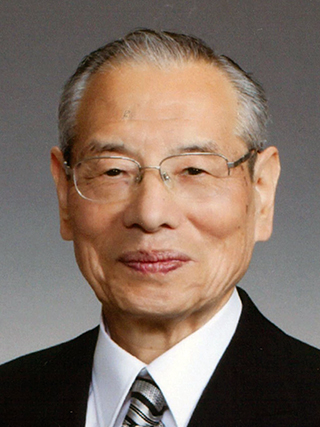
Jun Kubota

Jun Kubota (久保田 淳 Kubota Jun, born 13 June 1933) is a scholar of Japanese literature. He is best-known for his work on medieval waka.

== Life ==
Jun Kubota was born on 13 June 1933 in Tokyo.

After working as an assistant professor at Shirayuri Women's University, in 1984 he became a professor at the University of Tokyo, before returning to Shirayuri as a professor in 1994. In 2005, he joined the Japan Academy.

== Writings ==
He is a specialist in medieval Japanese literature, and his particular known for his work on the history of waka of the classical and medieval periods. His notable works include Shinkokin Wakashū Zenhyōshaku (新古今和歌集全評釈) and Fujiwara no Teika to Sono Jidai (藤原定家とその時代).

== Honours ==
- Order of the Sacred Treasure, 2nd class, Gold and Silver Star (2007)
- Person of Cultural Merit (2013)
- Order of Culture (2020)
