= Takuhadachijihime =

Japanese deity (kami) of textiles

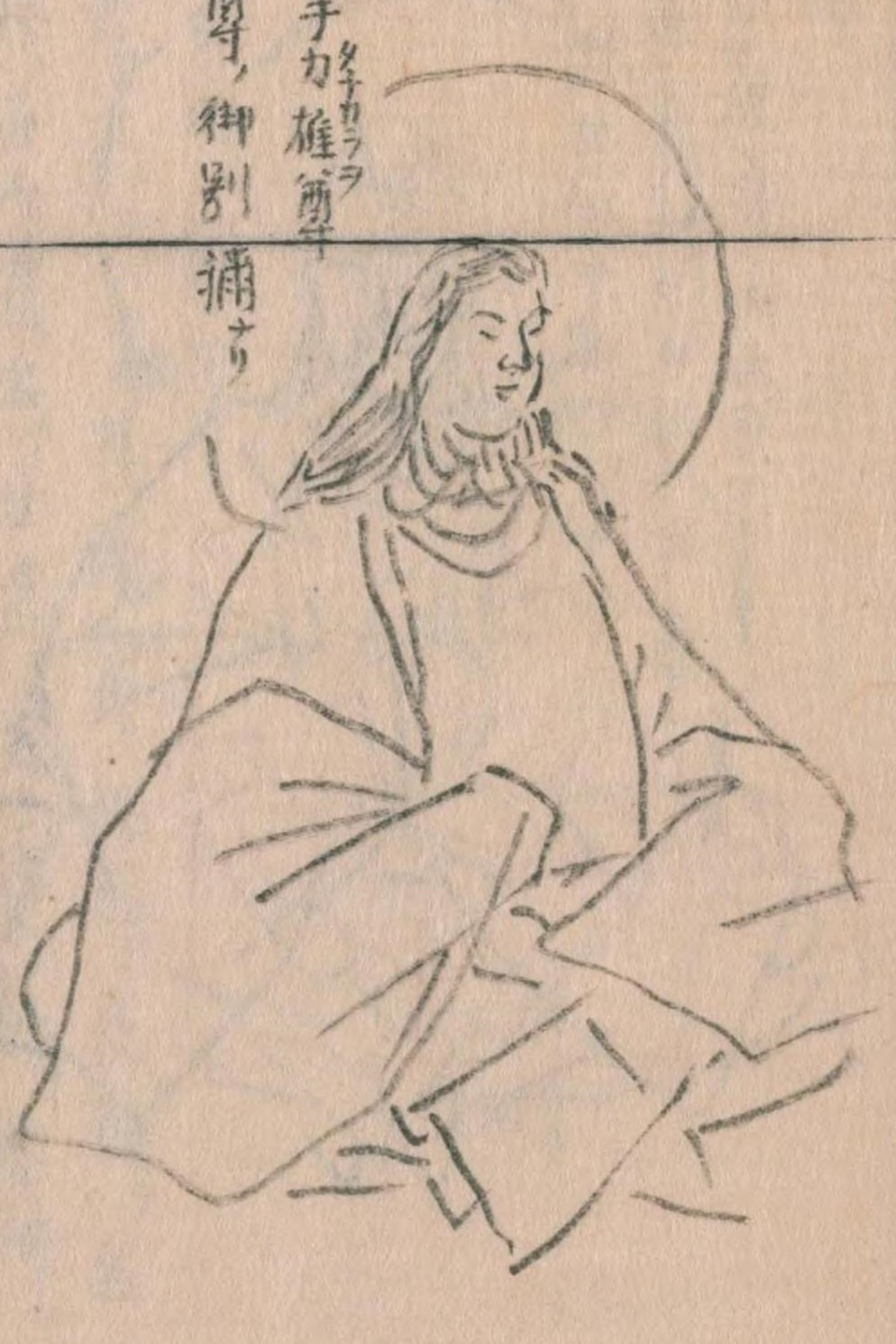

Genealogy
- Parents: Takamimusubi (father)
- Consort: Oshihomimi
- Children: Ninigi

Takuhadachijihime (栲幡千千姫命) is a deity (kami) in Japanese mythology said to be the goddess of textiles. According to the Kojiki, she is the daughter of Takamimusubi and was married to Oshihomimi, Amaterasu's eldest son, and also gave birth to Ninigi. Her exact genealogy varies in the different source texts but the themes of weaving and cloth remain constant.

In the Kojiki, she is also referred to by the name Yorozuhatahime (万幡豊秋津師比売命).

She is enshrined at Shiozawa Shrine in Fukushima Prefecture, Tsubaki Grand Shrine in Mie Prefecture, and Izuenashi Shrine in Osaka Prefecture.
