= Sugawara clan =

Japanese aristocratic family

Sugawara clan 菅原氏
- Mon: Umebachi
- Home province: Yamato Province
- Parent house: Haji clan
- Founder: Sugawara no Furuhito
- Founding year: 781
- Cadet branches: Takatsuji clan; Gojō clan; Higashibōjō clan; Karahashi clan; Kiyo'oka clan; Kuwahara clan

The Sugawara clan (菅原氏／菅家, Sugawara-uji/Kanke) was a Japanese aristocratic family claiming descent from Ame-no-hohi. Founded in 781, they served the Imperial Court as scholars and government officials since the clan's foundation until the early modern period when the clan divided into six branches.

In the mid-Heian period, Sugawara no Michizane served as Minister of the Right, but the clan weakened soon after being demoted from the upper court nobility, kugyō. They continued to serve as heads of the Imperial University, until Sugawara no Tamenaga became Associate Counselor, after which the clan reentered the upper court nobility. The clan later divided into six branches, the Takatsuji clan, Gojō clan, Higashibōjō clan, Karahashi clan, Kiyo'oka clan and Kuwahara clan, all of which stayed in upper court nobility.

== Origins ==
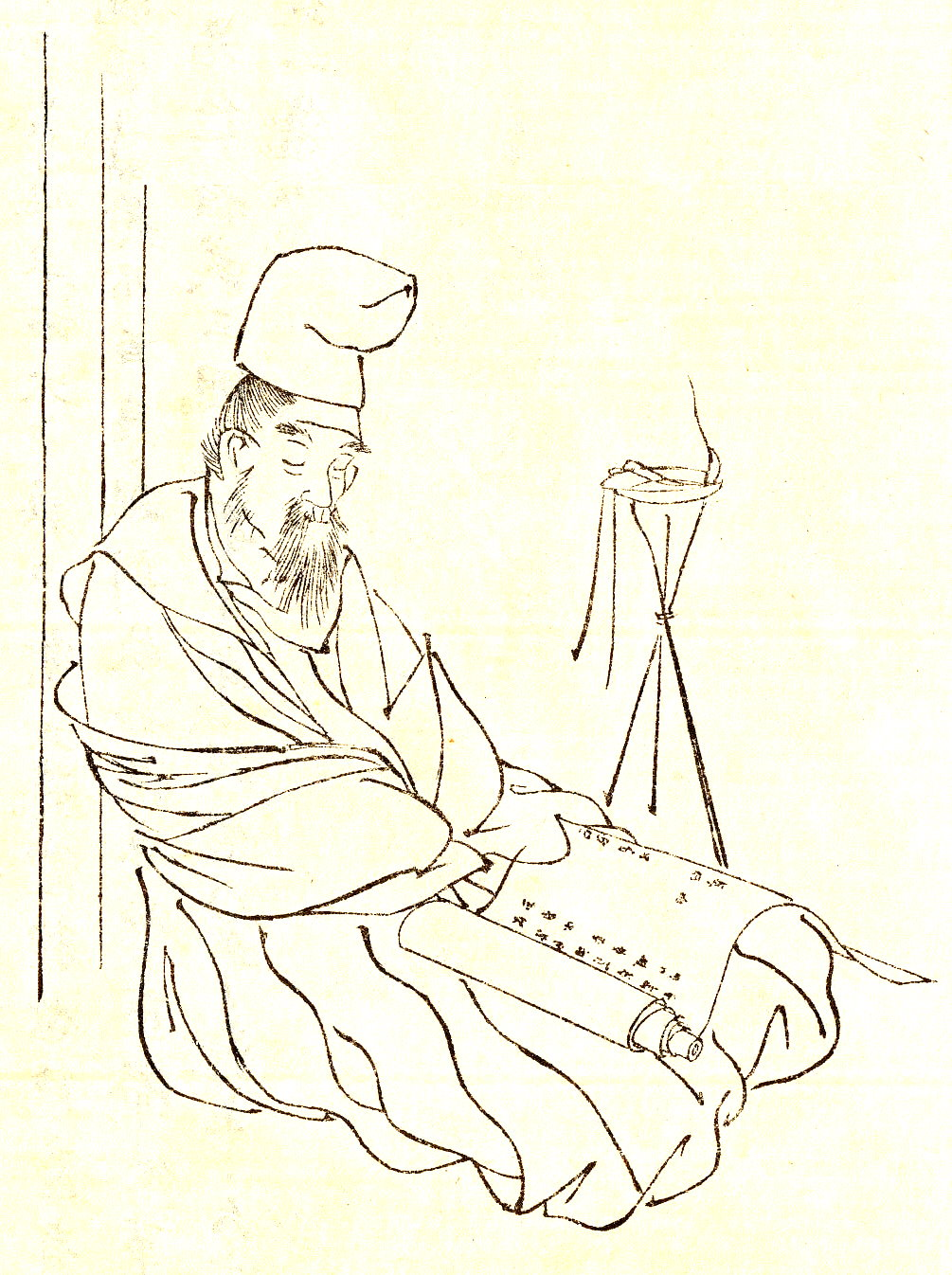
Sugawara no Furuhito, founder of the Sugawara clan

The clan ancestor, Nomi no Sukune, claimed descent from the male deity Ame-no-hohi. Sukune belonged to the Haji clan that was in charge of burial rites. In 781, Sugawara no Furuhito became the first person to take the surname Sugawara, and thus founded the Sugawara clan. The name was taken from the Sugawara village in Yamato Province.

== History ==
Sugawara no Furuhito studied Confucianism and became a personal scholar (jidoku) to Emperor Kanmu (r. 781–806). Furuhito's son Sugawara no Kiyotomo (770-842) held the court rank of Junior Third Rank, and his son Sugawara no Koreyoshi (812-880) was also of the same rank and served as Associate Counselor. Both Kiyotomo and Koreyoshi were scholars who served as chief experts on literature at the Imperial University. Kiyotomo also founded a private school called Kanke Rōka, educated many students, and established kidendō, the study of history, as the family business.

Sugawara no Michizane (845-903) was promoted to Junior Second Rank and Minister of the Right by Emperor Uda. However, in 901, he was demoted to Provisional Governor-General of Dazaifu (Dazai no Gon-no-Sochi), and died there. Michizane's sons were also disfavored, but in 906, his son and heir apparent Sugawara no Takami (876-913) was pardoned, and he was made head of the Imperial University. The descendants of Takami continued to serve as heads of the Imperial University as well as provincial governors. However, apart from Sugawara no Fumitoki (899-981), who was Junior Third Rank, and Sugawara no Sukemasa (925-1009), who was Junior Third Rank, Associate Counselor and Undersecretary of Dazaifu (Dazai no Daini), the clan members were not part of the upper court nobility, kugyō. Another notable member of the clan during this period was Sugawara no Takasue's daughter, the author of Sarashina Nikki.

In the early Kamakura period, Sugawara no Tamenaga (1158-1246) rose up to become Senior Second Rank, Associate Counselor and Head of the Ministry of the Treasury (Ōkura-kyō). Since then, the Sugawara clan belonged to the upper court nobility for generations. Additionally, because the Ōe clan, that had produced many chief experts on literature, had weakened, the Sugawara dominated the posts within the Faculty of Japanese and Chinese History.

In the early modern period, the clan divided into six branches: the Takatsuji clan, Gojō clan, Higashibōjō clan, Karahashi clan, Kiyo'oka clan and Kuwahara clan, all of which were dōjōke-ranking (hanke) kuge families. After the mid-Heian period, the majority of the Confucian scholars participating in the planning process of era names were descendants of the Sugawara clan.

In the medieval samurai society, the Karahashi clan was considered to be the main line of the Sugawara clan, and dominated the role of Sugawara clan leader known as Kitano no Chōja. However, after the Karahashi Arikazu murder incident, the clan weakened, and members of the Takatsuji clan, Higashibōjō clan were chosen for the role instead.

== Clans descended from Sugawara ==
- Hisamatsu clan; descended from the Sugawara clan.
- Mimasaka Kan clan; a samurai family from Mimasaka Province.
- Maeda clan; descended from the Harada clan, a branch of the Mimasaka Kan clan, or from a son born to Sugawara no Michizane in Kyushu.
- Minobe family; a Kōga-ryū family that claims descent from Sugawara no Atsushige.
- Yagyū clan; descended from the Sugawara clan.

== Notable members ==
- Sugawara no Furuhito
- Sugawara no Kiyotomo
- Sugawara no Koreyoshi
- Sugawara no Michizane
- Sugawara no Takasue's daughter

== See also ==
- Daigaku-ryō
- Takano no Niigasa (Niece of Nomi no Sukune)
