= Amaterasu =

Sun goddess in Shinto

- Goddess of the sun and the universe; the mythical ancestress of the Imperial House of Japan
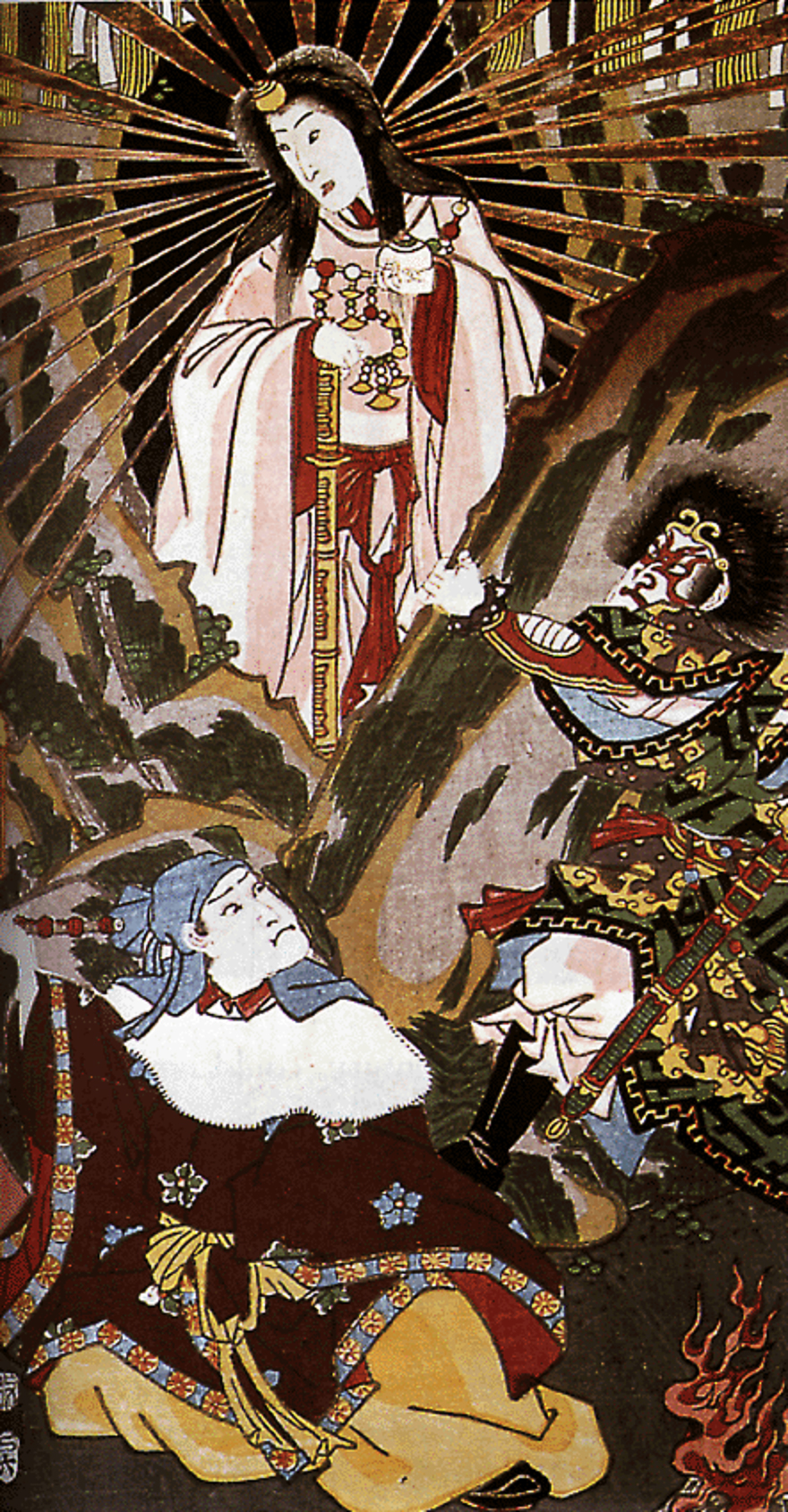
- Amaterasu emerging from the cave, Ama-no-Iwato, to which she once retreated (detail of woodblock print by Kunisada)
- Other names: Amaterasu-Ōmikami (天照大御神, 天照大神); Amaterasu Ōkami (天照大神); Amaterasu Sume(ra) Ōmikami (天照皇大神); Amaterashimasu Sume(ra) Ōmikami (天照坐皇大御神); Amaterasu Ōhirume no Mikoto (天照大日孁尊); Ōhirume no Muchi no Kami (大日孁貴神); Ōhirume no Mikoto (大日孁尊); Hi no Kami (日神); Tsukisakaki Izu no Mitama Amazakaru Mukatsuhime no Mikoto (撞賢木厳之御魂天疎向津媛命); Tenshō Kōtaijin (天照皇大神); Tenshō Daijin (天照大神)
- Major cult centre: Ise Shrine
- Abode: Takamagahara
- Planet: Sun
- Artifacts: Yata no Kagami and Yasakani no Magatama
- Animals: Snake and dragon
- Texts: Kojiki, Nihon Shoki, Sendai Kuji Hongi

Genealogy
- Parents: Izanagi (Kojiki); Izanagi and Izanami (Nihon Shoki)
- Siblings: Tsukuyomi; Susanoo; (and others)
- Consort: Unnamed sun god (One Myth); Tsukuyomi (some myths)
- Children: Ame-no-Oshihomimi; Ame no Hohi; Amatsuhikone; Ikutsuhikone; Kumanokusubi

Amaterasu Ōmikami (天照大（御）神; Japanese pronunciation: [aꜜmateɾasɯ oːmʲiꜜkamʲi]), often called Amaterasu for short, also known as Amateru Kami (天照神) and Ōhirume no Muchi (大日孁貴), is the goddess of the sun in Japanese mythology. Often considered the chief deity (kami) of the Shinto pantheon, she is also portrayed in Japan's earliest literary texts, the Kojiki (c. 712 CE) and the Nihon Shoki (720 CE), as the ruler (or one of the rulers) of the heavenly realm Takamagahara and as the mythical ancestress of the Imperial House of Japan via her grandson Ninigi. Along with two of her siblings (the moon deity Tsukuyomi and the impetuous storm-god Susanoo) she ranks as one of the "Three Precious Children" (三貴子, mihashira no uzu no miko / sankishi), the three most important offspring of the creator god Izanagi.

Amaterasu's chief place of worship, the Grand Shrine of Ise in Ise, Mie Prefecture, is one of Shinto's holiest sites and a major pilgrimage center and tourist spot. As with other Shinto kami, she is also enshrined in a number of Shinto shrines throughout Japan.

== Name ==
The goddess is referred to as Amaterasu Ōmikami (天照大御神 / 天照大神; historical orthography: あまてらすおほみかみ, Amaterasu Ohomikami; Old Japanese: Amaterasu Opomi_{1}kami_{2}) in the Kojiki, while the Nihon Shoki gives the following variant names:

- Ōhirume-no-Muchi (大日孁貴; Man'yōgana: 於保比屢咩能武智; hist. orthography: おほひるめのむち, Ohohirume-no-Muchi; Old Japanese: Opopi_{1}rume_{1}-no_{2}-Muti)
- Amaterasu Ō(mi)kami (天照大神; hist. orthography: あまてらすおほ(み)かみ, Amaterasu Oho(mi)kami)
- Amaterasu Ōhirume no Mikoto (天照大日孁尊)
- Hi-no-Kami (日神; OJ: Pi_{1}-no-Kami_{2})

Amaterasu is thought to derive from the verb amateru ('to illuminate / shine in the sky'; from ama 'sky, heaven' and teru 'to shine') combined with the honorific auxiliary verb -su, while Ōmikami means 'great august deity' (ō 'great' + honorific prefix mi- (Note: Rendered as "august" by Basil Hall Chamberlain in his translation of the Kojiki.) + kami). Notably, Amaterasu in Amaterasu Ōmikami is not technically a name the same way Susanoo in Susa no O no Mikoto or Ōkuninushi in Ōkuninushi no Kami is. Amaterasu is an attributive verb form that modifies the noun after it, ōmikami. This epithet is therefore, much more semantically transparent than most names recorded in the Kojiki and Nihon Shoki, in that it means exactly what it means, without allusion, inference or etymological opacity, literally 'The Great August Goddess Who Shines in Heaven'. This usage is analogous to the use of relative clauses in English, only different in that Japanese clauses are placed in front of the noun they modify. This is further exemplified by (1) an alternative epithet, Amateru Kami (天照神, 'The Goddess Who Shines in Heaven'), which is a plain, non-honorific version of Amaterasu Ōmikami, (2) alternative forms of the verb amaterasu used elsewhere, for example its continuative form amaterashi (天照之) in the Nihon Sandai Jitsuroku, and (3) similar uses of attributive verb forms in certain epithets, such as Emperor Jimmu's Hatsu Kunishirasu Sumeramikoto (始馭天下之天皇, 'His Majesty Who First Rules the Land'). There are, still, certain verb forms that are treated as proper names, such as the terminal negative fukiaezu in 'Ugayafukiaezu no Mikoto' (鸕鷀草葺不合尊, 'His Augustness, Incompletely-Thatched-with-Cormorant-Feathers').

Her other name, Ōhirume, is usually understood as meaning 'great woman of the sun / daytime' (cf. hiru 'day(time), noon', from hi 'sun, day' + me 'woman, lady'), though alternative etymologies such as 'great spirit woman' (taking hi to mean 'spirit') or 'wife of the sun' (suggested by Orikuchi Shinobu, who put forward the theory that Amaterasu was originally conceived of as the consort or priestess of a male solar deity) had been proposed. A possible connection with the name Hiruko (the child rejected by the gods Izanagi and Izanami and one of Amaterasu's siblings) has also been suggested. To this name is appended the honorific muchi, which is also seen in a few other theonyms such as 'Ō(a)namuchi' or 'Michinushi-no-Muchi' (an epithet of the three Munakata goddesses).

As the ancestress of the imperial line, the epithet Sume(ra)-Ō(mi)kami (皇大神, lit. 'great imperial deity'; also read as Kōtaijin) is also applied to Amaterasu in names such as Amaterasu Sume(ra) Ō(mi)kami (天照皇大神, also read as 'Tenshō Kōtaijin') and 'Amaterashimasu-Sume(ra)-Ōmikami' (天照坐皇大御神).

During the medieval and early modern periods, the deity was also referred to as 'Tenshō Daijin' (the on'yomi of 天照大神) or 'Amateru Ongami' (an alternate reading of the same).

The name Amaterasu Ōmikami has been translated into English in different ways. While a number of authors such as Donald Philippi rendered it as 'heaven-illuminating great deity', Basil Hall Chamberlain argued (citing the authority of Motoori Norinaga) that it is more accurately understood to mean 'shining in heaven' (because the auxiliary su is merely honorific, not causative, such interpretation as 'to make heaven shine' would miss the mark), and accordingly translated it as 'Heaven-Shining-Great-August-Deity'. Gustav Heldt's 2014 translation of the Kojiki, meanwhile, renders it as "the great and mighty spirit Heaven Shining."

== Mythology ==
=== In classical mythology ===
==== Birth ====
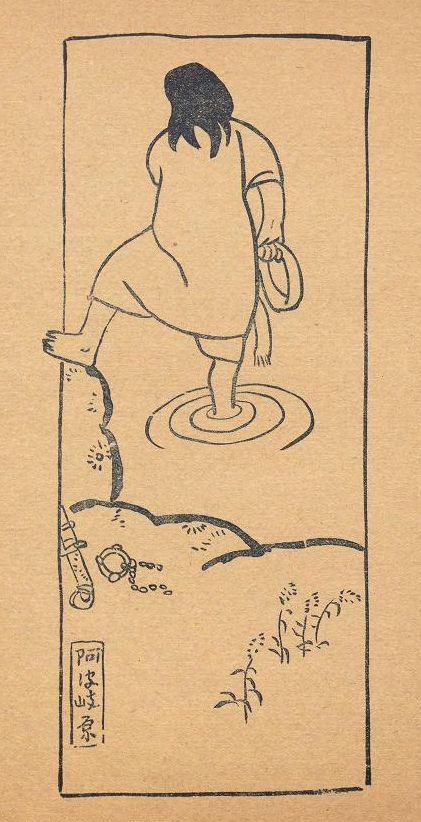
Izanagi purifying himself (misogi) by immersing in the Tachibana River (Natori Shunsen)

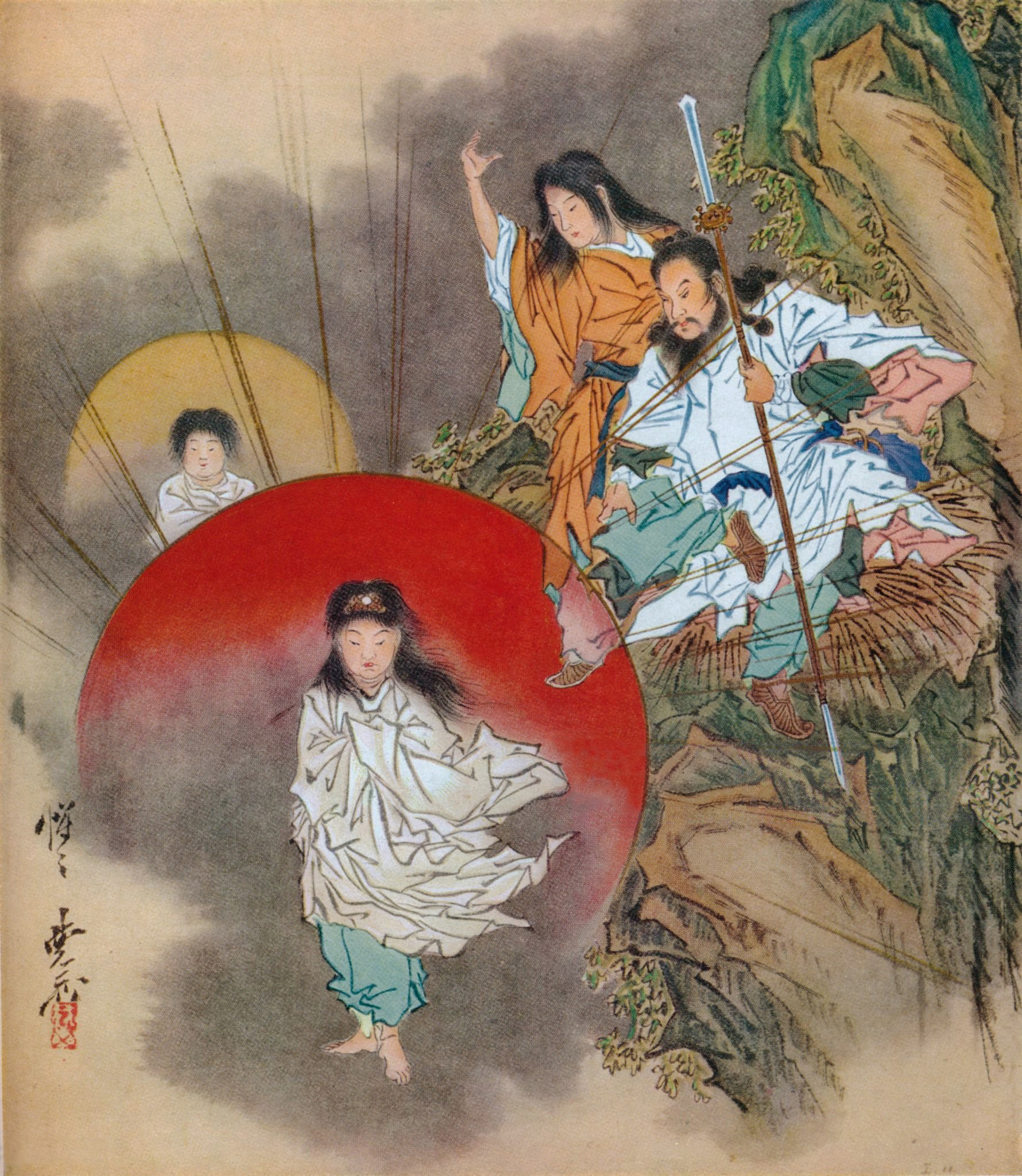
Installation of the Sun Goddess (Amaterasu)

Both the Kojiki (c. 712 CE) and the Nihon Shoki (720 CE) agree in their description of Amaterasu as the daughter of the god Izanagi and the elder sister of Tsukuyomi, the deity of the moon, and Susanoo, the god of storms and seas. The circumstances surrounding the birth of these three deities, known as the "Three Precious Children" (三貴子, mihashira no uzu no miko or sankishi), however, vary between sources:

- In the Kojiki, Amaterasu, Tsukuyomi and Susanoo were born when Izanagi went to "[the plain of] Awagihara by the river-mouth of Tachibana in Himuka in [the island of] Tsukushi" (Note: 'Awagihara' or 'Awakihara' (Old Japanese: Apaki_{1}para) is a toponym meaning "a plain covered with awagi shrubs". Its actual location is considered uncertain, although a pond near Eda Shrine in modern-day Awakigahara-chō, Miyazaki, Miyazaki Prefecture (corresponding to the historical Himuka / Hyūga Province) is identified in local lore as the exact spot where Izanagi purified himself.) and bathed (misogi) in the river to purify himself after visiting Yomi, the underworld, in a failed attempt to rescue his deceased wife, Izanami. Amaterasu was born when Izanagi washed his left eye, Tsukuyomi was born when he washed his right eye, and Susanoo was born when he washed his nose. Izanagi then appoints Amaterasu to rule Takamagahara (the "Plain of High Heaven"), Tsukuyomi the night, and Susanoo the seas.
- The main narrative of the Nihon Shoki has Izanagi and Izanami procreating after creating the Japanese archipelago; to them were born (in the following order) Ōhirume-no-Muchi (Amaterasu), Tsukuyomi, the 'leech-child' Hiruko, and Susanoo:

After this Izanagi no Mikoto and Izanami no Mikoto consulted together, saying:—"We have now produced the Great-eight-island country, with the mountains, rivers, herbs, and trees. Why should we not produce someone who shall be lord of the universe?" They then together produced the Sun-Goddess, who was called Oho-hiru-me no muchi. [...]
The resplendent lustre of this child shone throughout all the six quarters. Therefore the two Deities rejoiced, saying:—"We have had many children, but none of them have been equal to this wondrous infant. She ought not to be kept long in this land, but we ought of our own accord to send her at once to Heaven, and entrust to her the affairs of Heaven."
At this time Heaven and Earth were still not far separated, and therefore they sent her up to Heaven by the ladder of Heaven.

- A variant legend recorded in the Shoki has Izanagi begetting Ōhirume (Amaterasu) by holding a bronze mirror in his left hand, Tsukuyomi by holding another mirror in his right hand, and Susanoo by turning his head and looking sideways.
- A third variant in the Shoki has Izanagi and Izanami begetting the sun, the moon, Hiruko, and Susanoo, as in the main narrative. Their final child, the fire god Kagutsuchi, caused Izanami's death (as in the Kojiki).
- A fourth variant relates a similar story to that found in the Kojiki, wherein the three gods are born when Izanagi washed himself in the river of Tachibana after going to Yomi.

==== Amaterasu and Tsukuyomi ====
One of the variant legends in the Shoki relates that Amaterasu ordered her sibling Tsukuyomi to go down to the terrestrial world (Ashihara-no-Nakatsukuni, the "Central Land of Reed-Plains") and visit the goddess Ukemochi. When Ukemochi vomited foodstuffs out of her mouth and presented them to Tsukuyomi at a banquet, a disgusted and offended Tsukuyomi slew her and went back to Takamagahara. This act upset Amaterasu, causing her to split away from Tsukuyomi, thus separating night from day.

Amaterasu then sent another god, Ame-no-Kumahito (天熊人), who found various food-crops and animals emerging from Ukemochi's corpse.

On the crown of her head there had been produced the ox and the horse; on the top of her forehead there had been produced millet; over her eyebrows there had been produced the silkworm; within her eyes there had been produced panic; in her belly there had been produced rice; in her genitals there had been produced wheat, large beans and small beans.

Amaterasu had the grains collected and sown for humanity's use and, putting the silkworms in her mouth, reeled thread from them. From this began agriculture and sericulture.

This account is not found in the Kojiki, where a similar story is instead told of Susanoo and the goddess Ōgetsuhime.

==== Amaterasu and Susanoo ====
When Susanoo, the youngest of the three divine siblings, was expelled by his father Izanagi for his troublesome nature and incessant wailing on account of missing his deceased mother Izanami, he first went up to Takamagahara to say farewell to Amaterasu. A suspicious Amaterasu went out to meet him dressed in male clothing and clad in armor, at which Susanoo proposed a trial by pledge (ukehi) to prove his sincerity. In the ritual, the two gods each chewed and spat out an object carried by the other (in some variants, an item they each possessed). Five (or six) gods and three goddesses were born as a result; Amaterasu adopted the males as her sons and gave the females – later known as the three Munakata goddesses – to Susanoo.

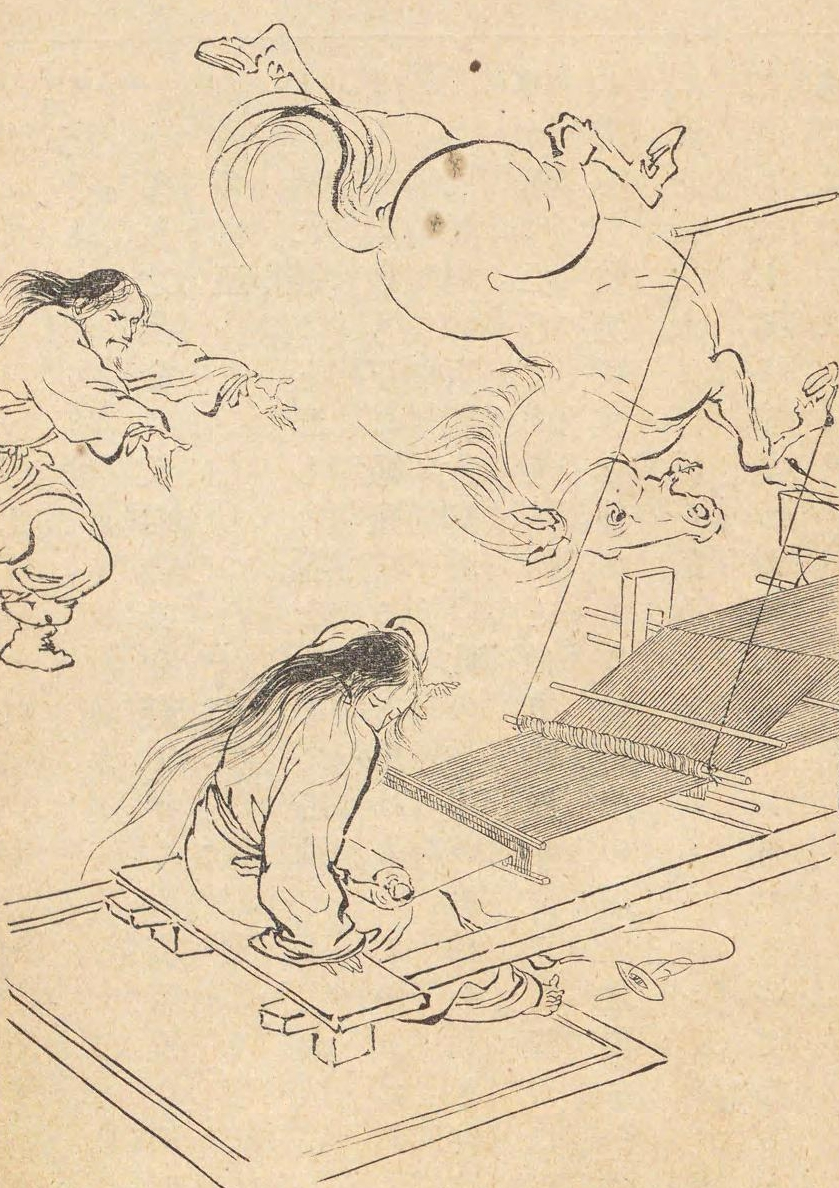
Susanoo throwing the heavenly horse into Amaterasu's loom

Susanoo, declaring that he had won the trial as he had produced deities of the required gender, (Note: Female in the Kojiki, male in the Shoki.) then "raged with victory" and proceeded to wreak havoc by destroying his sister's rice fields and defecating in her palace. While Amaterasu tolerated Susanoo's behavior at first, his "misdeeds did not cease, but became even more flagrant" until one day, he bore a hole in the rooftop of Amaterasu's weaving hall and hurled the "heavenly piebald horse" (天斑駒, ame no fuchikoma), which he had flayed alive, into it. One of Amaterasu's weaving maidens was alarmed and struck her genitals against a weaving shuttle, killing her. In response, a furious Amaterasu shut herself inside the Ame-no-Iwayato (天岩屋戸, 'Heavenly Rock-Cave Door', also known as Ama-no-Iwato), plunging heaven and earth into total darkness.

The main account in the Shoki has Amaterasu wounding herself with the shuttle when Susanoo threw the flayed horse in her weaving hall, while a variant account identifies the goddess who was killed during this incident as Wakahirume-no-Mikoto (稚日女尊, lit. 'young woman of the sun / day(time)').

Whereas the above accounts identify Susanoo's flaying of the horse as the immediate cause for Amaterasu hiding herself, yet another variant in the Shoki instead portrays it to be Susanoo defecating in her seat:

In one writing it is said:—"The august Sun Goddess took an enclosed rice-field and made it her Imperial rice-field. Now Sosa no wo no Mikoto, in spring, filled up the channels and broke down the divisions, and in autumn, when the grain was formed, he forthwith stretched round them division ropes. Again when the Sun-Goddess was in her Weaving-Hall, he flayed alive a piebald colt and flung it into the Hall. In all these various matters his conduct was rude in the highest degree. Nevertheless, the Sun-Goddess, out of her friendship for him, was not indignant or resentful, but took everything calmly and with forbearance.
When the time came for the Sun-Goddess to celebrate the feast of first-fruits, Sosa no wo no Mikoto secretly voided excrement under her august seat in the New Palace. The Sun-Goddess, not knowing this, went straight there and took her seat. Accordingly the Sun-Goddess drew herself up, and was sickened. She therefore was enraged, and straightway took up her abode in the Rock-cave of Heaven, and fastened its Rock-door.

==== The Heavenly Rock Cave ====
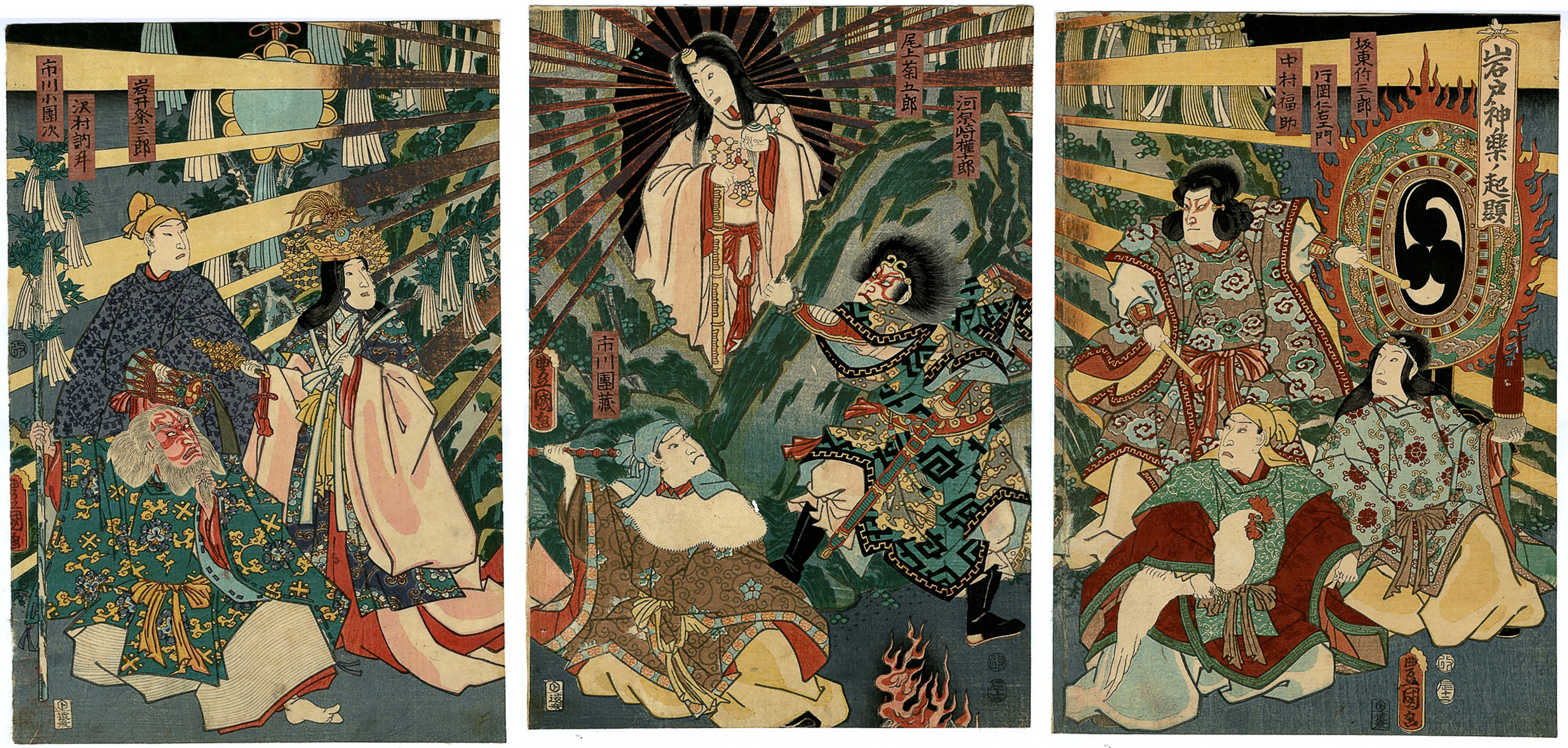
A triptych depicting Amaterasu emerging from the Heavenly Rock Cave, bringing sunlight back to the world (Origin of Iwato Kagura Dance Amaterasu by Utagawa Kunisada, 1856)

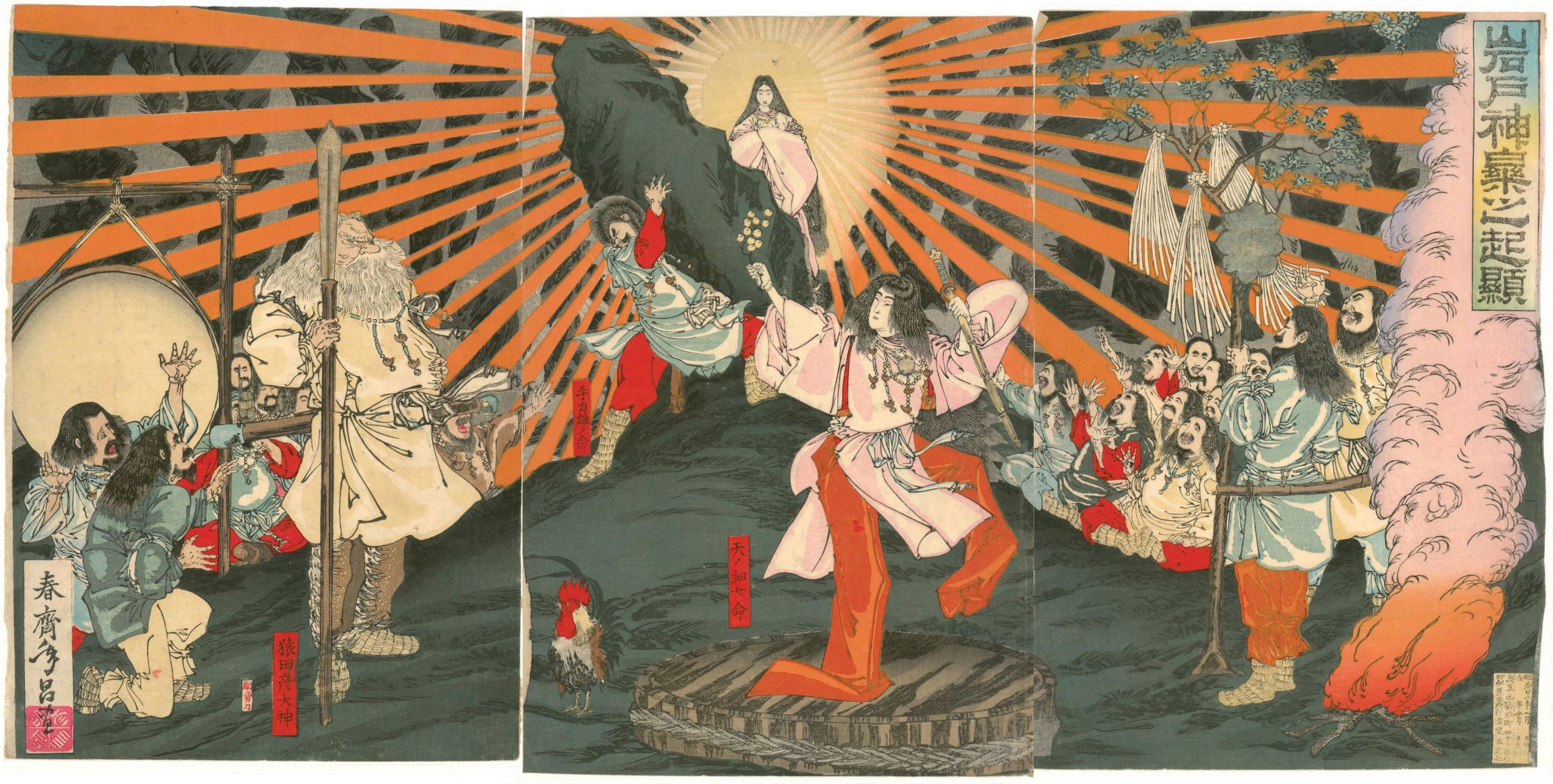
Origin of Music and Dance at the Rock Door by Shunsai Toshimasa, 1887

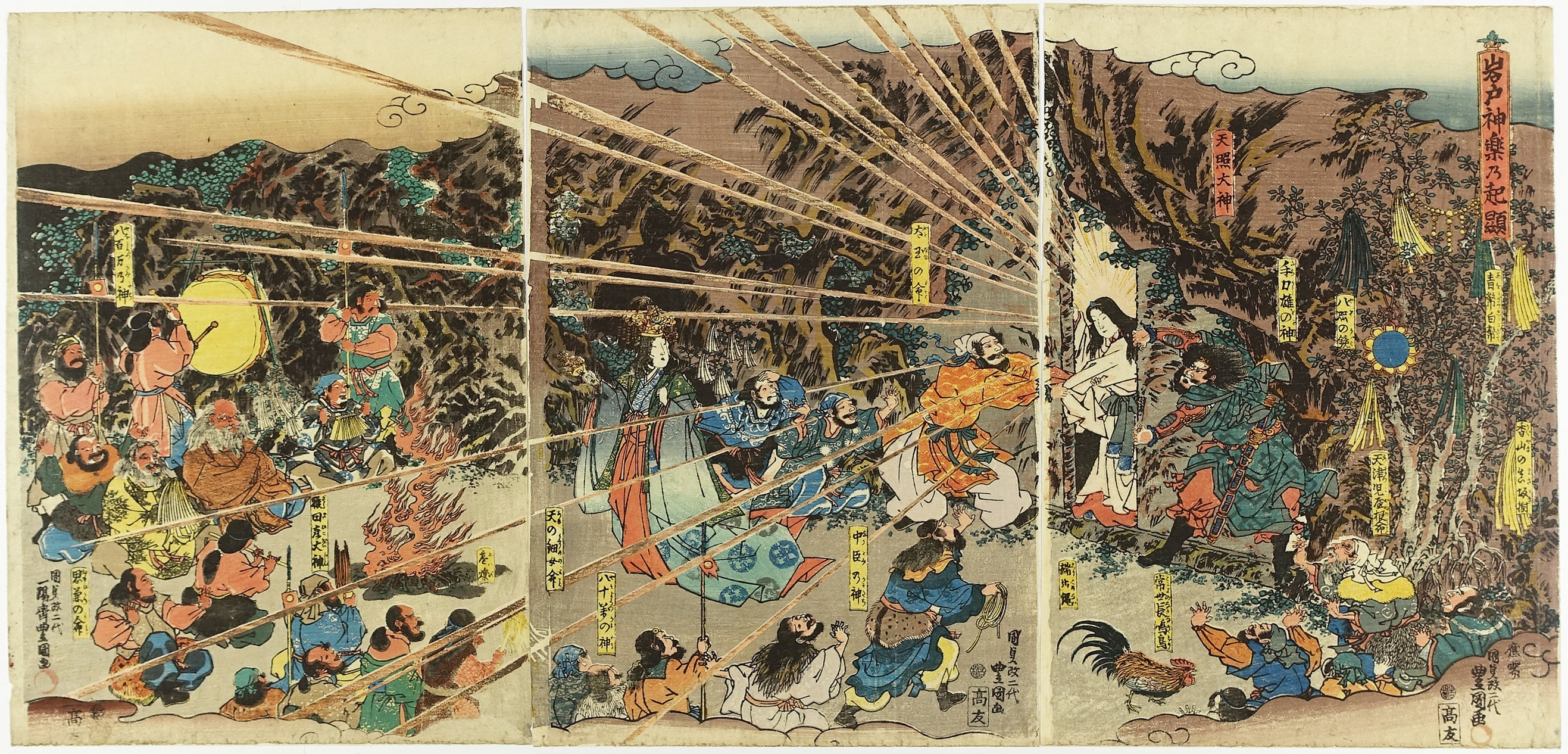
The Origin of Iwato Kagura by Utagawa Kunisada, completed circa 1844

After Amaterasu hid herself in the cave, the gods, led by Omoikane, the god of wisdom, conceived a plan to lure her out:

[The gods] gathered together the long-crying birds of Tokoyo and caused them to cry. (...) They uprooted by the very roots the flourishing ma-sakaki trees of the mountain Ame-no-Kaguyama; to the upper branches they affixed long strings of myriad magatama beads; in the middle branches they hung a large-dimensioned mirror; in the lower branches they suspended white nikite cloth and blue nikite cloth.

These various objects were held in his hands by Futotama-no-Mikoto as solemn offerings, and Ame-no-Koyane-no-Mikoto intoned a solemn liturgy.
Ame-no-Tajikarao-no-Kami stood concealed beside the door, while Ame-no-Uzume-no-Mikoto bound up her sleeves with a cord of heavenly hikage vine, tied around her head a head-band of the heavenly masaki vine, bound together bundles of sasa leaves to hold in her hands, and overturning a bucket before the heavenly rock-cave door, stamped resoundingly upon it. Then she became divinely possessed, exposed her breasts, and pushed her skirt-band down to her genitals.

Then Takamanohara shook as the eight-hundred myriad deities laughed at once.

Inside the cave, Amaterasu is surprised that the gods should show such mirth in her absence. Ame-no-Uzume answered that they were celebrating because another god greater than her had appeared. Curious, Amaterasu slid the boulder blocking the cave's entrance and peeked out, at which Ame-no-Koyane and Futodama brought out the mirror (the Yata-no-Kagami) and held it before her. As Amaterasu, struck by her own reflection (apparently thinking it to be the other deity Ame-no-Uzume spoke of), approached the mirror, Ame-no-Tajikarao took her hand and pulled her out of the cave, which was then immediately sealed with a straw rope, preventing her from going back inside. Thus was light restored to the world.

As punishment for his unruly conduct, Susanoo was then driven out of Takamagahara by the other gods. Going down to earth, he arrived at the land of Izumo, where he killed the monstrous serpent Yamata no Orochi to rescue the goddess Kushinadahime, whom he eventually married. From the serpent's carcass Susanoo found the sword Ame-no-Murakumo-no-Tsurugi (天叢雲剣, 'Sword of the Gathering Clouds of Heaven'), also known as Kusanagi-no-Tsurugi (草薙剣 'Grass-Cutting Sword'), which he presented to Amaterasu as a reconciliatory gift.

==== The subjugation of Ashihara-no-Nakatsukuni ====
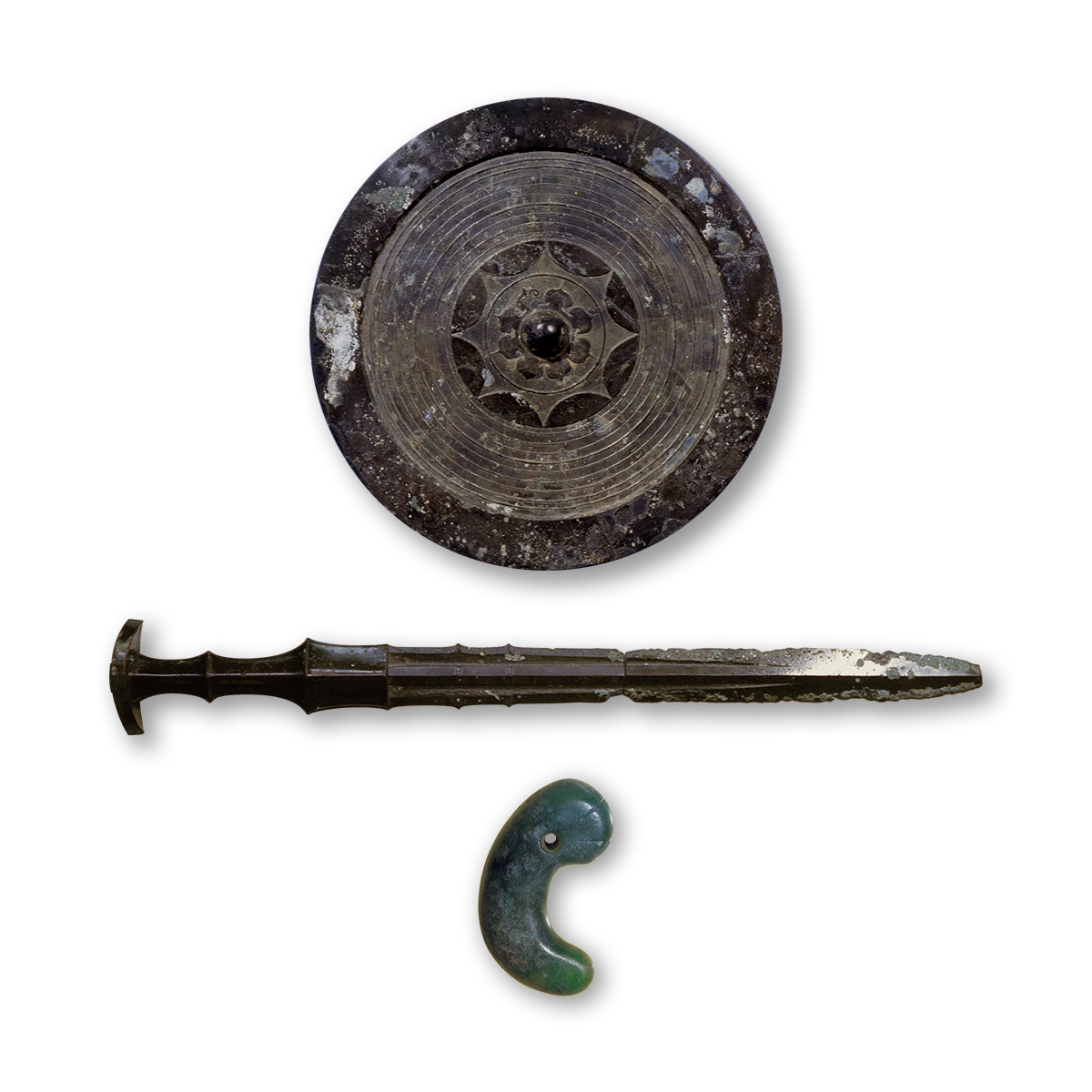
Artist's impression of the three Imperial Regalia of Japan

After a time, Amaterasu and the primordial deity Takamimusubi (also known as Takagi-no-Kami) declared that Ashihara-no-Nakatsukuni, which was then being ruled over by Ōkuninushi (also known as Ō(a)namuchi), the descendant (Kojiki) or the son (Shoki) of Susanoo, should be pacified and put under the jurisdiction of their progeny, claiming it to be teeming with "numerous deities which shone with a lustre like that of fireflies, and evil deities which buzzed like flies". Amaterasu ordered Ame-no-Oshihomimi, the firstborn of the five male children born during her contest with Susanoo, to go down to earth and establish his rule over it. However, after inspecting the land below, he deemed it to be in an uproar and refused to go any further. At the advice of Omoikane and the other deities, Amaterasu then dispatched another of her five sons, Ame no Hohi. Upon arriving, however, Ame no Hohi began to curry favor with Ōkuninushi and did not send back any report for three years. The heavenly deities then sent a third messenger, Ame-no-Wakahiko, who also ended up siding with Ōkuninushi and marrying his daughter Shitateruhime. After eight years, a female pheasant was sent to question Ame-no-Wakahiko, who killed it with his bow and arrow. The blood-stained arrow flew straight up to Takamagahara at the feet of Amaterasu and Takamimusubi, who then threw it back to earth with a curse, killing Ame-no-Wakahiko in his sleep.

The preceding messengers having thus failed to complete their task, the heavenly gods finally sent the warrior deities Futsunushi and Takemikazuchi (Note: So the Nihon Shoki, the Kogo Shūi, and the Sendai Kuji Hongi. In the Kojiki (where Futsunushi is not mentioned), the envoys sent by the heavenly gods are Takemikazuchi and the bird-boat deity Ame-no-Torifune. In the Izumo no Kuni no Miyatsuko no Kanʼyogoto ("Congratulatory Words of the Kuni no Miyatsuko of Izumo" – a norito recited by the governor of Izumo Province before the imperial court during his appointment), Futsunushi's companion is Ame-no-Oshihomimi's son Ame no Hinadori.) to remonstrate with Ōkuninushi. At the advice of his son Kotoshironushi, Ōkuninushi agreed to abdicate and left the physical realm to govern the unseen spirit world, which was given to him in exchange. The two gods then went around Ashihara-no-Nakatsukuni, killing those who resisted them and rewarding those who rendered submission, before going back to heaven.

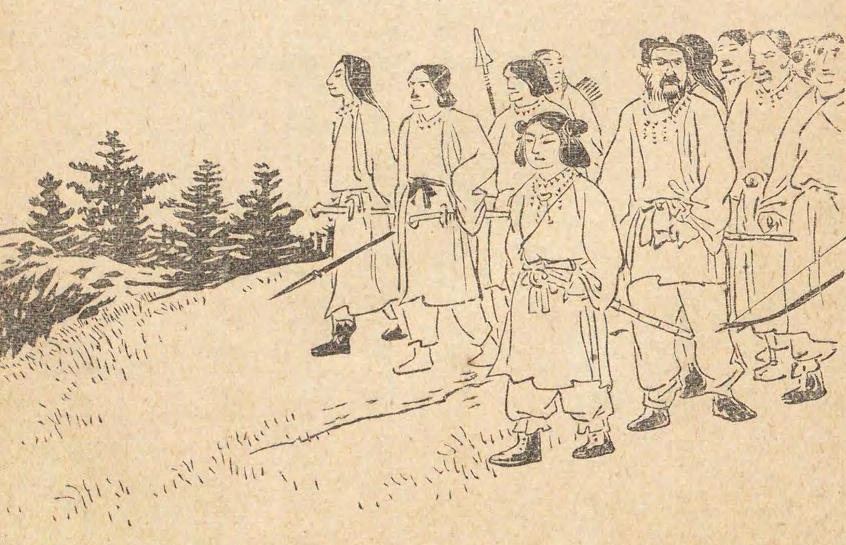
Ninigi and his retinue at Mount Takachiho

With the earth now pacified, Amaterasu and Takamimusubi again commanded Ame-no-Oshihomimi to descend and rule it. He, however, again demurred and suggested that his son Ninigi be sent instead. Amaterasu thus bequeathed to Ninigi, the sword Susanoo gave her, along with the two items used to lure her out of the Ame-no-Iwayato: the mirror Yata-no-Kagami and the jewel Yasakani no Magatama. With a number of gods serving as his retinue, Ninigi came down from heaven to Mount Takachiho in the land of Himuka and built his palace there. Ninigi became the ancestor of the emperors of Japan, while the mirror, jewel, and sword he brought with him became the three sacred treasures of the imperial house. Five of the gods who accompanied him in his descent – Ame-no-Koyane, Futodama, Ame-no-Uzume, Ishikoridome (the maker of the mirror), and Tamanoya (the maker of the jewel) – meanwhile became the ancestors of the clans involved in court ceremonial such as the Nakatomi and the Inbe.

==== Emperor Jimmu and the Yatagarasu ====
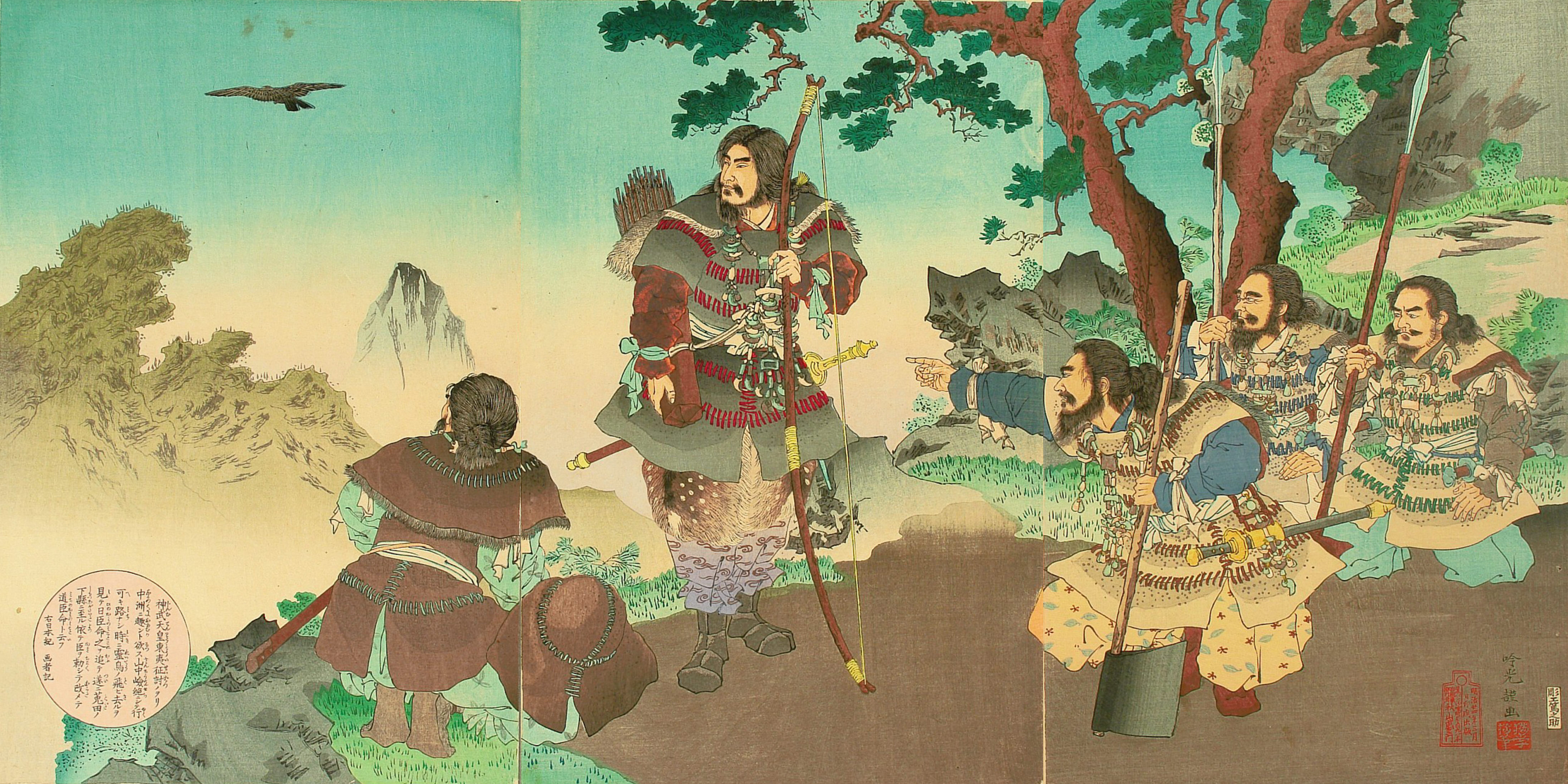
Yatagarasu the sun crow guiding Emperor Jimmu and his men towards the plain of Yamato

Many years later, Ninigi's great-grandson, Kamuyamato-Iwarebiko (later known as Emperor Jimmu), decided to leave Himuka in search of a new home with his elder brother Itsuse. Migrating eastward, they encountered various gods and local tribes who either submitted to them or resisted them. After Itsuse died of wounds sustained during a battle against a chieftain named Nagasunehiko, Iwarebiko retreated and went to Kumano, located on the southern part of the Kii Peninsula. While there, he and his army were enchanted by a god in the shape of a giant bear and fell into a deep sleep. At that moment, a local named Takakuraji had a dream in which Amaterasu and Takamimusubi commanded the god Takemikazuchi to help Iwarebiko. Takemikazuchi then dropped his sword, Futsu-no-Mitama, into Takakuraji's storehouse, ordering him to give it to Iwarebiko. Upon waking up and discovering the sword inside the storehouse, Takakuraji went to where Iwarebiko was and presented it to him. The magic power of the Futsu-no-Mitama immediately exterminated the evil gods of the region and roused Iwarebiko and his men from their slumber.

Continuing their journey, the army soon found themselves stranded in the mountains. Takamimusubi (so the Kojiki) or Amaterasu (Shoki) then told Iwarebiko in a dream that the giant crow Yatagarasu would be sent to guide them in their way. Soon enough, the bird appeared and led Iwarebiko and his men to safety. At length, Iwarebiko arrived at the land of Yamato (modern Nara Prefecture) and defeated Nagasunehiko, thereby avenging his brother Itsuse. He then established his palace-capital at Kashihara and ruled therein.

==== Enshrinement in Ise ====
Hibara Shrine at the foot of Mount Miwa in Sakurai, Nara Prefecture. The shrine is identified as the place where the Yata-no-Kagami and the Kusanagi-no-Tsurugi were first enshrined after they were removed from the imperial palace.

An anecdote concerning Emperor Sujin relates that Amaterasu (via the Yata-no-Kagami and the Kusanagi sword) and Yamato-no-Okunitama, the tutelary deity of Yamato, were originally worshipped in the great hall of the imperial palace. When a series of plagues broke out during Sujin's reign, he "dreaded [...] the power of these Gods, and did not feel secure in their dwelling together." He thus entrusted the mirror and the sword to his daughter Toyosukiirihime, who brought them to the village of Kasanuhi, and she would become the first Saiō. and delegated the worship of Yamato-no-Okunitama to another daughter, Nunakiirihime. When the pestilence showed no sign of abating, he then performed divination, which revealed the plague to have been caused by Ōmononushi, the god of Mount Miwa. When the god was offered proper worship as per his demands, the epidemic ceased.

During the reign of Sujin's son and successor, Emperor Suinin, custody of the sacred treasures were transferred from Toyosukiirihime to Suinin's daughter Yamatohime, who took them first to "Sasahata in Uda" to the east of Miwa. Heading north to Ōmi, she then eastwards to Mino and proceeded south to Ise, where she received a revelation from Amaterasu:

Now Ama-terasu no Oho-kami instructed Yamato-hime no Mikoto, saying:—"The province of Ise, of the divine wind, is the land whither repair the waves from the eternal world, the successive waves. It is a secluded and pleasant land. In this land I wish to dwell." In compliance, therefore, with the instruction of the Great Goddess, a shrine was erected to her in the province of Ise. Accordingly an Abstinence Palace was built at Kaha-kami in Isuzu. This was called the palace of Iso. It was there that Ama-terasu no Oho-kami first descended from Heaven.

This account serves as the origin myth of the Grand Shrine of Ise, Amaterasu's chief place of worship.

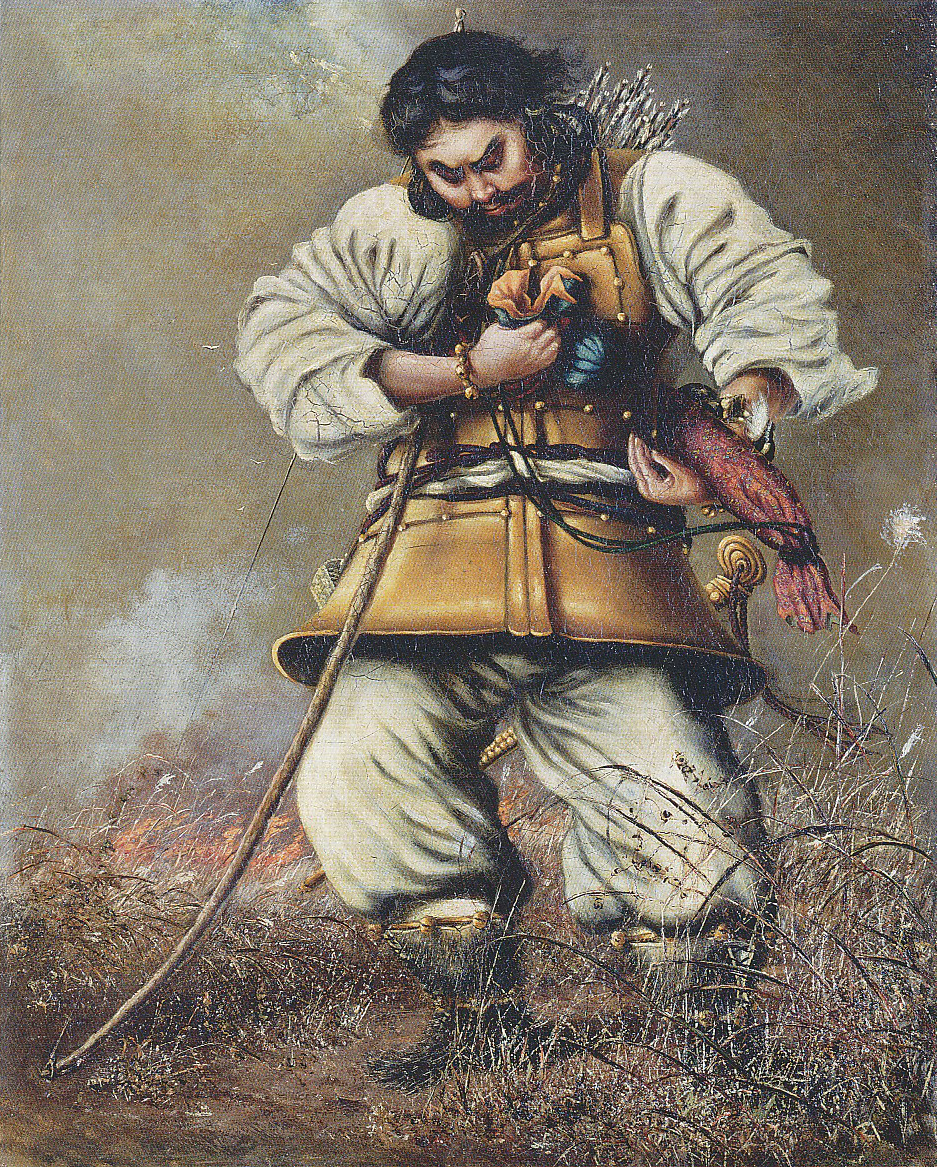
Yamato Takeru

Later, when Suinin's grandson Prince Ousu (also known as Yamato Takeru) went to Ise to visit his aunt Yamatohime before going to conquer and pacify the eastern regions on the command of his father, Emperor Keikō, he was given the divine sword to protect him in times of peril. It eventually came in handy when Yamato Takeru was lured onto an open grassland by a treacherous chieftain, who then set fire to the grass to entrap him. Desperate, Yamato Takeru used the sword to cut the grass around him (a variant in the Shoki has the sword miraculously mow the grass of its own accord) and lit a counter-fire to keep the fire away. This incident explains the sword's name ("Grass Cutter"). On his way home from the east, Yamato Takeru – apparently blinded by hubris – left the Kusanagi in the care of his second wife, Miyazuhime of Owari, and went to confront the god of Mount Ibuki on his own. Without the sword's protection, he fell prey to the god's enchantment and became ill and died afterwards. Thus the Kusanagi stayed in Owari, where it was enshrined in the shrine of Atsuta.

==== Empress Jingū and Amaterasu's aramitama ====
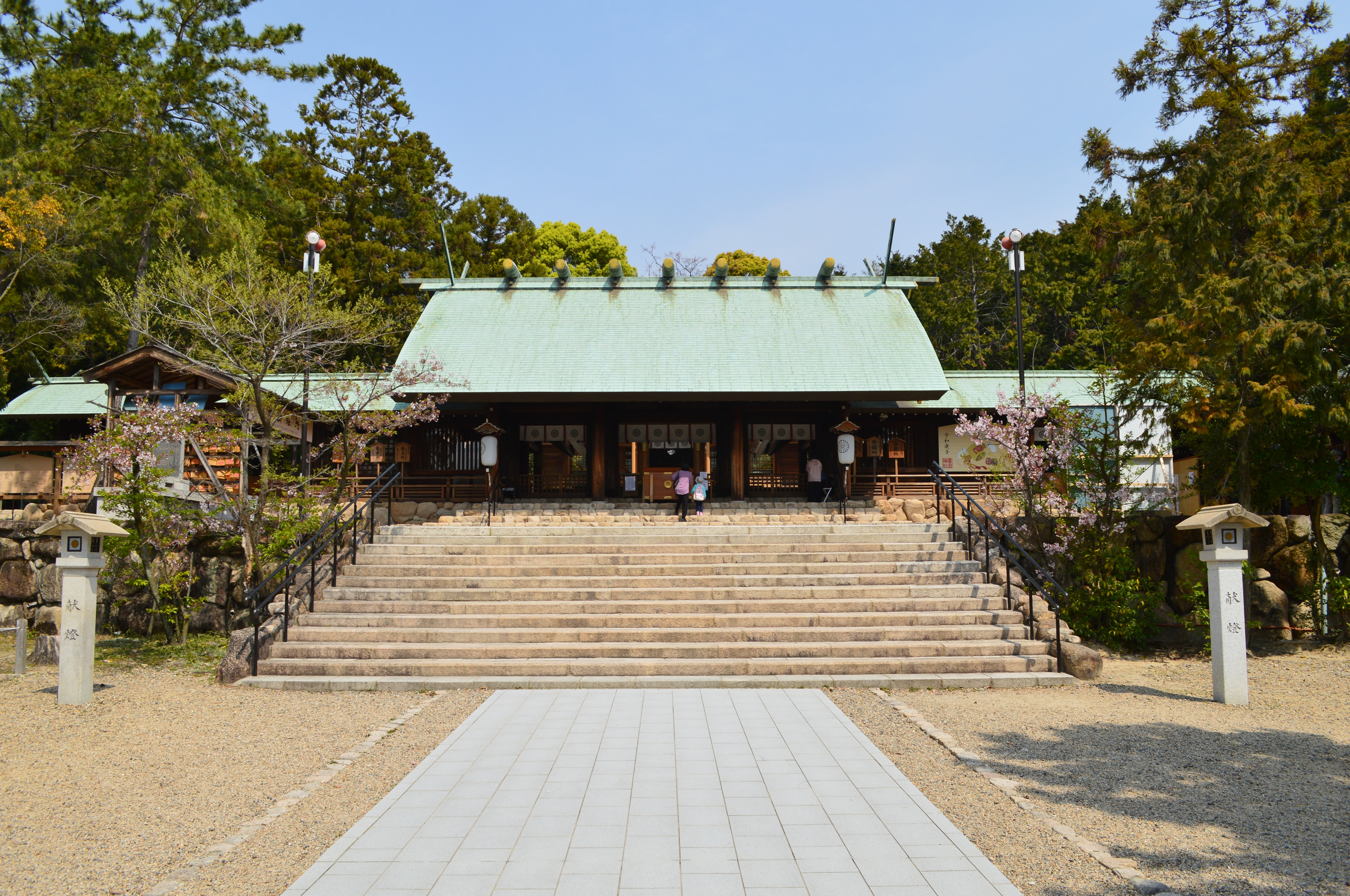
Hirota Shrine in Nishinomiya, Hyōgo Prefecture, where Amaterasu's aramitama is enshrined

At one time, when Emperor Chūai was on a campaign against the Kumaso tribes of Kyushu, his consort Jingū was possessed by unknown gods who told Chūai of a land rich in treasure located on the other side of the sea that is his for the taking. When Chūai doubted their words and accused them of being deceitful, the gods laid a curse upon him that he should die "without possessing this land." (The Kojiki and the Shoki diverge at this point: in the former, Chūai dies almost immediately after being cursed, while in the latter, he dies of a sudden illness a few months after.)

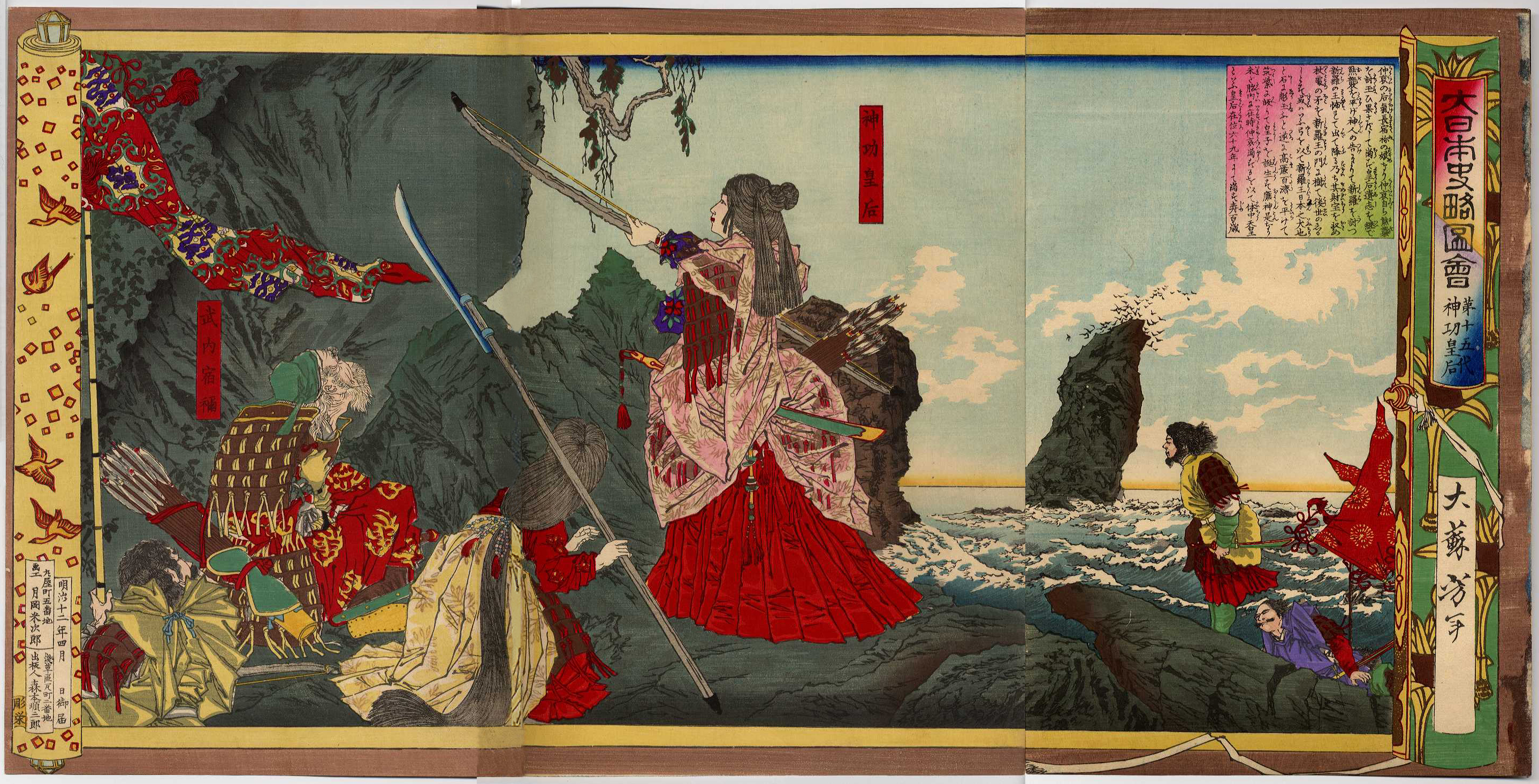
Empress Jingū

After Chūai's death, Jingū performed divination to ascertain which gods had spoken to her husband. The deities identified themselves as Tsukisakaki Izu no Mitama Amazakaru Mukatsuhime no Mikoto (撞賢木厳之御魂天疎向津媛命, 'The Awe-inspiring Spirit of the Planted Sakaki, the Lady of Sky-distant Mukatsu', usually interpreted as the aramitama or 'violent spirit' of Amaterasu), Kotoshironushi, and the three gods of Sumie (Sumiyoshi): Uwatsutsunoo, Nakatsutsunoo, and Sokotsutsunoo. (Note: The Kojiki's account meanwhile identifies the gods as Amaterasu and the three Sumiyoshi deities.) Worshiping the gods in accordance with their instructions, Jingū then set out to conquer the promised land beyond the sea: the three kingdoms of Korea.

When Jingū returned victorious to Japan, she enshrined the deities in places of their own choosing; Amaterasu, warning Jingū not to take her aramitama along to the capital, instructed her to install it in Hirota, the harbor where the empress disembarked.

== Family ==
=== Family tree ===
Amaterasu's family tree (based on the Kojiki)

Takamimusubi	Izanagi	Izanami
Watatsumi
Amaterasu	Susanoo	Tsukuyomi
Yorozuhata-Akitsuhime (Takuhata-Chijihime)	Ame-no-Oshihomimi	Ame no Hohi	Amatsuhikone	Ikutsuhikone	Kumanokusubi	Ōyamatsumi
Ninigi	Konohana-Sakuyahime
Hoori	Toyotamahime	Tamayorihime
Ugayafukiaezu
Emperor Jimmu

=== Consorts ===
She is a virgin goddess and never engages in sexual relationships. However, according to Nozomu Kawamura, she was a consort to a sun god and some telling stories place Tsukuyomi as her husband.

=== Siblings ===
Amaterasu has many siblings, most notably Susanoo and Tsukiyomi. Basil Hall Chamberlain used the words "elder brother" to translate her dialog referring to Susanoo in the Kojiki, even though he noted that she was his elder sister. The word (which was also used by Izanami to address her elder brother and husband Izanagi) was nase (phonetically spelt 那勢 in the Kojiki; modern dictionaries use the semantic spelling 汝兄, whose kanji literally mean 'my elder brother'), an ancient term used only by females to refer to their brothers, who had higher status than them. (As opposed to males using nanimo (汝妹; 'my younger sister') (那邇妹 in the Kojiki) to refer to their sisters, who had lower status than them.) The Nihon Shoki used the Chinese word 弟 ('younger brother') instead.

Some tellings say she had a sister named Wakahirume who was a weaving maiden and helped Amaterasu weave clothes for the other kami in heaven. Wakahirume was later accidentally killed by Susanoo.

Other traditions say she had an older brother named Hiruko.

=== Descendants ===
Amaterasu has five sons, Ame-no-oshihomimi, Ame no Hohi, Amatsuhikone, Ikutsuhikone, and Kumanokusubi, who were given birth to by Susanoo by chewing her hair jewels. According to one account in the Nihon Shoki, it was because these children were male that Susanoo won during the ritual to prove his intent, even though they were not his children, but hers. This explanation of the outcome of the ritual contradicts that in the Kojiki, according to which it was because she gave birth to female children using his sword, and those children were his. The Kojiki claims he won because he had daughters to whom she gave birth, while the Nihon Shoki claims he won because he himself gave birth to her sons. Several figures and noble clans claim descent from Amaterasu most notably the Japanese imperial family through Emperor Jimmu who descended from her grandson Ninigi.

Her son Ame no Hohi is considered the ancestral kami of clans in Izumo which includes the Haji clan, Sugawara clan, and the Senge clan. The legendary sumo wrestler Nomi no Sukune is believed to be a 14th-generation descendant of Amenohohi.

== Worship ==
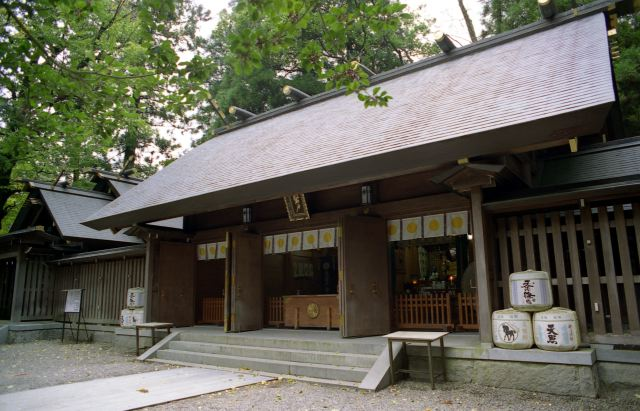
Amanoiwato Shrine (天岩戸神社)

=== Shrines ===
The Ise Grand Shrine (伊勢神宮 Ise Jingū) located in Ise, Mie Prefecture, Japan, houses the inner shrine, Naiku, dedicated to Amaterasu. Her sacred mirror, Yata no Kagami, is said to be kept at this shrine as one of the Imperial regalia objects. A ceremony known as Jingū Shikinen Sengū (神宮式年遷宮) is held every twenty years at this shrine to honor the many deities enshrined, which is formed by 125 shrines altogether. New shrine buildings are built at a location adjacent to the site first. After the transfer of the object of worship, new clothing and treasure and offering food to the goddess the old buildings are taken apart. The building materials taken apart are given to many other shrines and buildings to renovate. This practice is a part of the Shinto faith and has been practiced since the year 690 CE, but is not only for Amaterasu but also for many other deities enshrined in Ise Grand Shrine. Additionally, from the late 7th century to the 14th century, an unmarried princess of the Imperial Family, called "Saiō" (斎王) or itsuki no miko (斎皇女), served as the sacred priestess of Amaterasu at the Ise Shrine upon every new dynasty.

The Amanoiwato Shrine (天岩戸神社) in Takachiho, Miyazaki Prefecture, Japan is also dedicated to Amaterasu and sits above the gorge containing Ama-no-Iwato.

The worship of Amaterasu to the exclusion of other kami has been described as "the cult of the sun." This phrase may also refer to the early pre-archipelagoan worship of the sun.

According to the Engishiki (延喜式) and Sandai Jitsuroku (三代実録) of the Heian period, the sun goddess had many shrines named "Amateru" or "Amateru-mitama", which were mostly located in the Kinki area. However, there have also been records of a shrine on Tsushima Island, coined as either "Teruhi Gongen" or the "Shining Sun Deity" during medieval times. It was later found that such a shrine was meant for a male sun deity named Ameno-himitama.

Amaterasu was also once worshiped at Hinokuma shrines. The Hinokuma shrines were used to worship the goddess by the Ama people in the Kii Provinces. Because the Ama people were believed to have been fishermen, researchers have conjectured that the goddess was also worshiped for a possible connection to the sea.

In Kurozumikyō, a Shinto-derived new religion that was founded in 1814 by Munetada Kurozumi (黒住宗忠), Amaterasu is the supreme deity that is worshipped.

Amaterasu is also the main deity worshipped in the Shinto-derived new religion Tenshō Kōtai Jingūkyō, founded by Kitamura Sayo.

Amaterasu was thought by some in the early 20th century until after World War II to have "created the Japanese archipelago from the drops of water that fell from her spear" and in historic times, the spear was an item compared to the sun and solar deities.

=== Differences in worship ===
Amaterasu, while primarily being the goddess of the sun, is also sometimes worshiped as having connections with other aspects and forms of nature. Amaterasu can also be considered a goddess of the wind and typhoons alongside her brother, and even possibly death. There are many connections between local legends in the Ise region with other goddesses of nature, such as a nameless goddess of the underworld and sea. It is possible that Amaterasu's name became associated with these legends in the Shinto religion as it grew throughout Japan.

One source interprets from the Heavenly Rock Cave myth that Amaterasu was seen as being responsible for the normal cycle of day and night.

A historical myth holds that she painted the islands of Japan into being, alongside her siblings Susanoo and Tsukuyomi.

In contrast, Amaterasu, while enshrined at other locations, also can be seen as the goddess that represents Japan and its ethnicity. The many differences in Shinto religion and mythology can be due to how different local gods and beliefs clashed. In the Meiji Era, the belief in Amaterasu fought against the Izumo belief in Ōkuninushi for spiritual control over the land of Japan. During this time, the religious nature of Okininushi may have been changed to be included in Shinto mythology. Osagawara Shouzo built shrines in other countries to mainly spread Japan's culture and Shinto religion. It, however, was usually seen as the worshiping of Japan itself, rather than Amaterasu. Most of these colonial and oversea shrines were destroyed after WWII.

=== Other worshiped forms ===
==== Snake ====
Outside of being worshiped as a sun goddess, some have argued that Amaterasu was once related to snakes. There was a legend circulating among the Ise Priests that essentially described an encounter of Amaterasu sleeping with the Saiō every night in the form of a snake or lizard, evidenced by fallen scales in the priestess' bed. This was recorded by a medieval monk in his diary, which stated that "in ancient times Amaterasu was regarded as a snake deity or as a sun deity." In the Ise kanjō, the god's snake form is considered an embodiment of the "three poisons", namely greed, anger, and ignorance. Amaterasu is also linked to a snake cult, which is also tied to the theory that the initial gender of the goddess was male.

==== Dragon ====
In general, some of these Amaterasu–dragon associations have been in reference to Japanese plays. One example has been within the Chikubushima tradition in which the dragon goddess Benzaiten was the emanation of Amaterasu. Following that, in the Japanese epic, Taiheki, one of the characters, Nitta Yoshisada (新田義貞), made comparisons with Amaterasu and a dragon Ryūjin with the quote: "I have heard that the Sun Goddess of Ise … conceals her true being in the august image of Vairocana, and that she has appeared in this world in the guise of a dragon god of the blue ocean."

Another tradition of the Heavenly Cave story depicts Amaterasu as a "dragon-fox" (shinko or tatsugitsune) during her descent to the famed cave because it is a type of animal/kami that emits light from its entire body.

The connection between the fox, Dakiniten, and Amaterasu can also be seen in the Keiran Shūyōshū, which features the following retelling of the myth of Amaterasu's hiding:

Question: What was the appearance of Amaterasu when she was hiding in the Rock-Cave of Heaven?

Answer: Since Amaterasu is the sun deity, she had the appearance of the sun-disc. Another tradition says: When Amaterasu retired into the Rock-Cave of Heaven after her descent from Heaven (sic), she took on the appearance of a dragon-fox (shinko). Uniquely among all animals, the dragon-fox is a kami that emits light from its body; this is the reason why she took on this appearance.

Question: Why does the dragon-fox emit light?

Answer: The dragon-fox is an expedient body of Nyoirin Kannon. It takes the wish-fulfilling gem as its body, and is therefore called King Cintāmaṇi. ... Further, one tradition says that one becomes a king by revering the dragon-fox because the dragon-fox is an expedient body of Amaterasu.

Commenting on the sokui kanjō, Bernard Faure writes:

under the name "Fox King," Dakiniten became a manifestation of the sun goddess Amaterasu, with whom the new emperor united during the enthronement ritual. [...] The Buddhist ritual allowed the ruler to symbolically cross over the limits separating the human and animal realms to harness the wild and properly superhuman energy of the "infrahuman" world, so as to gain full control of the human sphere.

== In Japanese Buddhism ==
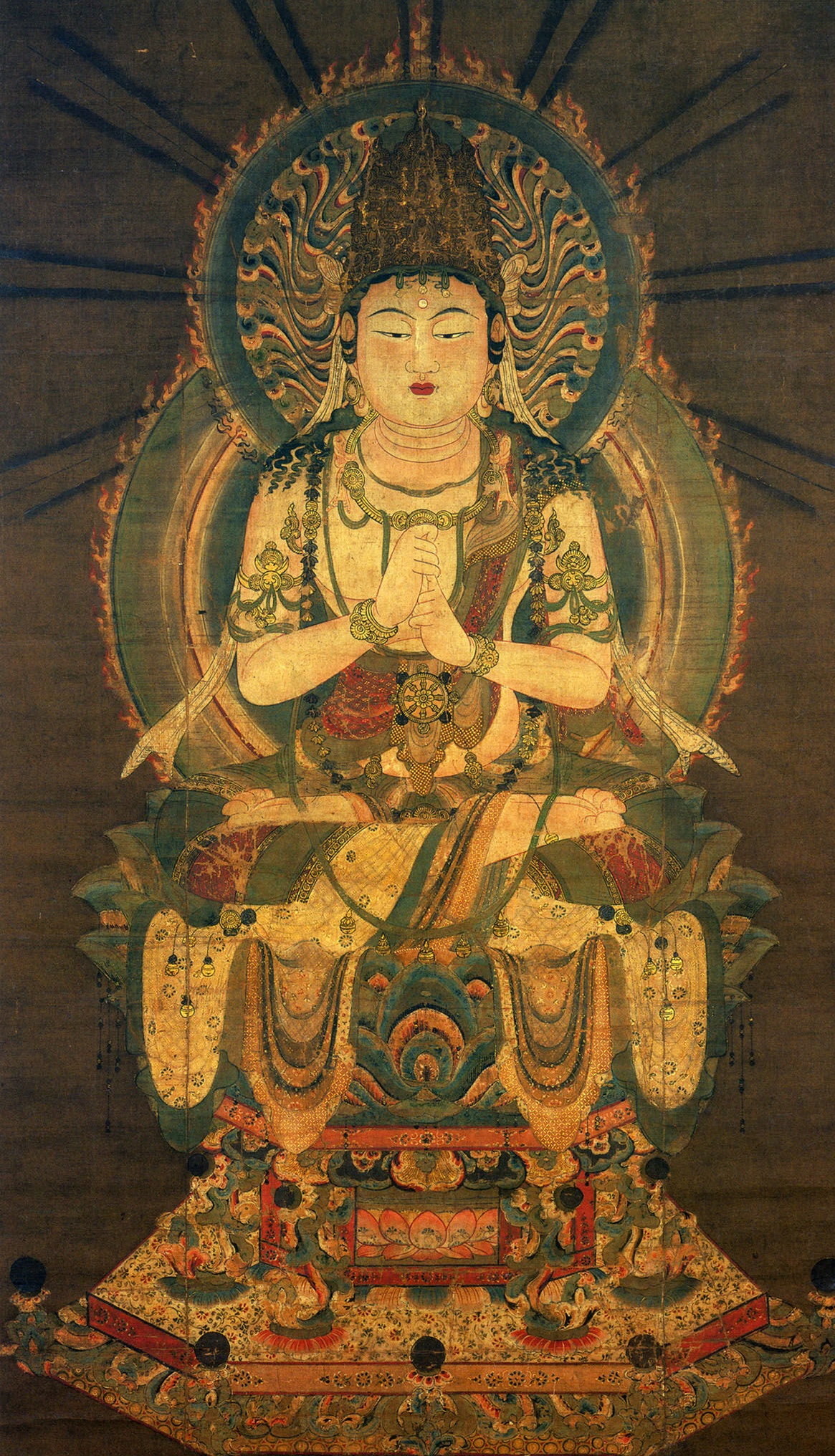
In Japanese Buddhism, Amaterasu was identified with Dainichi, the "Great Sun" Buddha.

In Japanese Buddhism, Amaterasu was incorporated into a broad pantheon in which local kami were understood through the doctrinal frameworks of honji suijaku theories of correspondence. Rather than being treated as an independent creator deity, Amaterasu was interpreted as the “trace manifestation” (suijaku) of a Buddha, whose “original ground” (honji) was identified variously depending on sectarian orientation and local cultic developments. The trace-original ground framework allowed Buddhist scholastics to subordinate and encompass the sun goddess, along with various other kami, within a universal Buddhist cosmos. Textual materials from the Nara and Heian periods show that she came to function as a paradigmatic example of the capacity of Buddhas to appear as local deities for the sake of guiding beings.

Within esoteric Buddhist traditions like Tendai and Shingon, Amaterasu was frequently correlated with Dainichi Nyorai (Mahavariocana, "All Illuminator"), the cosmic Buddha who embodies the wisdom and luminosity. Shingon scholastics like Dōhan directly identified the two figures. This identification of the two deities is also found in the writings of Saigyō Hōshi who himself worshiped at the Grand Shrine of Ise, and in Kitabatake Chikafusa's Jinnō Shōtōki. These doctrinal associations were supported by ritual elaborations at Shinto shrines, which were often attached to Buddhist temples, where Buddhist clergy participated in ceremonies that merged esoteric liturgy with traditional shrine rites. Amaterasu worship was also central to the syncretic Ryōbu Shintō sects, which drew extensively on Shingon Buddhist thought and practice.

Worship of Amaterasu within Buddhist contexts was further intensified by her close connection to the imperial house. Buddhist theorists, by linking her to Dainichi or other buddhas, reinforced the legitimacy of the imperial order within a universal Buddhist cosmology. Court-sponsored rituals blended Buddhist and kami-centered elements, and pilgrimage to Ise developed as a practice compatible with Buddhist soteriological aims. Medieval narratives, such as those found in shrine-origin texts (engi), frequently emphasize that Amaterasu protects the state precisely because she is an expedient manifestation of a higher Buddhist power. In these accounts, the prosperity of the realm and the stability of the imperial lineage were understood as outcomes of the harmonious integration of Buddhist principle and kami manifestation.

Local cults also adapted Amaterasu to specific devotional functions and freely mixed Shinto and Buddhist ideas. This kind of religious syncretism is called Shinbutsu-shūgō and was a common feature of pre-modern Japanese religious culture. The spread of syncretic institutions like jingūji (shrine-temples) provided an institutional basis for sustained Buddhist interaction with the deity, including the recitation of sutras to honor the kami, the construction of Buddhist icons representing their honji forms, and the performance of goma (fire rituals) intended to secure the divine protection. These practices reflect the broader medieval understanding that kami could receive Buddhist offerings and respond with worldly benefits, while ultimately serving the liberating activity of buddhas.

The situation changed significantly during the Meiji period, especially with the rise of nativist anti-Buddhist movements that questioned or rejected Buddhist interpretive dominance, culminating in the rise of State Shinto and the official separation of Shinto from Buddhism, shinbutsu bunri (神仏分離).

== Relation to women's positions in early Japanese society ==
Because Amaterasu has the highest position among the Shinto deities, there has been debate on her influence and relation to women's positions in early Japanese society. Some scholars have argued that the goddess' presence and high stature within the kami system could suggest that early rulers in Japan were female. Others have argued the goddess' presence implies strong influences female priests had in Japanese politics and religion.

== In Japanese new religions ==
Amaterasu is the main deity, or one of the main deities, worshipped in various Japanese new religions, including Kurozumikyō, Shintō Tenkōkyo, Tenshō Kōtai Jingūkyō, and Kōmyō Kamu Tama Jingū.

== See also ==
- Amaterasu particle
- Dakini
- First sunrise
- Himiko
- List of solar deities
- Ōkami Amaterasu
- Shinto in popular culture
- Solar myths
- Tokapcup-kamuy
- Vairocana
