= Ame no Hohi =

Japanese kami

- The sun
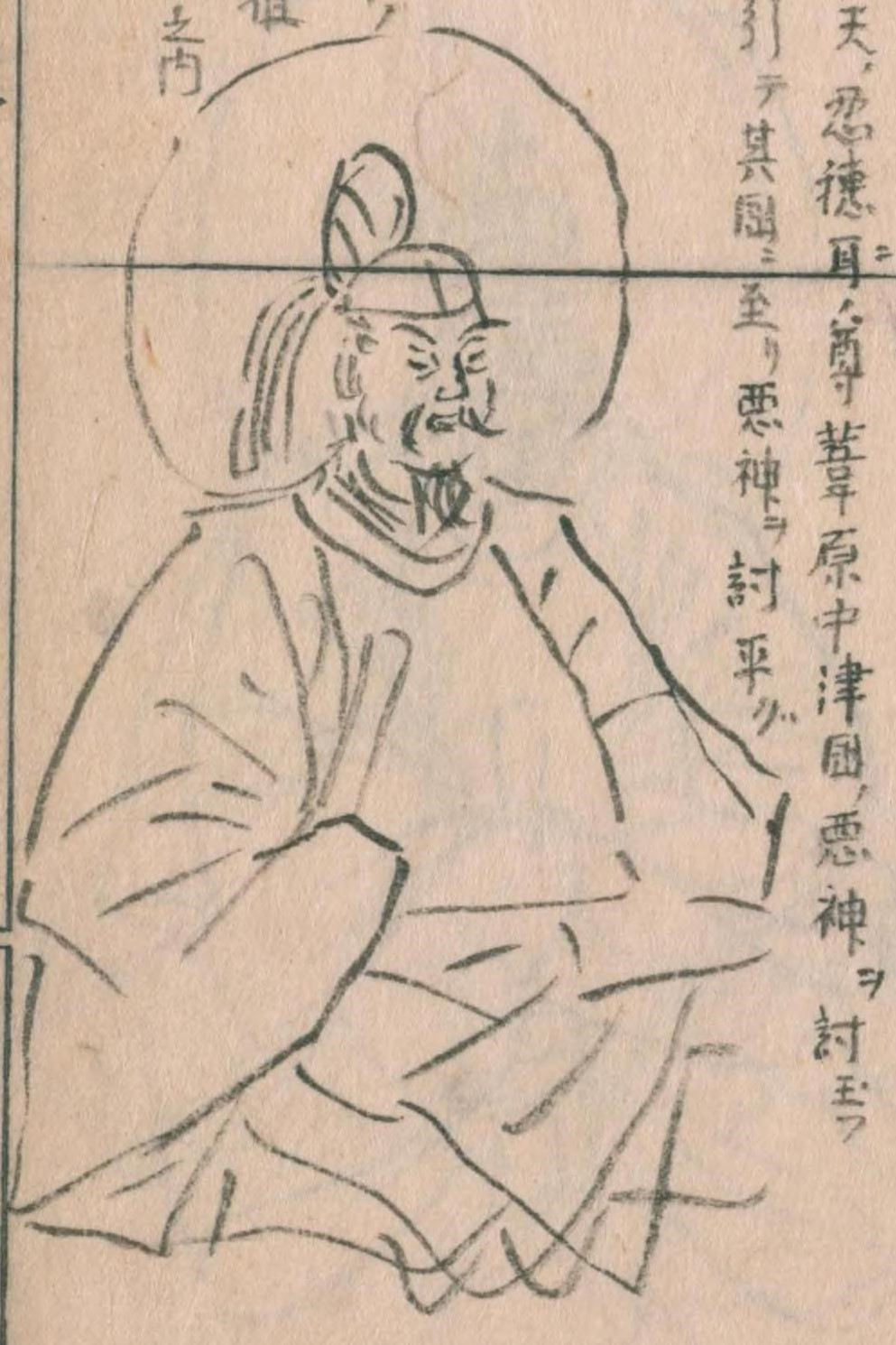
- Other names: Ame no Hohi no Mikoto (天之菩卑能命, 天菩比命, 天菩比神, 天穂日命, 天穂比命); Ame no Fuhi no Mikoto (天乃夫比命)

Genealogy
- Parents: Amaterasu (mother)
- Siblings: Ame-no-oshihomimi; Amatsuhikone; Ikutsuhikone; Kumanokusubi
- Children: Ame no Wakahiko; Ame-no-Hinadori; Takehi-Nateru

Ame no Hohi (天菩比神, 天穗日命,アメノホヒ, "Heavenly grain sun"), also known as Ame no Fuhi (天乃夫比, アメノフヒ) is a male deity and the second son of sun goddess Amaterasu in Japanese mythology. Izumo no Kuni no Miyatsuko or the historical rulers of Izumo and modern heads of Izumo-taisha and Izumo-taishakyo descend from him.

== Mythology ==
Oath between Amaterasu and Susanoo (based on the Kojiki)

Ame no Hohi is found in the main works of literature that record the mythology and the mythologized history of Japan. He is found in both the Kojiki and the Nihon Shoki as Ame no Hohi no Mikoto (Kojiki: 天之菩卑能命, 天菩比命, 天菩比神; Nihon Shoki: 天穂日命). In the Izumo no Kuni Fudoki he is referred to as Ame no Fuhi no Mikoto (天乃夫比命). He is also mentioned in the Engishiki by the name Ame no Hohi no Mikoto (天穂比命).

In some myths he was sent first to earth to rule after his brother Ame-no-oshihomimi refused the offer. However, when he didn't return after three years they sent another god to rule.

== Family ==
Ame no Hohi's sons are called Ame-no-Hinadori and Takehi-Nateru. Ame no Hohi is believed to be the ancestor of the Izumo no Omi as well as the priests of the Izumo and Sugawara clans. Nomi no Sukune is said to be one of his descendants. He is also believed to be the ancestor of the Haji clan.

== Worship ==
Ame no Hohi is worhsipped across Japan as a god of agriculture, ears of rice, sericulture, cotton fabric, and industry, among other things.

The Japanese version of this page lists the following shrines as being dedicated to Ame no Hohi:

- Noki Shrine - Yasugi, Shimane Prefecture
- Izumo-taisha (setsumatsusha) - Izumo, Shimane Prefecture
- Washinomiya Shrine - Kuki, Saitama Prefecture
- Kiryūten-mangū - Kiryū, Gunma Prefecture
- Ame no Hohi no Mikoto Shrine - Tottori, Tottori Prefecture
- Ōe Shrine - Hashigashira, Tottori Prefecture
- Ashiya Shrine - Ashiya, Hyōgo Prefecture (There is an iwakura dedicated to him on the grounds of the Rokkosan Country House, at the top of Mount Rokkō)
- Dōmyōji Tenmangū - Fujiidera, Osaka Prefecture
- Yamasaka Shrine - Higashisumiyoshi-ku, Osaka
- Umamiokawatamuki Shrine - Hino, Shiga Prefecture
- Dazaifu Tenmangū (setsumatsusha) - Dazaifu, Fukuoka Prefecture
- Ame no Hohi no Mikoto Shrine - Kyoto
- Kamo Shrine (setsumatsusha) - Imabari, Ehime Prefecture

Tagata Shrine is a shrine dedicated to Ame no Hohi. He is also said to be enshrined at Kameido Tenjin Shrine.
