= Kumanokusubi =

God in Japanese mythology

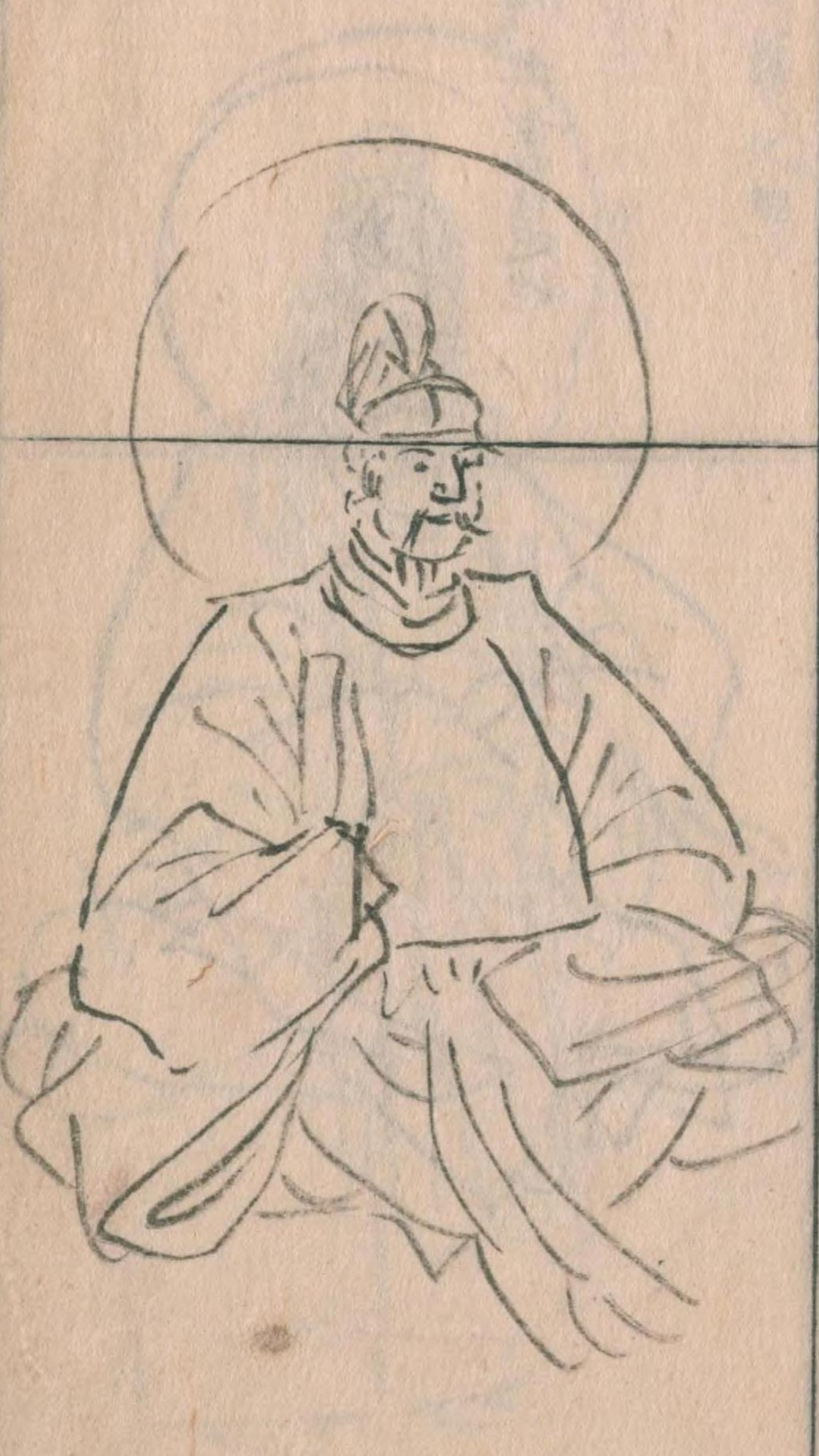

Genealogy
- Parents: Amaterasu (mother)
- Siblings: Ame-no-hohi (brother) Ame-no-oshihomimi (brother) Ikutsuhikone (brother) Amatsuhikone (brother)

Oath between Amaterasu and Susanoo (based on the Kojiki)

Kumanokusubi (熊野久须毘命,熊野櫲樟日命, Wonder Worker of Bear Moors) is a God in Japanese mythology. He is the fifth son of Amaterasu.

Some scholars have identified this kami as the saijin at the shrine Kumano Jinja in Shimane Prefecture.

== Name ==
He goes by other names like Kumano no oshihomi no mikoto, Kumano no oshikuma no mikoto, Kumano no oshisumi no mikoto, and Kumano no osumi no mikoto.

== Summary ==
He was born out of a kami-making competition between Amaterasu and Susanoo.

In many versions, Susanoo took Amaterasu's beads and crushed them within his mouth, which created five male kami. The first one to be born was Amenooshihomimi, second was Ame-no-hohi, third was Amatsuhikone, fourth was Ikutsuhikone, and Kumanokusubi was the fifth.

== Related to Kumano ==
The deity's name, Kusubi (Kusuhi), is thought to mean "strange spirit" (mysterious divine spirit) or "strange fire". The current deity of Kumano-taisha is "Kumano-taishin Kushimikino- no-mikoto," but there is a theory that the original deity was Kumanokusubi.

Kumano-taishin Kushimikino- no-mikoto," but there is a theory that the original deity was Kumanokusubi. There is a theory that the deity of Kumano Nachi Taisha, Kumanokusubi, is Izamiami, but this is also believed to be a reference to Kumanokusubi.}
