= Haji clan =

Japanese clan

- 土師氏

Profile
- Country: Japan
- Haji clan no longer has a chief, and is an armigerous clan

The Haji clan (土師氏, Haji-uji, Haji-shi) is a Japanese clan. The clan administered earthenware artisans, organized collectively into a group called Haji-be (土師部). During the Yamato period, these artisans worked chiefly on soil-related matters, such as creating haniwa, constructing tombs and kofun, and handling other civil engineering. The kabane titles of the clan are Sukune or Muraji. They were engaged in constructing the tombs of high-ranking people as well as managing the funeral ceremonies of the ōkimi ("great lords").

== History ==
The Haji clan claims descent from Ame-no-hohi, the second son of Amaterasu, which makes them relatives of the Japanese Imperial Family. Nomi no Sukune was believed to be the ancestor of the clan. According to legend, he was the inventor of haniwa, the terracotta clay figurines buried with a nobleman and used as a symbolic substitute for junshi, the practice whereby members of high-ranking households would commit suicide upon the passing of the household head, as a way to continue serving them in death.

The clan was later divided into three houses: the Sugawara clan, the Akishino clan, and the Ōe clan.

They are relatives of the Izumo clan who are also descended from Ame no Hohi and run Izumo-taishakyo today.

== Name ==
The clan takes its name from haji (土師), a shift from older hani-shi, from 埴 (hani, "red clay", such as used to make terracotta) + 師 (-shi, a Chinese-derived suffix appended to indicate "master" of a craft). The hani-shi were masters of the crafts of earthenware and earthwork engineering.

In Japanese mythology, the name was given to the founder of the clan, Nomi no Sukune by Emperor Suinin after he crafted haniwa for the burial of Empress Hibasuhime.

== See also ==
- Hajinosato Station
- Nomi no Sukune
- Sugawara clan
