= Ikutsuhikone =

Japanese deity

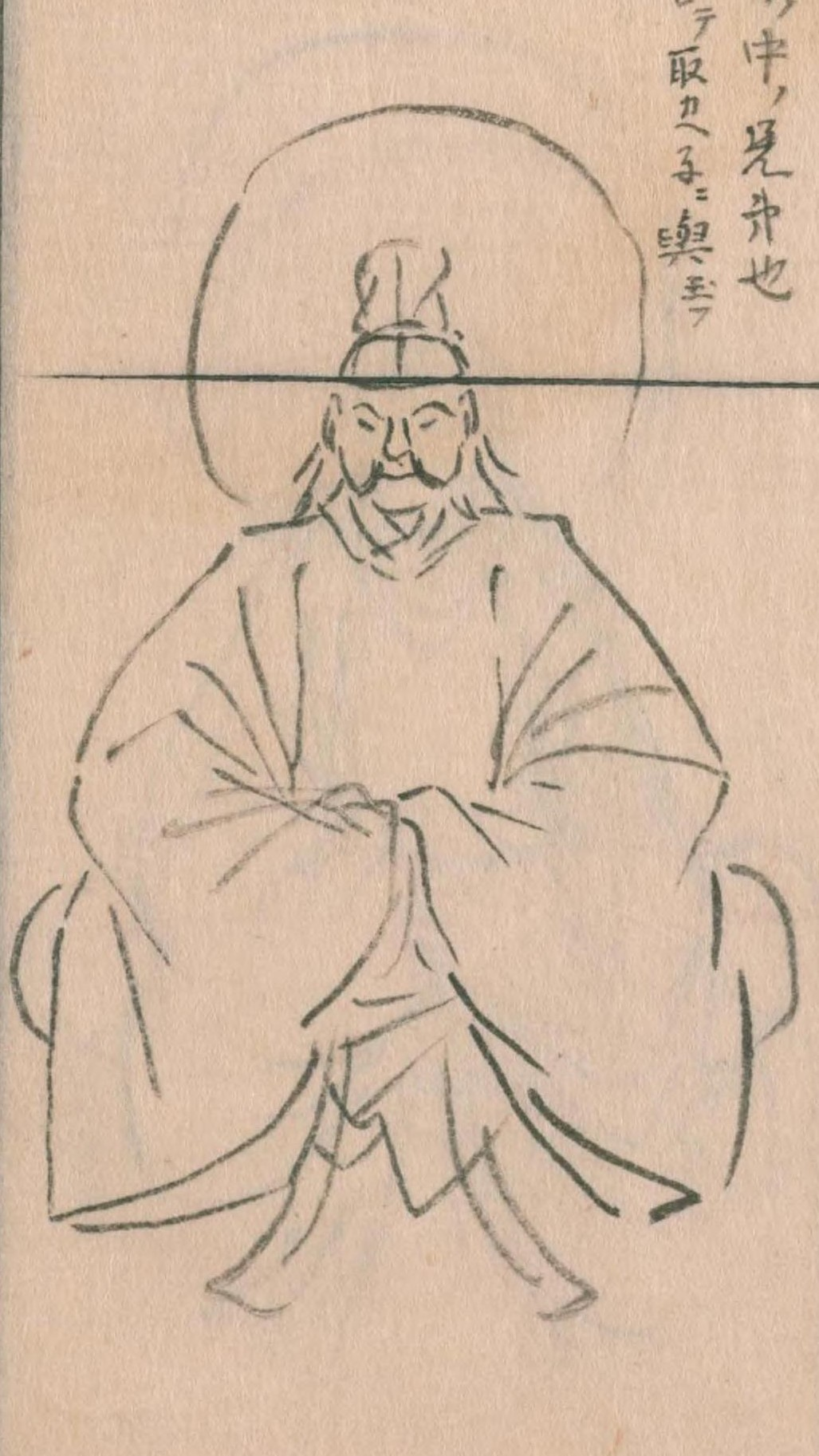

Genealogy
- Parents: Amaterasu (mother)
- Siblings: Ame-no-oshihomimi (brother), Amatsuhikone (brother), Ame no Hohi (brother), Kumanokusubi (brother)

Ikutsuhikone (Japanese: イクツヒコネ,活津日子根命/活津彦根命) is a god of Japanese mythology. He is the fourth son of Amaterasu. In many versions of his birth story, he is born from Amaterasu’s jewels after being chewed up and spat out by Susanoo-no-Mikoto.

He was fourth born of the five children of the jewels of Amaterasu. In another version he comes from Susanoo-no-Mikoto's jewels directly and is thus his son.

== Birth ==
Oath between Amaterasu and Susanowo (based on the Kojiki)

He was born out of a kami-making competition between Amaterasu and Susanoo. In many versions of the story, Susanoo took Amaterasu's beads and crushed them within his mouth, which created five male kami. The first one to be born was Ame-no-oshihomimi, second was Ame-no-hohi, third was Amatsuhikone, fourth was Ikutsuhikone, and Kumanokusubi was the fifth.
