= Sugawara no Kiyotomo =

Japanese courtier, bureaucrat (770–842)

Sugawara no Kiyotomo 菅原清公
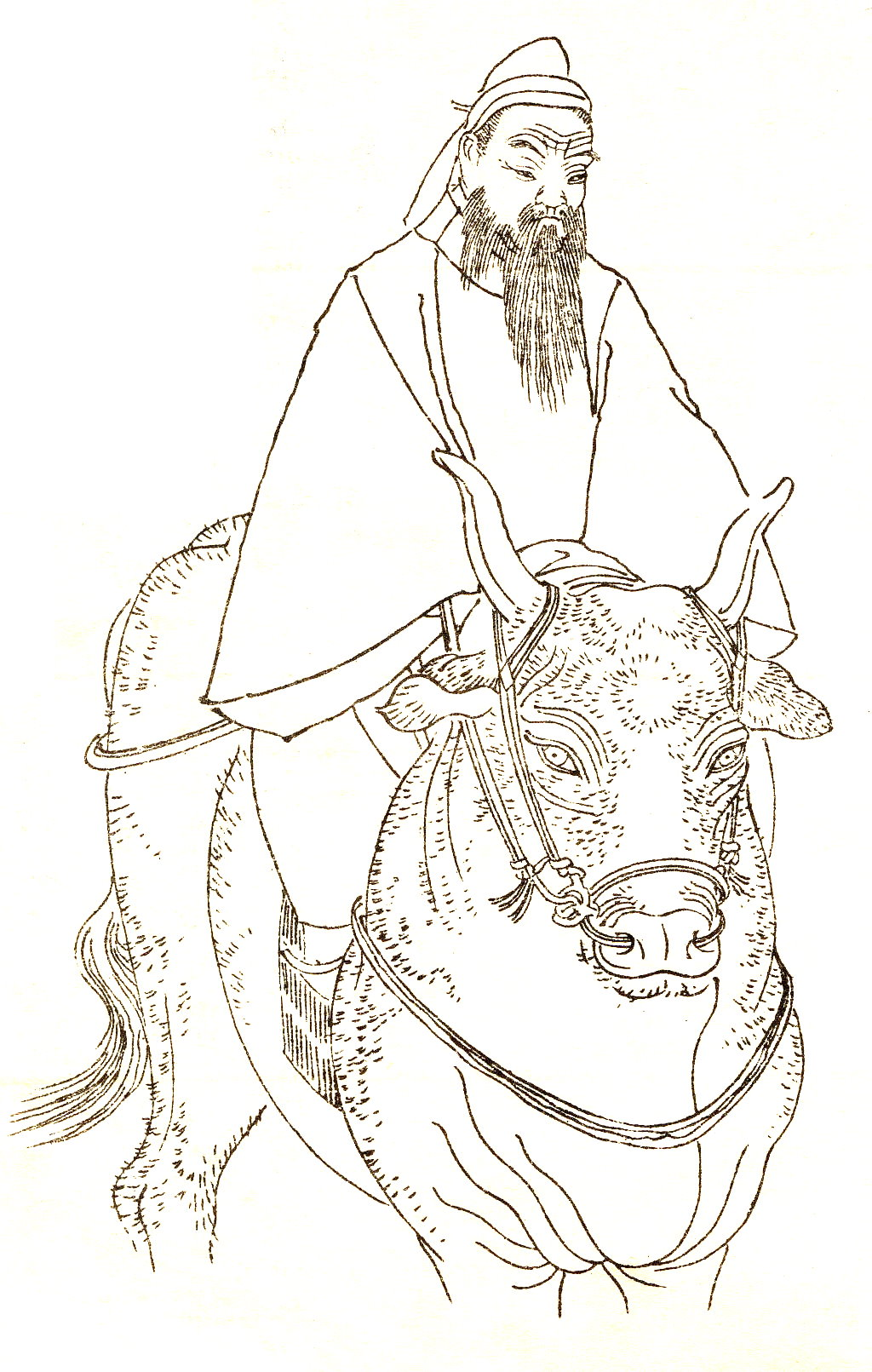
- Sugawara no Kiyotomo by Kikuchi Yōsai
- Born: 770
- Died: November 26, 842
- Family: Sugawara clan
- Issue: Sugawara no Koreyoshi
- Father: Sugawara no Furuhito
- Occupation: court noble, poet, politician

Sugawara no Kiyotomo (菅原 清公; 770 – November 26, 842), also read as Kiyokimi, was a Japanese court noble, poet, and politician of the early Heian period. He served as Vice Minister of Ceremonial Affairs, Mayor of the Left Capital District, and Vice Governor of Harima Province (824–825), and held the court rank of Junior Third Rank.

He was the father of Sugawara no Koreyoshi, and grandfather of Sugawara no Michizane who was deified as Tenjin, the deity of scholarship.

== Life ==
He was born in 770 as the fourth son of Governor (suke kokushi) of Tōtōmi Province, Sugawara no Furuhito. Although his father was a well-known Confucian scholar, his home was poor and Kiyotomo and his brothers suffered from poverty. Because his home was poor, he decided to study economic history.

In 784, after an imperial edict, he began his service under Crown Prince Sawara and became a student of literary studies at the Imperial University in 789, at the age of 20. He excelled in his studies and was a monjō tokugōshō, a title awarded to the two best students at the university who are eligible to take the examination to become a government official. After this, Kiyotomo was appointed Junior Secretary (shōjō) of Mino Province. In 798, he was appointed Junior Secretary of the Imperial University.

In 804, he was sent as a missionary to Tang China, and following this, Emperor Saga changed his formal dress into Tang style. Returning in 805, Kiyotomo was influential in bringing several attributes of Tang culture into the Japanese court, such as Tang architecture and court manners. He was also a well-known scholar of his time, giving lectures to the court nobility about Chinese books such as Wen Xuan and Book of the Later Han.

After his return from Tang China, he received the court rank of Junior Fifth Rank, Lower Grade and was appointed assistant director of the Imperial University (daigaku no suke).

After this, he served as chief expert on literacy (monjō hakase), Vice Minister of Ceremonial Affairs (shikibu taifu), Senior Assistant of the Imperial Prosecuting and Investigating Office (danjō daihitsu), and Mayor of the Left Capital District (Sakyō no Daibu), and received the court rank of Junior Third Rank.

In 824, Kiyotomo was appointed as Vice Governor (gon no kami) of Harima Province. However, the upper court nobility (kugyō) opposed this decision as they did not want "the founding father of the nation" of such great talent to be sent so far. He was sent back to the capital the next year.

In his elder years, he began having trouble to walk, and was allowed to enter the Imperial Palace on a bullock carriage. It is said that his appearance never seemed to age and he always used "an effective medicine", which is thought to be something he received in Tang China.

Kiyotomo also helped compile a poetry anthology called Ryōunshū, along with Ono no Minemori, in 814. He also participated in the compilation of Bunka Shūreishū and Ryōnogige.

He died on November 26, 842, at the age of 71 or 72.

== Family ==
- Father: Sugawara no Furuhito
- Mother: Unknown
- Children:
  - Third son: Sugawara no Yoshinushi (803–852)
  - Fourth son: Sugawara no Koreyoshi (812–880)
  - Son: Sugawara no Okiyoshi
  - Son: Sugawara no Tadaomi
  - Son: Sugawara no Zesan
  - Daughter: Sugawara no Yasuko
