= Amatsuhikone =

Figure in Japanese mythology

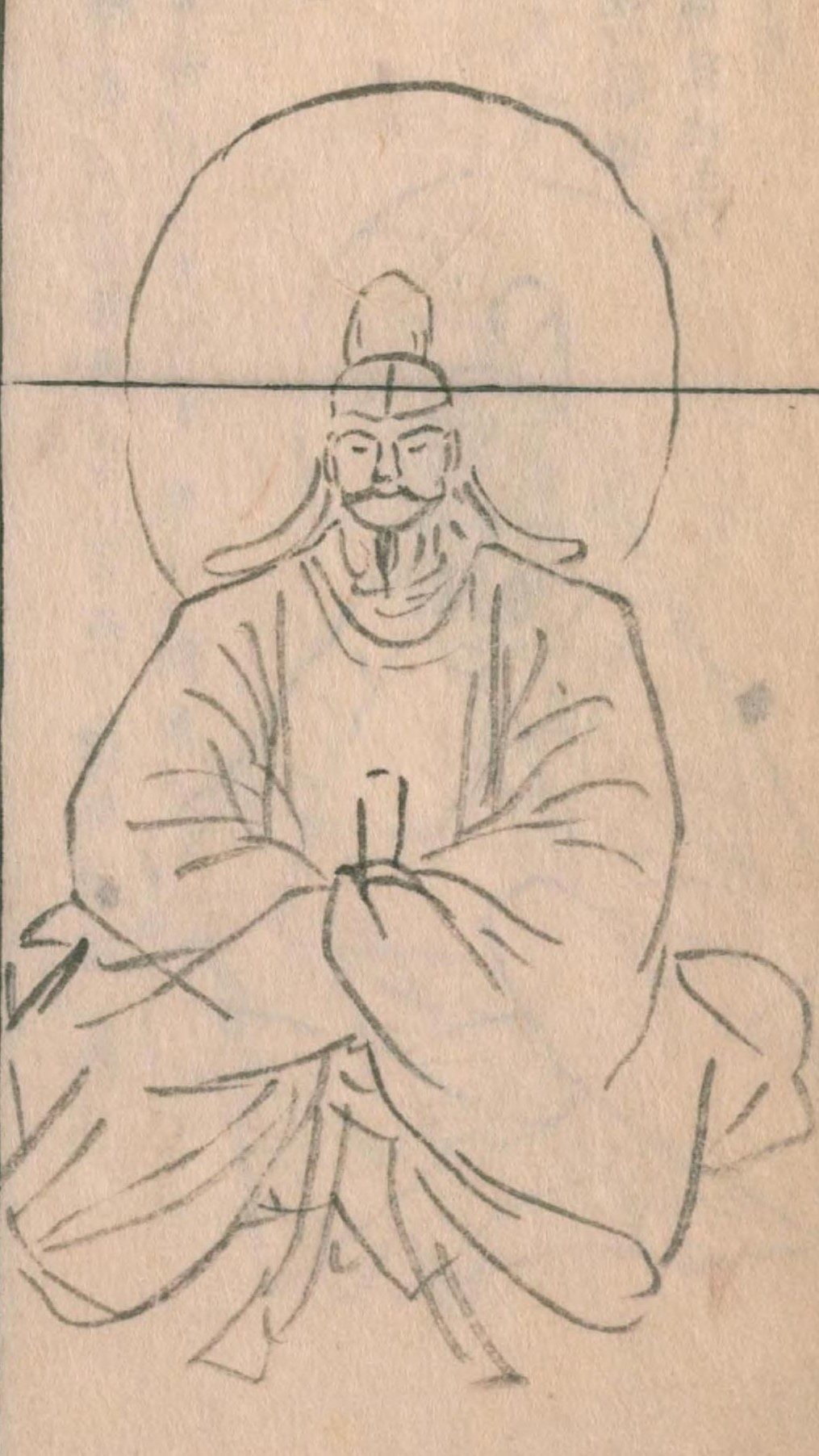

Genealogy
- Parents: Amaterasu (mother)
- Siblings: Ame-no-hohi (brother) Ame-no-oshihomimi (brother) Ikutsuhikone (brother) Kumanokusubi (brother)
- Children: Ame-no-mikage-no-mikoto

Amatsuhikone (天津日子根命,天津彥根命, which means little lad of Heaven) in Japanese mythology is the third son of Amaterasu.

In many versions, he is born from Amaterasu's jewels in her hair. In other versions he is born from the vine used to bind Amaterasu's hair.

He is believed to be the ancestor of several clans, including the Oshikochi and Yamashiro clans.

Ame-no-mikage-no-mikoto is his son. He later descended onto 432-meter Mount Mikami during the reign of Emperor Kōrei (290 - 215 BC) to become the shintai of the mountain. On the mountain Mikami Shrine was built to worship him. It is a Shinto shrine located in the city of Yasu, Shiga Prefecture, Japan.

Oath between Amaterasu and Susanowo (based on the Kojiki)
