= Ame-no-oshihomimi =

Japanese royal

Oshihomimi
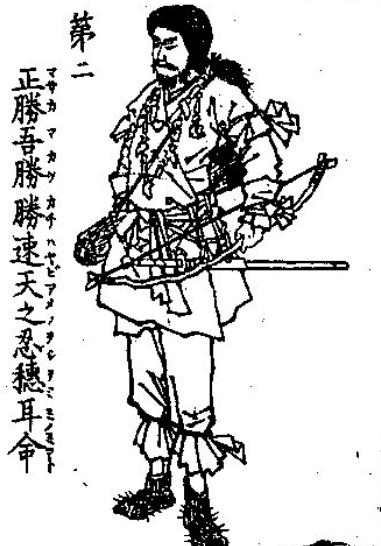

Genealogy
- Parents: Susanoo (father); Amaterasu (mother)
- Siblings: Ame no Hohi; Amatsuhikone; Ikutsuhikone; Kumanokusubi
- Consort: Takuhadachiji-hime
- Children: Ninigi-no-Mikoto; Amenohoakari

Amenooshihomimi (天忍穗耳尊,天之忍穂耳命) or Oshihomimi for short, is the first son of Amaterasu.

He is believed to be the ancestor to the Japanese Imperial family.

== Name and etymology ==
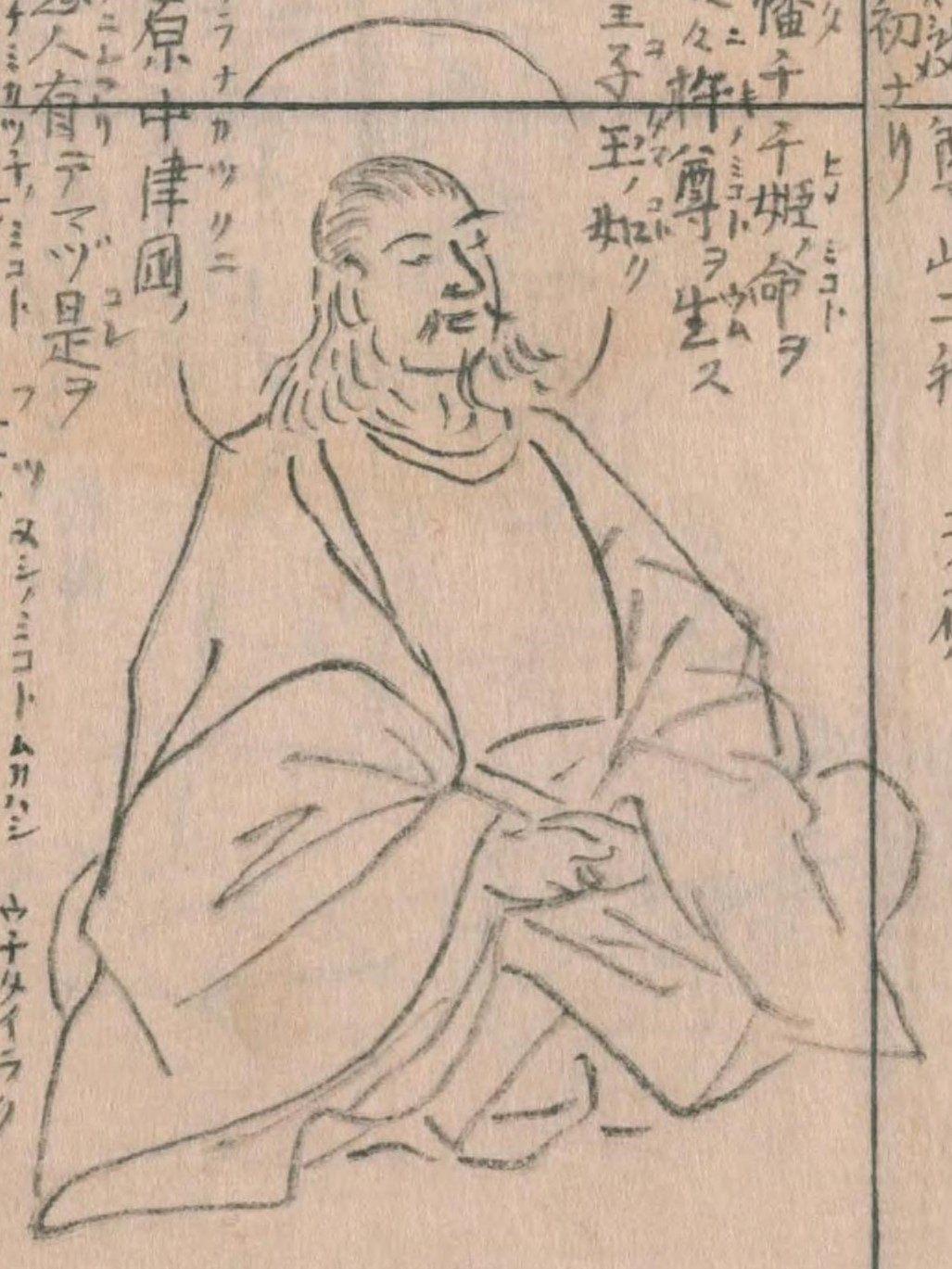

Amenooshihomimi name means "Ruling Rice Ears of Heaven". He also goes by other names like Masakatsu-akatsukachi-hayahi-ame-no-oshihomimi which means "Truly Winning Have I Won with Rushing Might Ruling Grand Rice Ears of Heaven".

== Mythology ==
=== Birth ===
Oath between Amaterasu and Susanowo (based on the Kojiki)

He was born out of a kami-making competition between Amaterasu and Susanoo.

In many versions, Susanoo took Amaterasu's beads and crushed them within his mouth, which created five male kami. The first one to be born was Amenooshihomimi, second was Ame-no-hohi, third was Amatsuhikone, fourth was Ikutsuhikone, and Kumanokusubi was the fifth.

=== Offer to rule ===
In some versions, Amaterasu gave Amenooshihomimi a bronze mirror, which was called Yata no Kagami. In many versions, Amenooshihomimi is the first to be offered as the ruler of earth however, he turns it down.

He fell in love with Takuhadachiji-hime, and then later on fathered Ninigi-no-Mikoto.

== Worship ==
- The shrine Nogami-jinja is dedicated to Oshihomimi and his wife.
- The shrine Hikosan Jingū also worships him

== Family Tree ==
Amaterasu	Takamimusubi
Ame-no-oshihomimi	Takuhadachiji-hime	Ōyamatsumi
Ninigi-no-Mikoto （天孫）	Konohanasakuya-hime	Watatsumi
Hoderi	Hosuseri （海幸彦）	Hoori （山幸彦）	Toyotama-hime	Utsushihikanasaku	Furutama-no-mikoto
Tensori no Mikoto	Ugayafukiaezu	Tamayori-hime	Azumi people	（Owari clan Yamato clan)
Hayato people	Itsuse	Inahi	Mikeiri	Jimmu	Ahiratsu-hime
Imperial House of Japan	Tagishimimi

- Red background is female.
- Green background means groups
- Bold letters are three generations of Hyuga.

== See also ==
- Kuni-yuzuri
