= Sugawara no Koreyoshi =

Japanese aristocrat and poet (812–880)

Sugawara no Koreyoshi 菅原是善
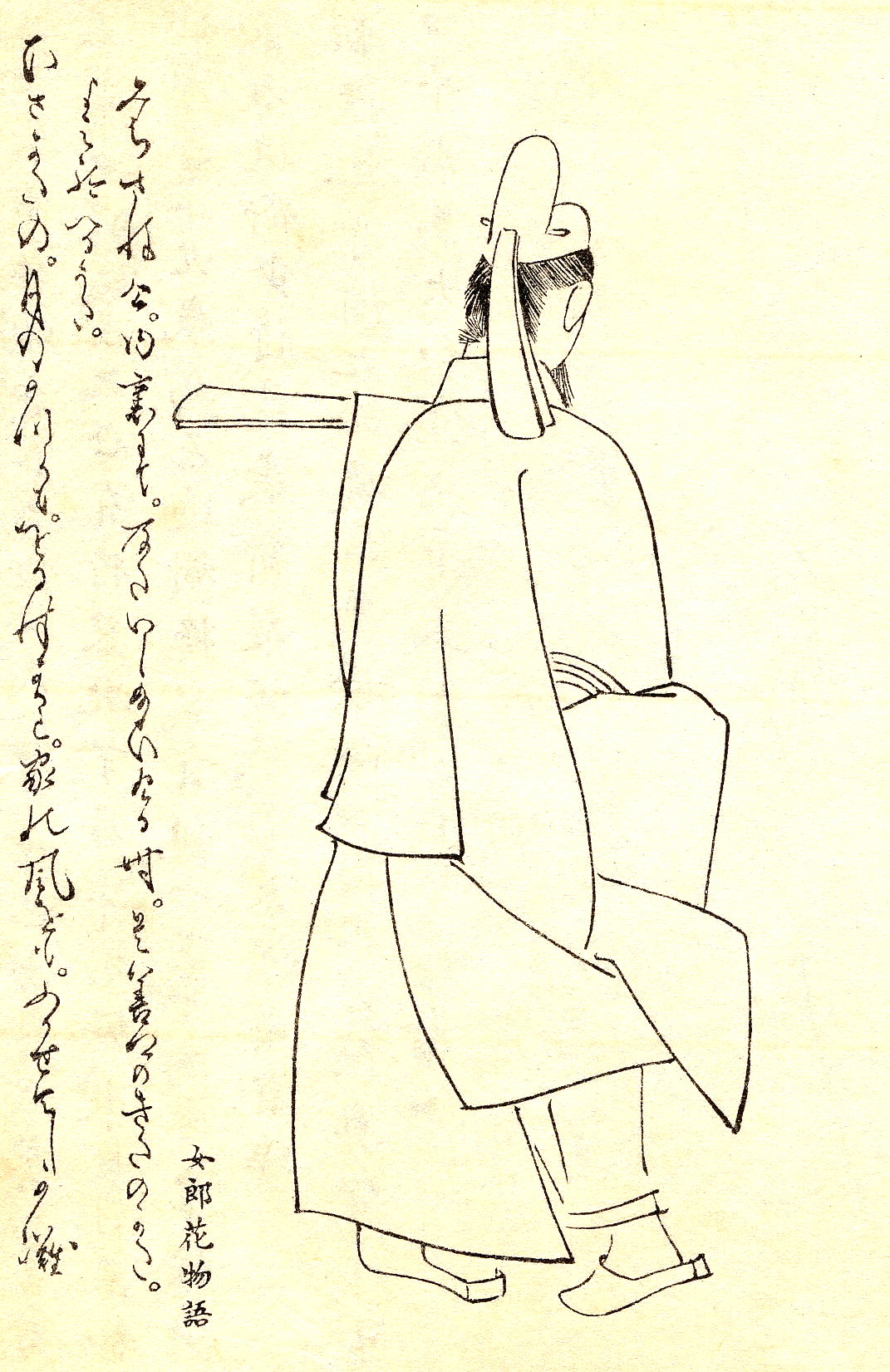
- Illustration by Kikuchi Yōsai, from Zenken Kojitsu
- Born: 812
- Died: 11 October 880
- Father: Sugawara no Kiyotomo
- Occupation: Poet, politician

Sugawara no Koreyoshi (菅原 是善; 812 – 11 October 880) was a Japanese aristocrat, poet and politician of the early Heian period. He was the fourth son of Sugawara no Kiyotomo. He reached the court rank of ju san-mi (従三位) and the position of sangi.

== Life ==
Koreyoshi was said to be intelligent and wise from a young age, reading books and composing poetry before Emperor Saga from the age of 11.

In 835 he became a top-ranked student of Chinese literature in the Daigaku-ryō, and in 839 he passed an examination for governmental service and was promoted a full three steps at once, from ju roku-i no ge (従六位下) to shō roku-i no jō (正六位上). He held administrative positions in the Daigaku-ryō and as chief draftsman and editor (大内記) in the Ministry of the Center, and in 844 was again promoted to ju go-i no ge (従五位下). In 845, he became a teacher in the Daigaku-ryō. While in this role, he also served as vice-governor of Echigo Province and Sanuki Province, and as a tutor to Crown Prince Michiyasu, the future Emperor Montoku.

In 850, Emperor Montoku took the throne, and Koreyoshi was promoted to shō go-i no ge (正五位下). Continuing his work as a teacher, he also worked as the head of the Daigaku-ryō, director of the Capital (左京大夫), and governor of Kaga, Mimasaka, Ise, and Bizen provinces. In 855, he was awarded the rank of ju shi-i no ge (従四位下).

In the court of Emperor Seiwa, Koreyoshi continued his role as a teacher and now governor of Harima Province, and was promoted to ju shi-i no jō (従四位上). Passing through a number of other positions, including as director of the Gyōbu-shō, he was in 870 appointed as vice-minister of the Shikibu-shō. In 872, he joined the ranks of the kugyō with a promotion to sangi. In 873 he was promoted to shō shi-i no ge (正四位下) and in 879 to ju san-mi (従三位). In 880, Koreyoshi died at the age of 69.

== Personality and works ==
The foremost scholar of his day, he was said to be friendly with the master poet Ono no Takamura and the court Confucian scholars Harusumi no Yoshitada and Ōe no Otondo. He counted many good officials and Confucian writers as his disciples. He was unconcerned with the mundanities of everyday life, instead reciting poems on the beauty of nature. As a believer in Buddhist teachings, he treated people with love, exhibited extreme filial piety, and disliked killing. On his deathbed, he requested only that a Buddhist memorial service be held for him in the early winter when the ume blossomed, and otherwise spoke not a word.

As tutor to the Emperors Montoku and Seiwa, Koreyoshi lectured on the Wen Xuan and the Book of Han, and the imperial edicts and prayers he drew up as chief draftsman still remain today. With Miyako no Yoshika and others he compiled the Nihon Montoku Tennō Jitsuroku. He also participated in the compilation of the Jōgan Kyakushiki (貞観格式), an amendment to the Ritsuryō legal system. Personally, he wrote texts including the Tōgū-setsuin (東宮切韻), Ginbō Rinritsu (銀牓輪律), Shūin Risshi (集韻律詩), and Kaibun Ruishū (会分類集). A collection of his poetry was called the Kanshōkō-shū (菅相公集).

== Genealogy ==
- Father: Sugawara no Kiyotomo
- Mother: Unknown
- Wife: third daughter of Tomo no Masanari (伴真成)
  - Son: Sugawara no Michiyoshi (菅原道善)
  - Son: Sugawara no Michinaka (菅原道仲)
  - Son: Sugawara no Michizane (菅原道真; 845-903)
- Other children:
  - Daughter: Sugawara no Ruishi (菅原類子), wife of Emperor Kōkō, mother of Minamoto no Junshi (源順子)
