= Nomi no Sukune =

Legendary sumo wrestler

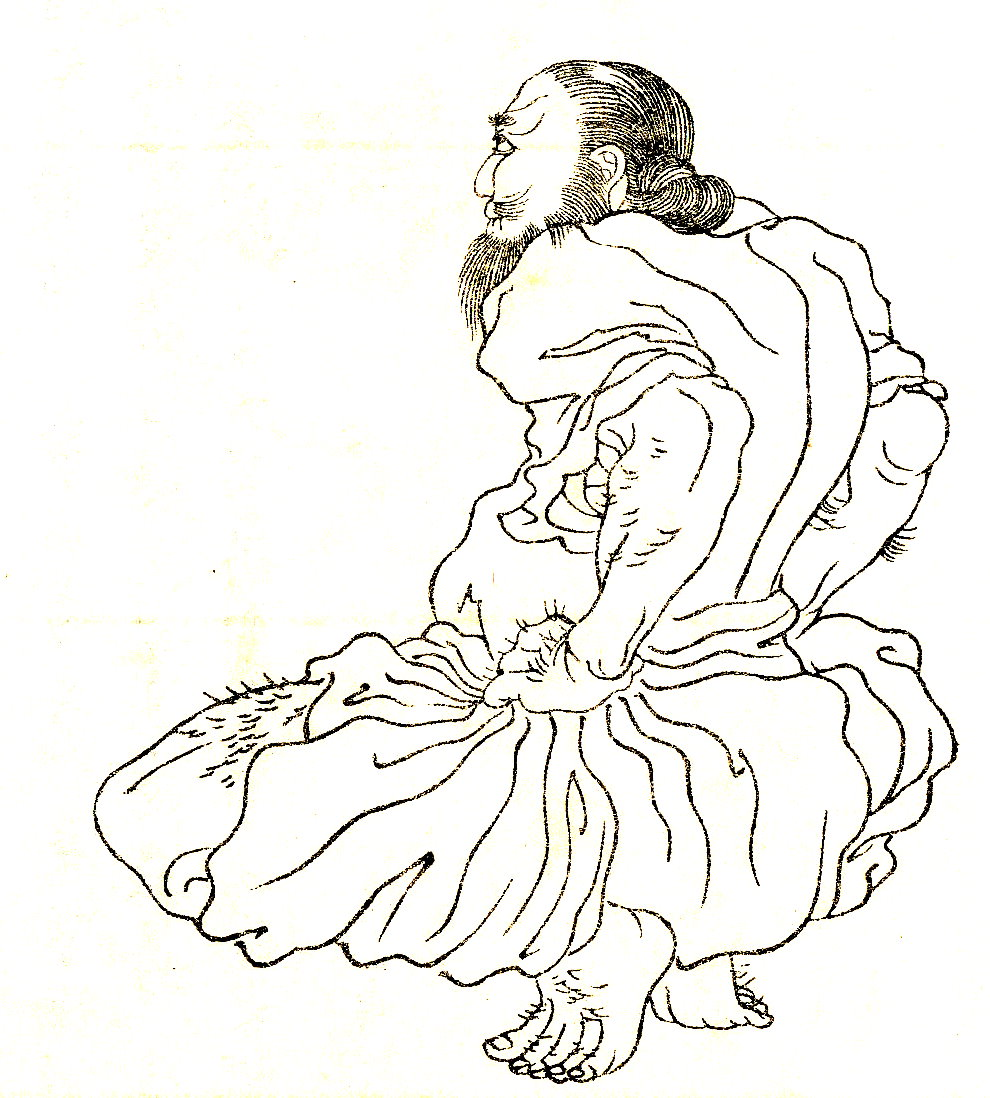
Nomi no Sukune by Kikuchi Yōsai

Nomi no Sukune (野見 宿禰) was a legendary figure in Japanese history who appears in the Nihon Shoki. He is regarded as the founder of sumo wrestling. He was the founder of the Haji clan.

== Life ==
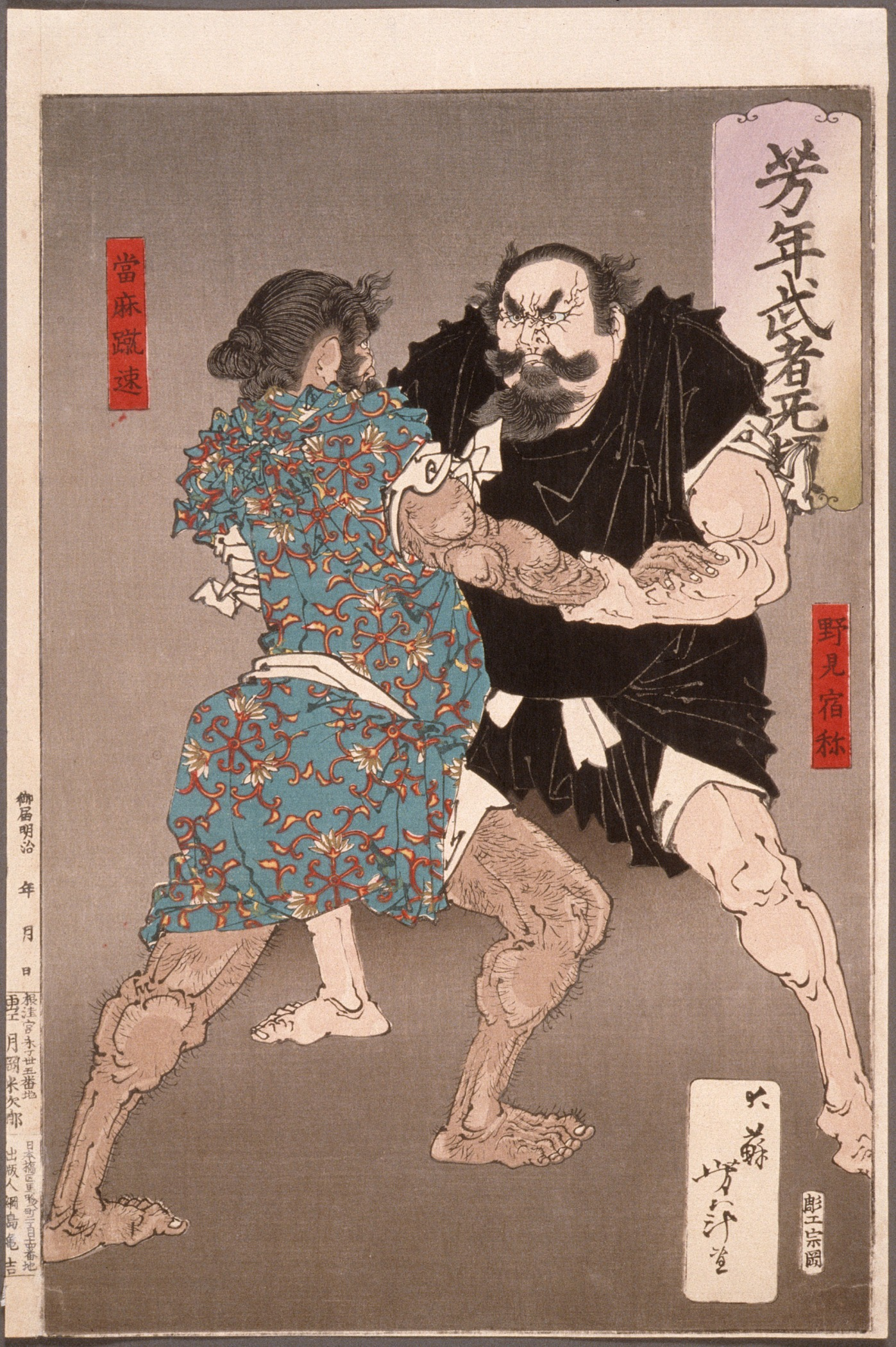
Nomi no Sukune wrestling with Taima no Kehaya (by Yoshitoshi)

Sukune is said to have lived during the reign of Emperor Suinin (29 BC – 70). Allegedly, in 23 B.C., the Emperor instructed Nomi no Sukune to deal with Taima no Kehaya (当麻蹴速) after he boasted that he was the strongest man "under the heavens". Nomi no Sukune engaged Taima no Kehaya in hand-to-hand combat and broke his ribs with one kick and his back with another, killing Taima no Kehaya. It was not modern sumo, but he is regarded as the creator of sumo.

He is believed to be an ancestor of Sugawara no Michizane, and the great-grandfather to Haji no Mino.

The emperor gave him the title of Haji (lit. Master of Pottery) after he and 300 potters crafted haniwa for the burial of Empress Hibasuhime.

== Legacy ==
A mural of him, removed from the old National Stadium in 2014, was put on display at the new stadium in 2019.
