= Poetic diary =

Japanese poetic genre

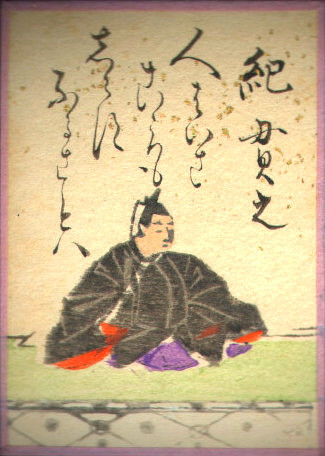
Ki no Tsurayuki

Poetic diary (歌日記, uta nikki) or Nikki bungaku (日記文学) is a Japanese literary genre, dating back to Ki no Tsurayuki's Tosa Nikki, compiled in roughly 935. Nikki bungaku is a genre including prominent works such as the Tosa Nikki, Kagerō Nikki, and Murasaki Shikibu Nikki. While diaries began as records imitating daily logs kept by Chinese government officials, private and literary diaries emerged and flourished during the Heian period (794–1192 AD).

The English term poetic diary was used by the Princeton University scholar/translator Earl Miner in his book, Japanese Poetic Diaries. Traditionally, composed of a series of poems held together by prose sections, the poetic diary has often taken the form of a pillow book or a travel journal. Since World War II, Beat Generation writers in the United States such as Gary Snyder, Jack Kerouac, Philip Whalen, and Joanne Kyger, as well as post-beat writers such as Andrew Schelling and Michael Rothenberg have studied and written in Western-style poetic diary form.

== History ==
Although scholars have found diaries dating back to the eighth century, most of those were mere records kept on daily matters of state. At that time, Japan looked to China as a model of culture and civilization and sought to copy Chinese official government diaries. Thus, early Japanese diaries were factual, written in Chinese characters, and influenced by official, male perspectives. Ki no Tsurayuki (c. 872 – 945), a famed poet and author, is credited with writing the first literary diary. His Tosa Nikki, written in 935, records his journey from Tosa in Shikoku to Kyoto through the alleged perspective of a female companion. Departing from the tradition of diaries written in Chinese, Tsurayuki used vernacular Japanese characters, waka poetry, and a female narrator to convey the emotional aspects of the journey.

The catalyst of the nikki bungaku tradition, however, is often attributed to Michitsuna's mother and her Kagerō Nikki. In this three part diary, she details the 21-year period between her courtship with Fujiwara no Kaneie and the beginning of her son's courtship. Expressing her personal feelings and exploring her marriage and social situation, Mother of Michitsuna pioneered a new wave of courtier women's kana literature.^{3} Other exemplars of Heian nikki bungaku include the Izumi Shikibu Nikki attributed to Izumi Shikibu, Murasaki Shikibu’s Murasaki Shikibu Nikki, Sugawara no Takasue no Musume’s Sarashina Nikki, and Fujiwara no Nagako’s Sanuki no Suke no Nikki.

Although there remains debate as to whether the nikki bungaku genre, with its emphasis on the diary as a literary art, continues to modern times, prominent examples of diary literature abound. The medieval period saw the rise of diaries such as Abutsu-ni’s Izayoi Nikki and travel diaries such as Matsuo Bashō's Oku no Hosomichi. In the modern period, confessional diaries such as Higuchi Ichiyō's Ichiyō Nikki and Nagai Kafu's Danchōtei Nichijō have gained in importance.

== General characteristics ==
Nikki bungaku as a term has only been around since the early 20th century and debate continues over strict delineation. However, three major characteristics of Japanese diary literature, though exceptions abound, are "the frequent use of poems, breaking away from the daily entry as a formal device, and a stylistic heightening." For example, Tsurayuki's Tosa Nikki contains fifty-seven waka. Revealing that the "events of the months and years gone by are only vague in memory, and often I have just written what I recall," Mother of Michitsuna also reveals that nikki are not limited to a daily log of events. On the third point, one can see a literary intent when comparing Bashō's Oku no Hosomichi with the log kept by his travel companion, Iwanami Sora. Other common observations include that diaries attempt at an "expression of the self" as opposed to a "search for the self." ^{5} For example, in writing her Kagero Nikki, Mother of Michitsuna claims a motive “to answer, should anyone ask, what is it like, the life of a woman married to a highly placed man?”^{4} Heian nikki in particular, according to scholar Haruo Shirane, are united in “the fact that they all depict the personal life of a historical personage.” Thematically, many diaries lay heavy emphasis on time and poetry.

== Influences ==
=== Influence of waka ===
The Heian period ushered a revival of Japanese classical poetry, waka, and native vernacular writing, kana. Waka, traditional Japanese thirty-one syllable poetry, was used for purposes ranging from official proclamations and poetry contests to private matters of courtship, and became crucial to success in the life of the aristocracy. Due to the importance of waka in communication, imperial waka anthologies such as the Kokinshū were compiled as poetic standards.

Nikki bungaku grew out of waka's rise in popularity. It has even been speculated that the Kagerō Nikki grew out of a request to compile a family poetry collection. Literary diaries from Heian and Muromachi periods included waka, and subsequent diaries were often associated with poetic forms such as haikai, haiku, and free verse. More than just developing from a poetic tradition, "it seems clear that poetry is conceived of as the most basic or purest literary form and that its presence, almost alone, is enough to change a journal of one’s life into an art diary."

== Influence of monogatari ==
Monogatari, or the Japanese narrative literature, and nikki bungaku greatly influenced each other. In fact, with some works having multiple names—Ise Monogatari or Zaigo Chūjō no Nikki and the Heichū Monogatari or Heichū Nikki—the line between the two genres was not always clear.

In writing her Kagerō Nikki, Mother of Michitsuna starts with her motive of realism in contrast to the monogatari she has read. Despite the overt rejection of the monogatari form, one can see the influence of the genre on diary literature in terms of style and paradigm; the discontent of the authors of both the Sarashina Nikki and Kagero Nikki seems to stem from the gap between their realities and life as idealized in monogatari. Lastly, perhaps the most famous of all monogatari, Genji Monogatari, delves into psychological aspects of its characters' private lives much like that of nikki bungaku.

== Influence on other literature ==
Mother of Michitsuna's Kagerō Nikki ushered in the second period of Heian literature and women's kana prose. Starting a tradition of psychological exploration and self-expression through Japanese vernacular, nikki bungaku not only gives modern readers an idea of historical events but also a view into the lives and minds of their authors. Literary diaries are also believed to have influenced Murasaki Shikibu's classic Genji Monogatari, arguably the first and one of the greatest court novels of all time. Lastly, though the definition is disputable, one can argue that the Japanese literary diary tradition continues to the present and remains an important element of culture and personal expression.

== See also ==
- The Pillow Book
- Kojijū-shū
- Nijōin no Sanuki Shū
- Akai-shū
- Saigū no Nyōgo Shū
- Okikaze-shū
