= Kakinomoto no Hitomaro =

Japanese poet

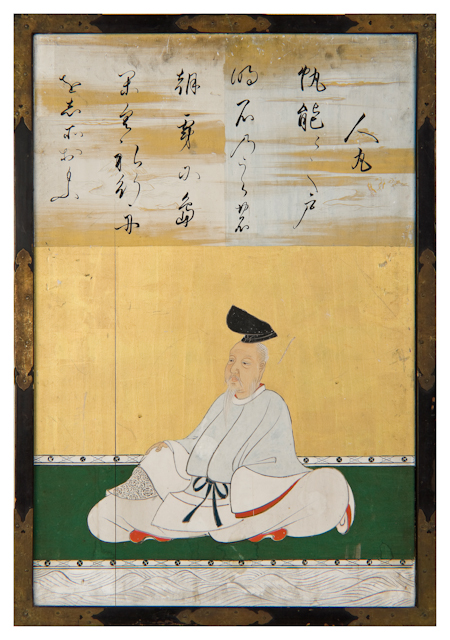
Kanō Tan'yū: Hito-maru (人丸), 1648

Kakinomoto no Hitomaro (柿本 人麻呂／人麿; Japanese pronunciation: [ka.kʲi.noꜜ.mo.to no (|) çi̥.to.ma.ɾo], c. 653–655 – c. 707–710) was a Japanese waka poet and aristocrat of the late Asuka period. He was the most prominent of the poets included in the Man'yōshū, the oldest waka anthology, but apart from what can be gleaned from hints in the Man'yōshū, the details of his life are largely uncertain. He was born to the Kakinomoto clan, based in Yamato Province (modern Nara prefecture), probably in the 650s, and likely died in Iwami Province (modern Shimane prefecture) around 709.

He served as court poet to Empress Jitō, creating many works praising the imperial family, and is best remembered for his elegies for various imperial princes. He also composed well-regarded travel poems.

He is ranked as one of the Thirty-six Poetry Immortals. Ōtomo no Yakamochi, the presumed compiler of the Man'yōshū, and Ki no Tsurayuki, the principal compiler of the Kokin Wakashū, praised Hitomaro as Sanshi no Mon (山柿の門) and Uta no Hijiri (歌の聖) respectively. From the Heian period on, he was often called Hito-maru (人丸). He has come to be revered as a god of poetry and scholarship, and is considered one of the four greatest poets in Japanese history, along with Fujiwara no Teika, Sōgi and Bashō.

== Life ==
=== Sources ===
The sole early source for the life of the poet Kakinomoto no Hitomaro is the Man'yōshū. His name does not appear in any of the official court documents, perhaps on account of his low rank.

=== Ancestry ===
Hitomaro was born into the Kakinomoto clan, an offshoot of the ancient Wani clan. Centred in the northeastern part of the Nara Basin, the Wani clan had furnished many imperial consorts in the fourth through sixth centuries, and extended their influence from Yamato Province to Yamashiro, Ōmi, Tanba and Harima provinces. Many of their clan traditions (including genealogies, songs, and tales) are preserved in the Nihon Shoki and, especially, the Kojiki. The Kakinomoto clan were headquartered in either Shinjō, Nara or, perhaps more likely, the Ichinomoto area of Tenri, Nara. The main Wani clan were also based in this area, so the Kakinomoto clan may have had a particularly close relationship with their parent clan. According to the Shinsen Shōjiroku, the clan's name derives from the persimmon (kaki) tree that grew on their land during the reign of Emperor Bidatsu.

The Kakinomoto clan had their hereditary title promoted from Omi to Ason in the eleventh month (see Japanese calendar) of 684. According to the Nihon Shoki, Kakinomoto no Saru, (Note: The Nihon Shoki spells this name 柿本臣猨, while the Shoku Nihongi spells it 柿本朝臣佐留, 臣 and 朝臣 reflecting the 684 change in title.) the probable head of the clan, had been among ten people appointed shōkinge, equivalent to Junior Fifth Rank, in the twelfth month of 681. These facts lead Watase to conjecture that the Kakinomoto clan may have had some literary success in the court of Emperor Tenmu. According to the Shoku Nihongi, Saru died in 708, having attained the Junior Fourth Rank, Lower Grade.

There are several theories regarding the relationship of this Kakinomoto no Saru to the poet Hitomaro, including the former being the latter's father, brother, uncle, or them being the same person. The theory that they were the same person has been advanced by Takeshi Umehara, but has little supporting evidence. While the other theories cannot be confirmed, it is certain that they were members of the same clan (probably close relatives), and were active at the same time. It is likely that their mutual activity at court had a significant effect on each other.

=== Birth and early life ===
The year in which he was born is not known, nor can much be said with certainty about any aspects of his life beyond his poetic activities. Watase tentatively takes Hitomaro as being 21 years old (by Japanese reckoning) between 673 and 675, which would put his birth between 653 and 655. (Note: The Yōrō Code puts the normal minimum age of people coming to court as High Chamberlain or Chamberlain of the Eastern Palace (東宮舎人) as 21.)

=== Emperor Tenmu's reign ===
The earliest dated work attributed to him in the Man'yōshū is his Tanabata poem (Man'yōshū 2033) composed in the ninth year of Emperor Tenmu's reign (680). The content of this poem reveals an awareness of the mythology that, according to the preface to the Kojiki (completed in 712) had begun to be compiled during Tenmu's reign. Watase also observes that Hitomaro's having composed a Tanabata poem means that he was probably attending Tanabata gatherings during this period. A significant number of poems in the Kakinomoto no Ason Hitomaro Kashū were apparently recorded by Hitomaro before 690, and are characteristic of court poetry, leading to the conclusion that he was active at court from the early part of Emperor Tenmu's reign. From this point he was active in recording and composing love poems at court.

Watase speculates that Hitomaro came to court in the service of the High Chamberlain in response to an imperial edict in 673.

Based on Hitomaro's poetic activities during Empress Jitō's reign, there are a few possibilities for where Hitomaro was serving at Tenmu's court. Watase presents three principal theories: first under the empress-consort Princess Uno-no-sarara (who later became Empress Jitō); second under Crown Prince Kusakabe; third in the palace of Prince Osakabe.

=== Reigns of Empress Jitō and Emperor Monmu ===
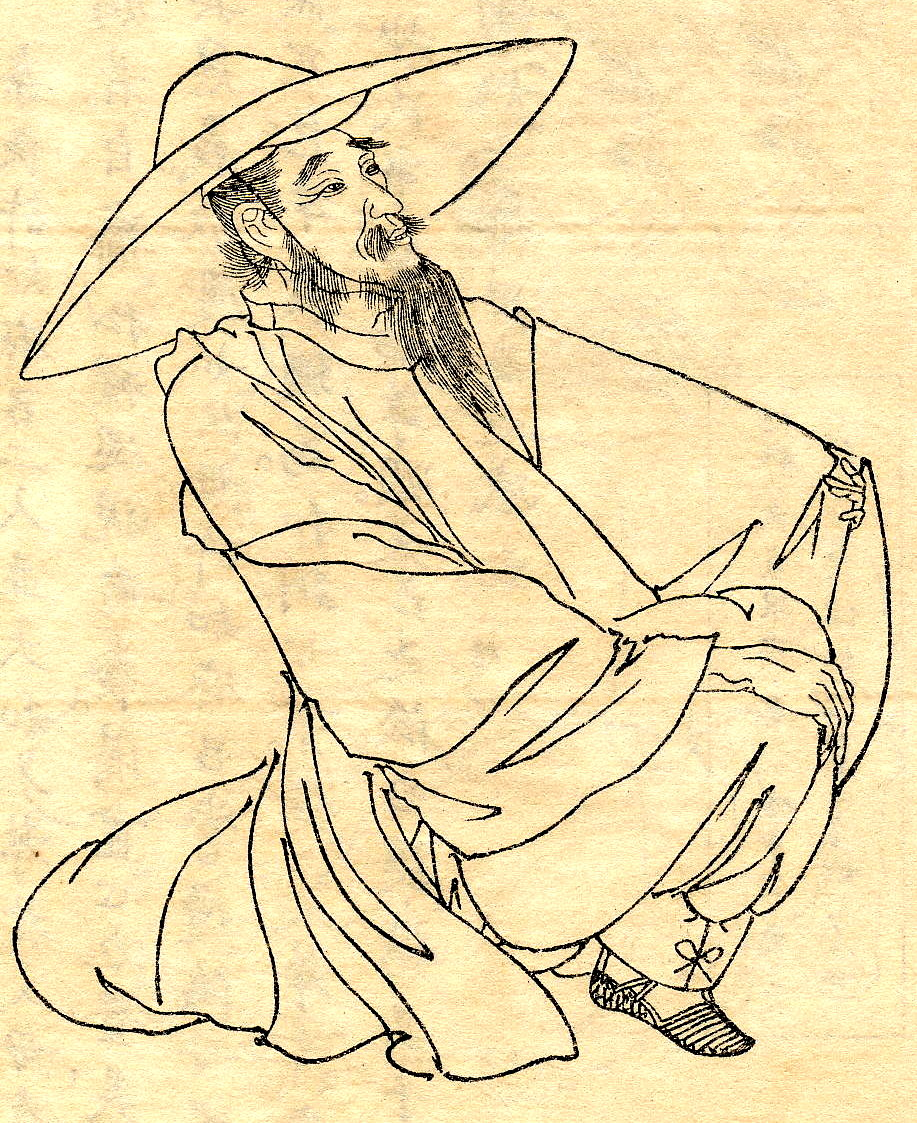
Hitomaro by Kikuchi Yōsai

Hitomaro acted as a court poet during the reigns of Empress Jitō and Emperor Monmu. In the fourth month of 689, Prince Kusakabe died, and Hitomaro composed an elegy commemorating the prince. He also composed an elegy for Princess Asuka, who died in the fourth month of 700, and a poem commemorating an imperial visit to Kii Province.

His poetic composition flourished during the period in which Empress Jitō was active (both during her reign and after her retirement). He composed poetry for numerous members of the imperial family, including the empress, Prince Kusakabe, Prince Karu, Prince Takechi, Prince Osakabe, Prince Naga, Prince Yuge, Prince Toneri, Prince Niitabe, Princess Hatsusebe and Princess Asuka. He apparently composed poetry in Yamato Province (his home), Yamashiro Province and Ōmi Province in the north, Kii Province in the south, Shikoku, Kyūshū and the Seto Inland Sea in the west, as well as Iwami Province in the northwest.

Susumu Nakanishi remarks that the fact that he did not apparently compose elegies for emperors themselves, and that most of his poems centre around princes and princesses, indicates that he was probably a writer affiliated with the literary circles that formed around these junior members of the imperial family.

=== Later life and death ===
The ordering of poems, and their headnotes, in volume 2 of the Man'yōshū, implies that Hitomaro died shortly before the moving of the capital to Nara in 710. He would have been in Iwami Province, at the Sixth Rank or lower.

The date, site and manner of his death are a matter of scholarly debate, due to some contradictory details that are gleaned from poems attributed to Hitomaro and his wife Yosami no Otome|Yosami (依羅娘子, Yosami no Otome). Taking Watase's rough dates, he would have been in his mid-fifties in 709, when Watase speculates he died. Mokichi Saitō postulated that Hitomaro died in an epidemic that swept Iwami and Izumo provinces in 707. Hitomaro's final poem gives the strong impression that he met his death in the mountains.

Man'yōgana	Modern Japanese text	Reconstructed Old Japanese	Modern Japanese	English translation
鴨山之 磐根之巻有 吾乎鴨 不知等妹之 待乍将有	鴨山の 岩根しまける 我をかも 知らにと妹が 待ちつつあるらむ	kamoyama no ipane si mak-yeru ware wo ka mo sira-nito imo ga matitutu ara-mu	Kamoyama no iwane shi makeru ware wo kamo shira ni to imo ga machitsutsu aruran	All unaware, it may be, That I lie in Kamoyama, Pillowed on a rock, She is waiting now—my wife— Waiting for my return.

Saitō was convinced he had located the site of the Kamoyama of the above poem and erected a monument there, but two poems by Yosami that immediately follow the above in the Man'yōshū suggest otherwise, as they mention "shells" (貝 kai) and a "Stone River" (石川 Ishikawa), neither of which seem likely in the context of Saitō's Kamoyama.

Man'yōgana	Modern Japanese text	Reconstructed Old Japanese	Modern Japanese	English translation
且今日且今日 吾待君者 石水之 貝尓交而 有登不言八方	今日今日と 我が待つ君は 石川の 貝に交じりて ありといはずやも	kyepu kyepu to wa ga matu kimi pa isikapa no kapi ni mazirite ari to ipa-zu ya mo	kyō kyō to a (Note: Keene (1999, p. 116) gives the reading "wa", but his source (Kojima, Kinoshita and Satake 1971, p. 182) gives the furigana reading "a", as do Tsuru and Moriyama (2012, p. 87).) ga matsu kimi wa Ishikawa no kai ni majirite ari to iwazu ya mo	Day in, day out, I wait for my husband— Alas! he lies buried, men say in the ravine of the Stone River.

The above-quoted translation is based on Saitō's interpretation of kai as referring to a "ravine" (峡). Other scholars take the presence of "shells" as meaning Hitomaro died near the mouth of a river where it meets the sea. (This interpretation would give the translation "Alas! he lies buried, men say, / With the shells of the Stone River.")

Man'yōgana	Modern Japanese text	Reconstructed Old Japanese	Modern Japanese	English translation
直相者 相不勝 石川尓 雲立渡礼 見乍将偲	ただに逢はば 逢ひかつましじ 石川に 雲立ち渡れ 見つつ偲はむ	tada no api pa api-katu masizi isikapa ni kumo tati-watare mitutu sinwopa-mu	tada ni awaba (Note: Tsuru and Moriyama (2012, p. 87) give the reading tada no ai wa.) ai katsu mashiji Ishikawa ni kumo tachiwatare mitsutsu shinowan	There can be no meeting Face to face with him. Arise, O clouds, Hover above Stone River That I may watch and remember.

There is no river named "Ishikawa" near the present Kamoyama; Saitō explained this as "Ishikawa" perhaps being an archaic name for upper part of another river.

An unknown member of the Tajihi clan (Note: Keene (1999, p. 117) refers to the poet as "Tajihi no Mabito", but Mabito/Mahito was a kabane held by all members of the Tajihi clan, and one of Keene's sources, Kojima, Kinoshita and Satake (1971, p. 182) states that the given name of the "Tajihi no Mahito" who composed this poem is unknown.) wrote a response to Yosami in the persona of Hitomaro, very clearly connecting Hitomaro's death to the sea.

Man'yōgana	Modern Japanese text	Reconstructed Old Japanese	Modern Japanese	English translation
荒浪尓 縁来玉乎 枕尓置 吾此間有跡 誰将告	荒波に 寄り来る玉を 枕に置き 我ここにありと 誰か告げけむ	aranami ni yori-kuru tama wo makura ni oki ware koko ni ari to tare ka tuge-na-mu	aranami ni yorikuru tama wo makura ni oki ware koko ni ari to tare ka tsugeken (Note: Tsuru and Moriyama (2012, p. 87) give the reading tare ka tsugenan.)	Who will tell her That I lie here, My head pillowed On the stones brought to shore By the rough waves?

== Works ==
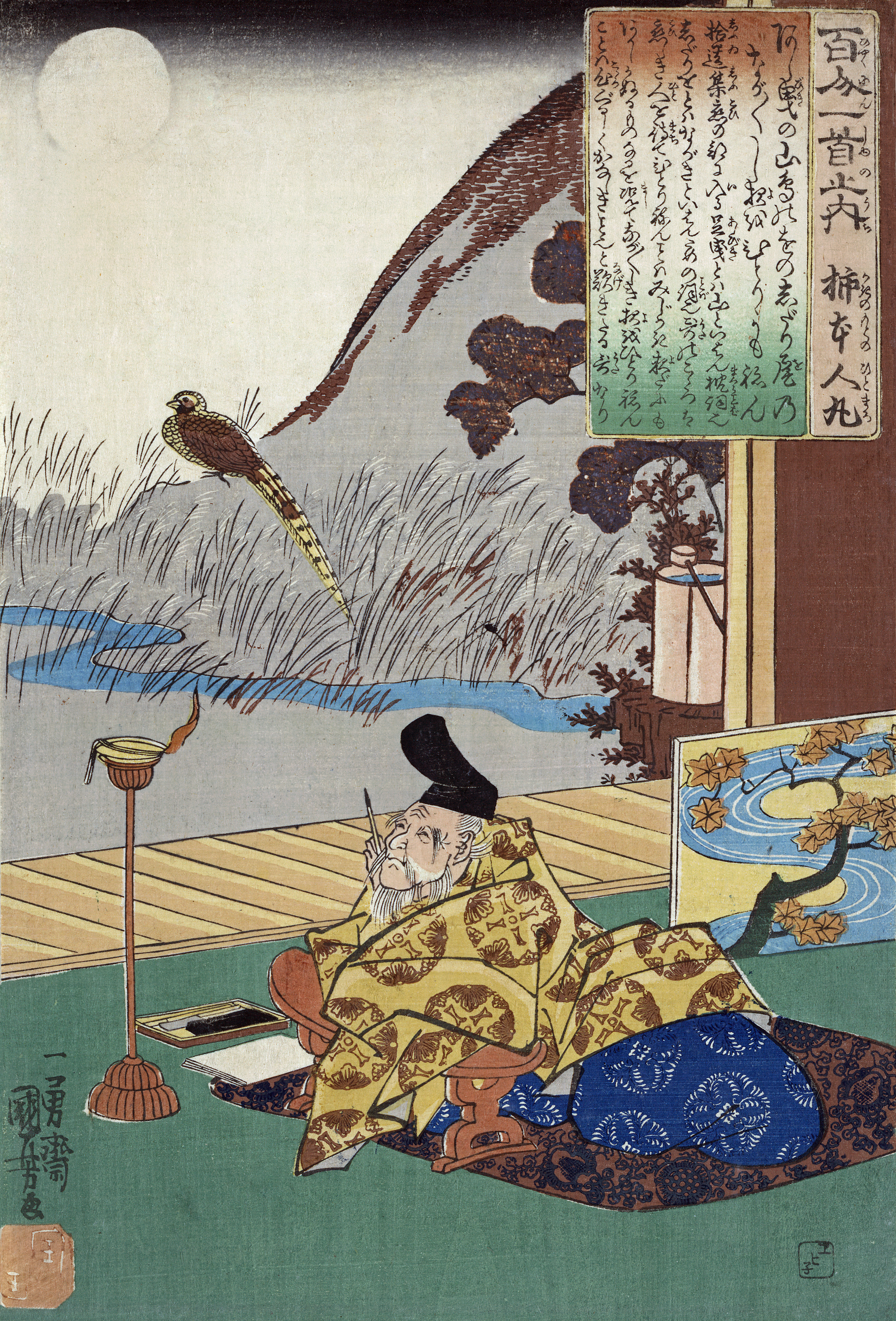
Ukiyo-e print by Utagawa Kuniyoshi that depicts Kakinomoto no Hitomaro

Hitomaro was a court poet during the reigns of Empress Jitō and Emperor Monmu, with most of his dateable poems coming from the last decade or so of the seventh century. He apparently left a private collection, the so-called Kakinomoto no Ason Hitomaro Kashū, which does not survive as an independent work but was cited extensively by the compilers of the Man'yōshū.

18 chōka and 67 tanka (of which 36 are envoys to his long poems) are directly attributed to him in the Man'yōshū. All are located in the first four books of the collection. Of these, six chōka and 29 tanka are classified as zōka (miscellaneous poems), three chōka and 13 tanka as sōmon (mutual exchanges of love poetry), and nine chōka and 25 tanka as banka (elegies). Of note is the fact that he contributed chōka to all three categories, and that he composed so many banka.

Broken down by topic, the above poems include:

- three chōka and five tanka about reigning emperors, such as hymns praising Empress Jitō's visits to Yoshino and Ikazuchioka, and poems lamenting the fallen Ōmi capital;
- seven chōka and 17 tanka about imperial princes and princesses such as his elegies for Prince Kusakabe, Prince Takechi, Princess Asuka and Prince Kawashima and his songs of praise for Prince Karu, Prince Osakabe, Prince Naga and Prince Niitabe;
- seven chōka and 28 tanka about court women, including the three tanka he composed on the court women accompanying Empress Jitō on her visit to Ise while he stayed in the capital, one chōka and eight tanka mourning Kibitsu no Uneme, Hijikata no Otome and Izumo no Otome, and a number of romantic exchanges with his wife and other lovers;
- one chōka and three tanka commemorating the bodies of dead people Hitomaro encountered;
- 14 tanka composed on travel topics that do not fit into any of the above categories (all of which also include travel poems).

From the above it can be said that Hitomaro's poetry was primarily about affairs of the court, but that he also showed a marked preference for poems on travel.

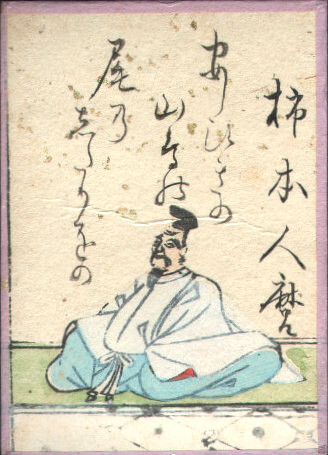
Kakinomoto no Hitomaro from Ogura Hyakunin Isshu

In addition to the 85 poems directly attributed to Hitomaro by the Man'yōshū, two chōka and three tanka in books 3 and 9 are said to be traditionally attributed to Hitomaro. Additionally, there is one Hitomaro tanka in book 15 said to have been recited in 736 by an envoy sent to Silla. Including these "traditional" Hitomaro poems, that gives 20 chōka and 71 tanka. It is quite possible that a significant number of these poems were incorrectly attributed to Hitomaro by tradition. In addition to Hitomaro's own compositions, there are also many poems said to have been recorded by him in his personal collection, the Kakinomoto no Asomi Hitomaro Kashū (柿本朝臣人麿歌集). The Hitomaro Kashū included 333 tanka, 35 sedōka, and two chōka. This adds up to a total figure of close to 500 poems directly associated with Hitomaro.

=== Characteristic style ===
Hitomaro is known for his solemn and mournful elegies of members of the imperial family, whom he described in his courtly poems as "gods" and "children of the sun". He incorporated elements of the national mythology seen in the Kojiki and Nihon Shoki and historical narrative in his poetry. While he is known for his poems praising the imperial family, his poetry is also filled with human sensitivity and a new, fresh "folkiness".

His lament for the Ōmi capital is noted for its vivid, sentimental descriptions of the ruins, while his elegy for Prince Takechi powerfully evokes the Jinshin War. His Yoshino and Samine Island poems praise the natural scenery and the divinity of the Japanese islands, and his Iwami exchange describes the emotions of being separated from the woman he loved. His romantic poems convey honest emotions, and his travel poems describe the mood of the courtiers on these trips. He expressed sorrow for the deaths of even random commoners on country paths and court women whose names he did not know.

Watase credits him with the creation of an ancient lyricism that expressed both human sentiment and sincere emotions across both his poems of praise and mourning.

== Reception ==
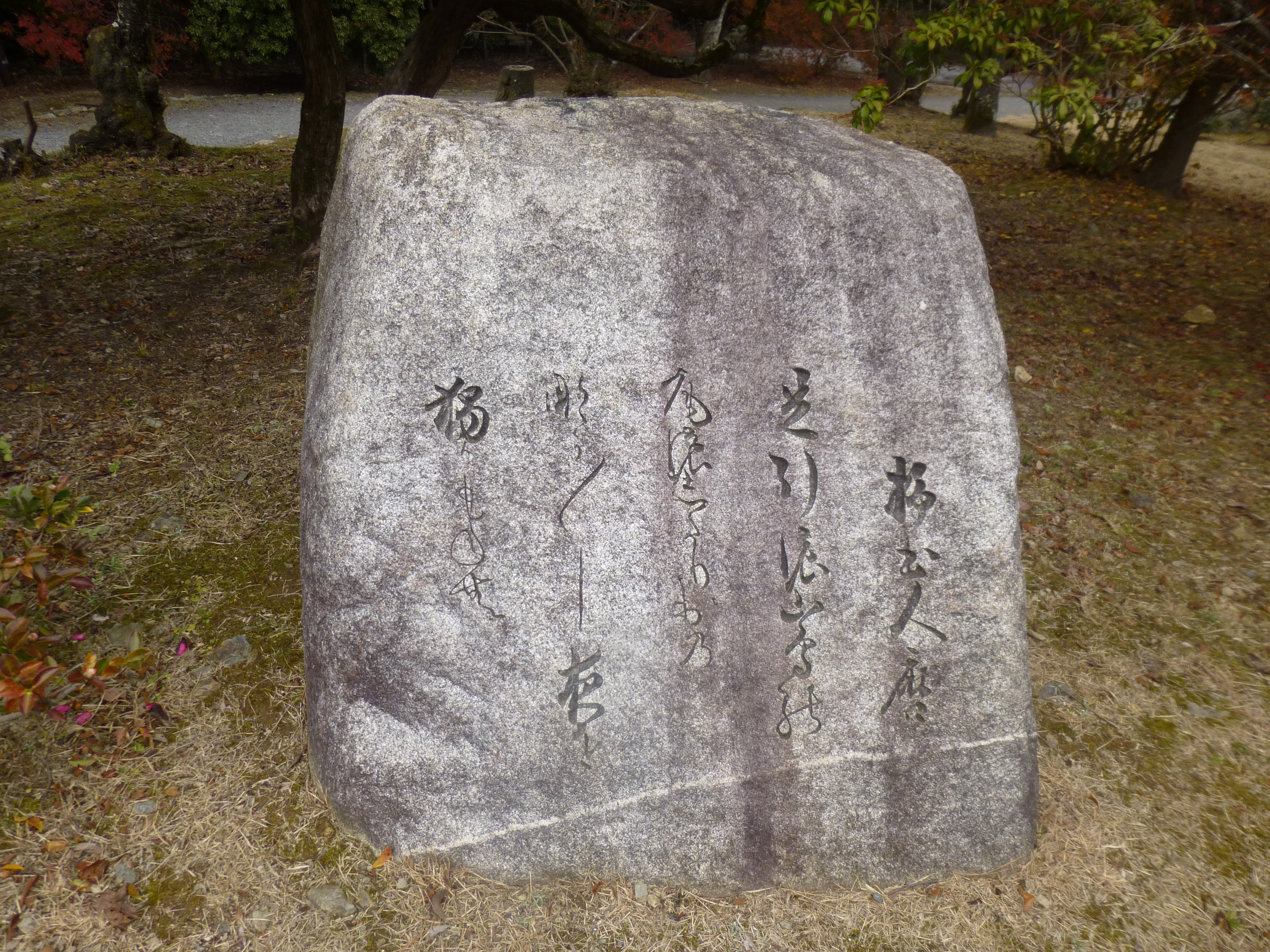
Hitomaro's contribution to the Ogura Hyakunin Isshu commemorated in an inscription near Mount Ogura, Kyoto

There is evidence that Hitomaro exerted direct influence on the poetry composed during his own time. For example, poems 171 through 193 of Book 1 of the Man'yōshū bear similarities to his work. It is generally accepted that the court poets of the following generation (the so-called "third period" of Man'yō poetry), including Yamabe no Akahito, were influenced by Hitomaro's courtly poems. Ōtomo no Yakamochi, a poet of the "fourth period" who probably had a hand in the final compilation of the collection, held Hitomaro in high regard, praising him as Sanshi no Mon (山柿の門). (Note: There are a number of conflicting theories as to the meaning of Sanshi, which is composed of two characters, 山 (which can also be read yama) and 柿 (which can also be read kaki). The general consensus is that the 柿 refers to Hitomaro, but there is debate over the identity of 山, which could refer to Yamabe no Akahito or to Yamanoue no Okura. One theory also proposes that 山柿 refers to only one person: Hitomaro. See Kawaguchi 1983, p. 453.) As discussed above, the death of Hitomaro appears to have already taken on some legendary characteristics.

In his Japanese preface to the tenth-century Kokin Wakashū, Ki no Tsurayuki referred to Hitomaro as Uta no Hijiri ("Saint of Poetry"). (Note: かのおほん時におほきみつのくらゐ、かきのもとのひとまろなむ歌のひじりなりける。) In the Heian period the practice of Hitomaru-eigu (人丸影供) also gained currency, showing that Hitomaro had already begun to be apotheosized. Hitomaro's divinity status continued to grow in the Kamakura and Muromachi periods. The Edo period scholars Keichū and Kamo no Mabuchi tended to reject the various legends about Hitomaro.

In Akashi, Hyōgo Prefecture there is a Kakinomoto Shrine dedicated to him, commemorating an early Heian belief that Hitomaro's spirit came to rest in Akashi, an area the historical Hitomaro probably visited multiple times.

Hitomaro is today ranked, along with Fujiwara no Teika, Sōgi and Bashō, as one of the four greatest poets in Japanese history.

== Works cited ==
- Akashi Tourism Association (2017). "Jinja/Bukkaku: Kakinomoto-jinja (神社・仏閣 柿本神社)". Akashi Tourism Association website. Akashi: Akashi Tourism Association. Archived from the original on 2017-11-07.
- Aso, Mizue (1998). Kakinomoto no Hitomaro Ronkō (zōho-kaitei-ban). Tokyo: Ōfū. ISBN 4-273-03030-6.
- Frellesvig, Bjarke; Horn, Stephen Wright; Russell, Kerri L.; Sells, Peter (2017). "The Oxford Corpus of Old Japanese". Oxford University Faculty of Oriental Studies website. Oxford University.
- Kawaguchi, Tsunetaka (1983). "Ōtomo no Yakamochi". Nihon Koten Bungaku Daijiten (in Japanese). Vol. 1. Tokyo: Iwanami Shoten. pp. 451–453. OCLC 11917421.
- Keene, Donald (1999) [1993]. A History of Japanese Literature, Vol. 1: Seeds in the Heart – Japanese Literature from Earliest Times to the Late Sixteenth Century (paperback ed.). New York, NY: Columbia University Press. ISBN 978-0-231-11441-7.
- Kojima, Noriyuki; Kinoshita, Masatoshi; Satake, Akahiro (1971). Nihon Koten Bungaku Zenshū Vol. 2; Man'yōshū Book I (in Japanese). Tokyo: Shogakukan. ISBN 4-09-657002-8.
- McMillan, Peter (2010). One Hundred Poets, One Poem Each. New York: Columbia University Press.
- Nakanishi, Susumu (1985). Man'yōshū Jiten (Man'yōshū zen'yakuchū genbun-tsuki bekkan) (paperback ed.). Tokyo: Kōdansha. ISBN 4-06-183651-X.
- Shirane, Haruo (2012). Traditional Japanese Literature: An Anthology, Beginnings to 1600 (Abridged Edition) (paperback ed.). New York, NY: Columbia University Press. ISBN 978-0-231-15731-5.
- Tsuru, Hisashi; Moriyama, Takashi (2012). Man'yōshū (in Japanese). Tokyo: Ōfū. ISBN 978-4-273-00019-6.
- Watase, Masatada (1983). "Kakinomoto no Hitomaro". Nihon Koten Bungaku Daijiten (in Japanese). Vol. 1. Tokyo: Iwanami Shoten. pp. 586–588. OCLC 11917421.
- Werneburg, Ingmar (2023). Als Kaiserin Jito nach Yoshino ging. Gedichte nach Kakinomoto no Hitomaro (free poetic adaptation of all works of Hitomaro and of the Hitomaro-collection with a comprehensive commentary) (in German) (1 ed.). Tübingen: Scidinge Hall Verlag. pp. 1–218. ISBN 978-3-947020-20-1.
