= Shihon-ji =

Coordinates: 34.6202°N 135.8343°E

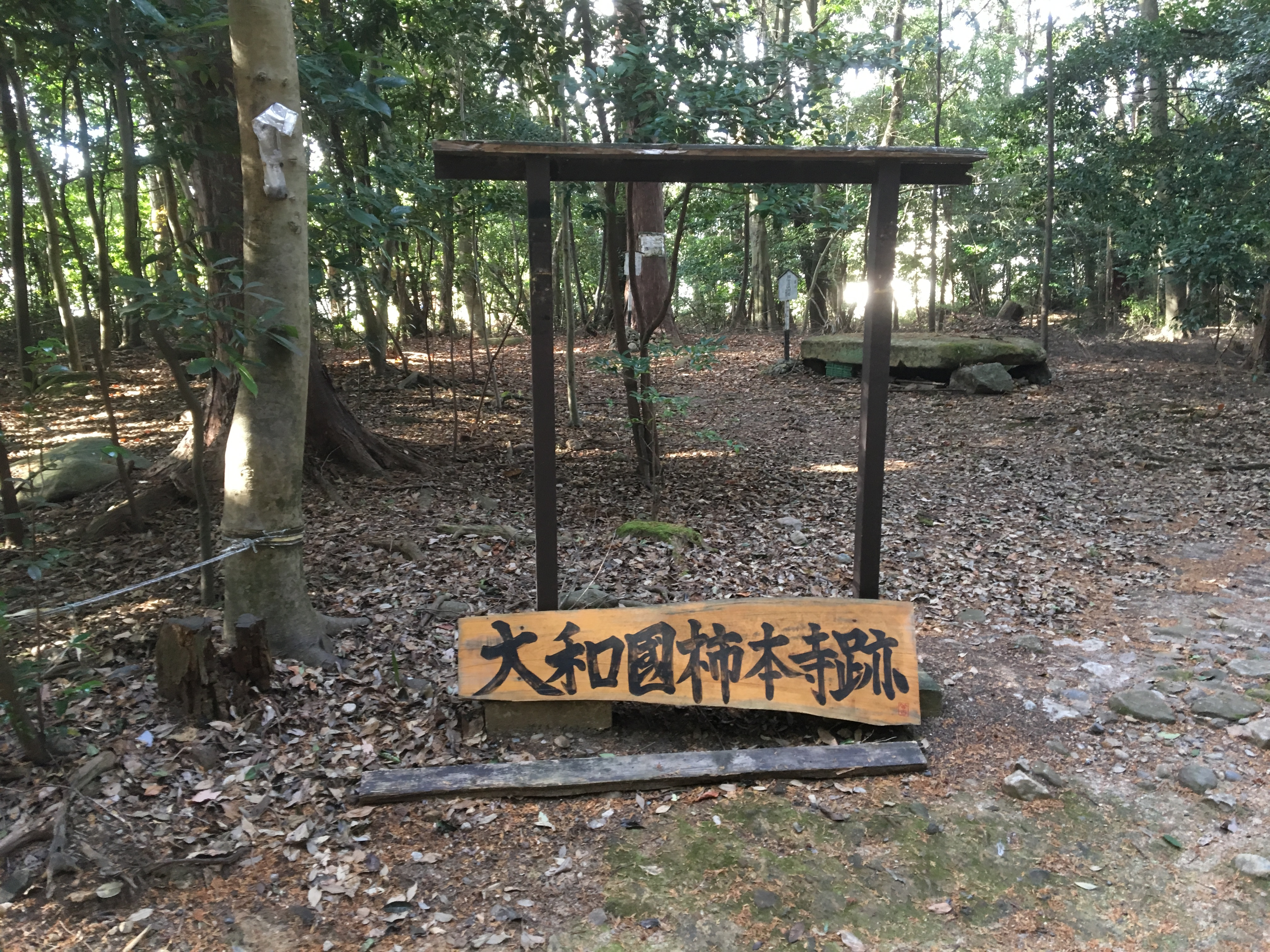

Shihon-ji (柿本寺) is a ruined temple (廃寺) in Tenri, Nara, Japan.

== History ==
Shihon-ji was the uji-dera (氏寺, "family temple") of the Kakinomoto clan. It is supposedly the final resting place of the remains of the poet Kakinomoto no Hitomaro and so became a focal point for veneration of him once he began to be worshiped as a god of poetry. A stone tablet commemorating Hitomaro at this spot is mentioned in the Fujiwara no Kiyosuke Kashū (藤原清輔家集), which was likely compiled in the late 12th century.

In 1337 (Kenmu 4), in the early Nanboku-chō period, the army of the Northern Court took up camp in the temple grounds and did battle with the Southern Court's forces. Around the same period, the Shihon-gū Mandala (柿本宮曼荼羅 Shihon-gū Mandara) was produced here. It is now in the holdings of the Yamato Bunkakan (大和文華館) and is an Important Cultural Property.

It moved at some point, the date of which is uncertain, but it was likely established at its present location within the Muromachi period. Until the Edo period it flourished as a place of learning for Buddhist monks practicing waka composition and tea ceremony. In 1732 (Kyōhō 17), the monks of the temple and the physician Morimoto Munenori (森本宗範) erected a stone tablet (歌塚 utazuka) in the temple grounds.

It was abandoned at the beginning of the Meiji period.
