= Nijō Tamefuyu =

Japanese courtier and poet (d. 1335)

Nijō Tamefuyu (二条為冬, ?–1335), also known as Fujiwara no Tamefuyu (藤原為冬), was a Japanese courtier and waka poet of the late Kamakura period.

He was briefly considered as a possible compiler for the Shokugoshūi Wakashū an imperial anthology of waka, but was opposed by his nephew Nijō Tamesada. Twenty of his poems were eventually included in this and later imperial anthologies, with more in private collections.

He died in 1335 fighting against the winning army of Ashikaga Takauji at the Battle of Takenoshita.

== Biography ==
=== Ancestry and birth ===
Tamefuyu's year of birth is unknown. He was the youngest child of Nijō Tameyo, Tameyo himself being a son of Nijō Tameuji, a grandson of Fujiwara no Tameie, and a great-grandson of Fujiwara no Teika.

=== Political career ===
At the height of his political career, he held the position of Middle Captain of the Left (左中将).

=== Death ===
He died on the twelfth day of the twelfth month of Kenmu 2 (1335/1336). He had been in the army sent to hunt down and kill Ashikaga Takauji, but lost at the Battle of Takenoshita and committed suicide.

== Name ==
He was a member of the Nijō branch of the Fujiwara clan, so is known as both Nijō Tamefuyu and Fujiwara no Tamefuyu.

== Poetry ==
Tamefuyu participated in a number of formal waka poetry gatherings, including at the imperial palace, beginning around 1323, when he was present at the Kameyama-dono shichihyaku-shu (亀山殿七百首).

In the seventh month of 1324, when Nijō Tamefuji suddenly dropped out as a compiler of the Shokugoshūi Wakashū, his father Tameyo attempted to replace him with Tamefuyu, who was then probably only in his twenties, but was overruled by Nijō Tamesada.

20 of his poems are included in imperial collections from the Shokugoshūi Wakashū on. Several of his poems are also known from private collections (私撰集 shisenshū), such as the Shoku Gen'yō Wakashū (続現葉和歌集) and the Rin'ei Wakashū (臨詠和歌集). There is a work known as the Zen-sangi Tamefuyu-kyō Shū (前参議為冬卿集, literally "Former Councilor Tamefuyu Collection"), but despite its name this is actually a selection of poems taken from the Waka Dairin Gushō (和歌題林愚抄) rather than a personal anthology compiled by Tamefuyu himself.

== Works cited ==
- "Nijō Tameyo" 二条為世. Bijutsu Jinmei Jiten (in Japanese). Shibunkaku. 2016.
- Hosoya, Naoki (1983). "Nijō Tamefuyu". Nihon Koten Bungaku Daijiten 日本古典文学大辞典 (in Japanese). Vol. 4. Tokyo: Iwanami Shoten. p. 596. OCLC 11917421.
- Inoue, Muneo (1994). "Fujiwara no Tameyo" 二条為世. Encyclopedia Nipponica (in Japanese). Shogakukan.
