= Fujiwara no Akitsuna =

Japanese nobleman and waka poet (died c. 1105)

Fujiwara no Akitsuna (藤原 顕綱; dates uncertain, ? – c. 1103–1107) was a Japanese nobleman and waka poet of the Heian period.

== Life ==
Fujiwara no Akitsuna was a son of Fujiwara no Kanetsune, a member of the Michitsuna lineage (道綱流) of the Northern Branch of the Fujiwara clan. His mother was Ben no Menoto, a daughter of Fujiwara no Masatoki (藤原順時), the governor of Kaga Province. The year of his birth is uncertain.

He was the adoptive father of Arisuke (有佐), a son of Emperor Go-Sanjō. His other children included Michitsune (道経), the governor of Izumi Province, Kenshi (ja), the wet nurse of Emperor Horikawa, and Nagako, the author of the Sanuki-no-suke Nikki. He was also related by marriage to Fujiwara no Michitoshi and Fujiwara no Akisue.

During the Kanji era (1087–1094) he became the governor of Sanuki Province, earning him the nickname Sanuki no Nyūdō (讃岐入道). He served in positions such as governor of Tanba Province and governor of Izumi Province, and by the end of his career was of Senior Fourth Rank, Lower Grade.

He probably took the tonsure in Kōwa 2 (1100).

It is uncertain when he died. Sonpi Bunmyaku says he died on the 27th day of the sixth month of Kōwa 5 (1103), at age 75 (by Japanese reckoning), but his poetry appears in the record of the Sakon no Gon-Chūjō Toshitada Ason-ke Uta-awase (左近権中将俊忠朝臣家歌合), which took place the following year. Boku Hagitani places his death in the summer of Kajō 2 (1107).

== Poetry ==
The first uta-awase contest in which he took part was the Jōryaku Ninen Dairi Uta-awase (承暦二年内裏歌合) in Jōryaku 2 (1078). He took part in the poetic gatherings:

- the Kaya no In-dono Shichiban Uta-awase (高陽院殿七番歌合) in the eighth month of Kanji 8 (1094);
- the Ikuhō Mon'in Senzai-awase (郁芳門院前栽合) in the eighth month of Kahō 2 (1095); and
- the Sakon no Gon-Chūjō Toshitada Ason-ke Uta-awase in the fifth month of Chōji 1 (1104).

He also held poetic gatherings at his own residence.

According to the Fukuro-zōshi, he was engaged in copying the Man'yōshū, and that he came into possession of the Yōmei-in text (陽明院本 Yōmei'in-bon) of the Kokinshū, penned by the compiler Ki no Tsurayuki.

Twenty-five of his poems were included in imperial anthologies, including the Goshūishū. He left a personal collection, the Akitsuna Ason Shū. Among his most famous works is the following poem, which was submitted to the Sakon no Gon-Chūjō Toshitada Ason-ke Uta-awase and included in the first book of love poems in the Shikashū:

Japanese text	Romanized Japanese	English translation
くれなゐの こぞめの衣 うへに着む 恋の涙の 色隠るやと	kurenai no kozome no koromo ue ni kin koi no namida no iro kakuru ya to
