= Yakushiji Kin'yoshi =

Yakushiji Kin'yoshi (薬師寺 公義, c. 1308–1311 – c. 1381–1384) was a Japanese waka poet and samurai of the Nanbokuchō period. He was also known as Jirō Saemon no Shō, and his dharma name was Genka.

== Life ==
The birth date of the samurai and waka poet Yakushiji Kin'yoshi is unknown, but he was likely born in or around the Enkyō period (1308–1311).

He was variously reported in the Chokusen Sakusha Burui (勅撰作者部類) and the Yakushi-ji Keizu (薬師寺系図) as the son of Tachibana no Noritaka (橘範隆) and Koyama Sadamitsu (小山貞光), respectively. He was a retainer of Kō no Moronao, but Book 29 of the Taiheiki indicates that he ignored remonstrations and took the tonsure. After entering Buddhist orders he took the dharma name Genka (元可). He also used the nickname Jirō Saemon no Shō (次郎左衛門尉) and Jirō Saemon (次郎左衛門).

His death date is unknown, but he likely died in or before the Eitoku period (1381–1384), in his seventies.

== Poetry ==
He studied waka under the poet Nijō Tamesada. Sixty of his poems were included in court anthologies from the Shinsenzai-shū on. His personal anthology, the Kin'yoshi-shū (公義集, also known as the Genka-hōshi Shū 元可法師集), includes over 310 poems. (Note: This work is apparently unrelated to the almost identically named Genka-shū (元可集) in the holdings of the Ise Grand Shrine Archives (神宮文庫 Jingū Bunko).) The Kin'yoshi-shū was compiled by Kin'yoshi himself, during the Kōryaku period (1379–1381).

His compositions were criticized by Imagawa Ryōshun in his work Rakusho Roken (落書露顕) for being hummed by people.
