= Kojijū =

Japanese noblewoman and waka poet

Kojijū (小侍従; 1121–1202 CE) (also Matsuyoi no Kojijū) was a waka poet and Japanese noblewoman active in the late Heian period.

Her father was Ki no Mitsukiyo, and her mother was the poet Hanazono Sadaijinke no Kodaishin.

As a lady-in-waiting, she served the twice-empress Fujiwara no Tashi (who was wife, successively, to Emperor Konoe and Emperor Nijō), as well as in the court of the retired Emperor Takakura. Additionally, she took part in poetry contests organized by Emperor Go-Toba. During this time, courtiers were expected to be skilled poets, and a great deal of court life involved composing and exchanging poetry, as well as participating in poetry contests. Kojijū is designated a member of the Female Thirty-Six Immortals of Poetry (女房三十六歌仙, Nyōbō Sanjūrokkasen). She left a private collection of poems titled the Kojijū-shū.

Contemporaries noted her for her especial skill in composing poems that exactly suited the situation, particularly when writing a verse as a response to someone else's verse.

In 1179, she became a Buddhist nun.

== Works cited ==
- Morimoto, Motoko (1983). "Kojijū-shū". Nihon Koten Bungaku Daijiten 日本古典文学大辞典 (in Japanese). Vol. 2. Tokyo: Iwanami Shoten. pp. 607–608. OCLC 11917421.
