= Kakinomoto Shrine (Akashi) =

Shinto shrine in Akashi, Hyogo, Japan

Coordinates: 34°39′01″N 135°00′06″E

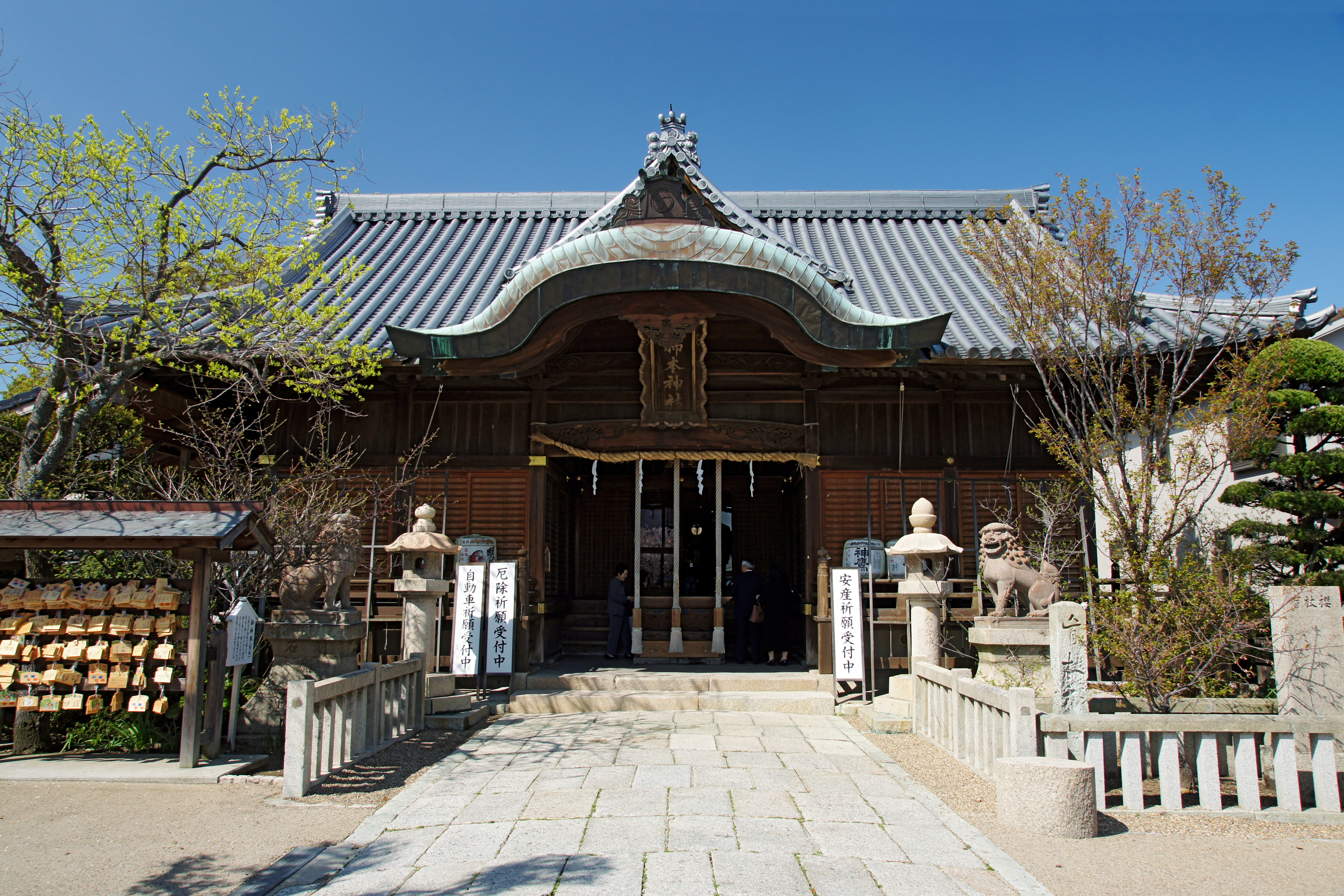

Religion
- Affiliation: Shinto
- Deity: Kakinomoto no Hitomaro
- Interactive map of Kakinomoto Shrine

Kakinomoto Shrine (柿本神社 Kakinomoto-jinja) is a Shinto shrine in Akashi, Hyōgo. It is also referred to as Hitomaru-san.

The shrine's principal deity is Kakinomoto no Hitomaro, a historical figure who is reputed to have passed through the Akashi area during his life, and who was deified in the centuries following his death, as a god of literature, scholarship, fire safety, and childbirth.

According to tradition, the shrine was founded in 887 by the monk Kakushō, in the grounds of the Gesshō-ji temple. It moved to its current location to accommodate the construction of Akashi Castle.

== Enshrined deities ==
The shrine's principal deity is Kakinomoto no Hitomaro, a god of waka poetry and, by extension, scholarship and literature, but also, by way of a pair of puns on his name, fire safety (火止まる hi-tomaru = "fire stop") and childbirth (人生る hito-umaru = "person is born")

According to tradition, Hitomaro passed through the Akashi area multiple times while travelling between his home in Yamato Province and his assigned district in Iwami Province, and a poem he wrote on Akashi Strait survives.

== History ==
The history of the shrine is said to begin in 887 (Ninna 3), when Kakushō (覚証), a Buddhist monk of the temple Gesshō-ji, speculated that Hitomaro's spirit had come to rest in Akashi and constructed a small shrine at the back of his temple. Both the temple and the shrine were moved to their current location to accommodate the construction of Akashi Castle. In 1723 (Kyōhō 8) the shrine was granted the first rank in Japan's Shinto Shrine ranking system and the shrine's deity was given the title (ja) Kakinomoto Dai-myōjin (柿本大明神).

== Name ==
The shrine is familiarly referred to by local people with the nickname Hitomaru-san (人丸さん).

== Monuments and architecture ==
In the shrine grounds is a monument constructed on the order of Matsudaira Nobuyuki, inscribed with a 1,712-character biography of Hitomaro.

== Works cited ==
- Akashi Tourism Association (2017). "Jinja/Bukkaku: Kakinomoto-jinja (神社・仏閣 柿本神社)". Akashi Tourism Association website. Akashi: Akashi Tourism Association. Archived from the original on 2017-11-07.
