= Saigū no Nyōgo Shū =

The Saigū no Nyōgo Shū (斎宮女御集), also known as the Saigū-shū (斎宮集) is a Japanese anthology of waka poetry. It is the personal anthology (kashū) of Princess Kishi, who was also known as Saigū no Nyōgo. It is one of the Sanjūroku-nin Shū (三十六人集).

== Compiler and date ==
There are a number of possibilities as to how the Saigū no Nyōgo Shū came about. The scholar Motoko Morimoto, in her article on the anthology for the Nihon Koten Bungaku Daijiten, presents the following theory:

- Text 1 was created when the court ladies attached to Princess Kishi collected together her poems after her death in 985.
- The poetic exchanges between the princess and Emperor Murakami that were recorded after the latter's death in 967 were then incorporated into Text 1. This was Text 2-A.
- Poems the princess exchanged with various individuals were incorporated into Text 1 independently, creating Text 2-B.
- Text 3 was compiled from the above, with the ordering and text of the poems being edited.

Based on this theory, the 102-poem Shōho-ban Kasen Kashū-bon text (see Textual tradition and modern editions, below) would be Text 1, while the 163-poem Archives and Mausolea Department text would be Text 2-A. The fragmentary Kojima-gire would be Text 2-B., and the 265-poem Nishihonganji-bon Sanjūroku-nin Shū text would be Text 3.

== Contents ==
The poems included in the collection date from a 37-year period between 948, when Princess Kishi came to court, and 985, immediately after her death.

The anthology's contents can be divided into two parts: the first including poems generally composed up to the death of Emperor Murakami in 967, the second centring on her second journey to Ise in 975. The first part is noted for poems addressing the joys and sorrows of the life of a lady in the court of Emperor Murakami, while the second part is known for its poems on reaching Ise and dwelling there.

The work illustrates the princess's associations with many people in the Heian Capital.

== Textual tradition and modern editions ==
Two early-twelfth century manuscripts, the Nishihonganji-bon (西本願寺本) and the Kojima-gire (小島切), are extant. Facsimile editions of both were produced in the mid-1960s. The Nishihonganji-bon is part of the Nishihonganji-bon Sanjūroku-nin Shū. There is also a Shōho-ban Kasen Kashū-bon text, and one in the possession of the Archives and Mausolea Department of the Imperial Household Agency.

Modern printed editions include the Gunsho Ruijū, Shoku Kokka Taikan (a supplement to the Kokka Taikan) and Kokka Taikei Vol. 12.

== Works cited ==
- Morimoto, Motoko (1983). "Saigū no Nyōgo Shū". Nihon Koten Bungaku Daijiten 日本古典文学大辞典 (in Japanese). Vol. 3. Tokyo: Iwanami Shoten. p. 14. OCLC 11917421.
