= Taikan =

Taikan may refer to:

- Yokoyama Taikan (1868 – 1958), a Japanese painter
- Kokka Taikan, a compilation of Japanese waka poetry
- Taikan Range, a mountain chain in the Russian Far East
