= Nijō Tamemichi =

Japanese courtier and poet (1271–1299)

Nijō Tamemichi (二条為道 or 二条為通, 1271–1299), also known as Fujiwara no Tamemichi (藤原為道), was a Japanese courtier and waka poet of the late Kamakura period.

== Biography ==
=== Sources ===
Sources for the life of Nijō Tamemichi include the anthologies collecting his poems themselves such as the Shinshūi Wakashū, the Shokusenzai Wakashū, the Dairi Gyoe Waka (内裏御会和歌) and the Tōyōshū (藤葉集), as well as historical and genealogical works such as Sonpi Bunmyaku, and diaries such as Towazugatari and Hare no Gyoe Burui-ki (晴御会部類記).

=== Ancestry and birth ===
Tamemichi was born in 1271. His father was Nijō Tameyo, and his mother was a daughter of Kamo no Ujihisa (賀茂氏久). He was Tameyo's eldest son.

=== Political career ===
At the height of his political career, he had attained the Senior Fourth Rank, Lower Grade, and held the position of Provisional Middle Captain of the Left (権左中将). In 1289 he was given the additional title of Provisional Vice-Governor of Bitchū Province (備中権介 Bichū no gon-no-suke), and in 1293 he received the further additional titles of Provisional Assistant Master of the Consort's Household (中宮権亮 chūgū gon-no-suke) and Provisional Vice-Governor of Mino Province (美濃権介 Mino no gon-no-suke)

=== Death ===
He died on the fifth day of the fifth month of Shōan 1 (1299), at the age of 29 by Japanese reckoning.

=== Descendants ===
He was the father of Nijō Tamesada, who became the ancestor of the later main line of the house of Nijō.

== Name ==
He was a member of the Nijō branch of the Fujiwara clan, so is known as both Nijō Tamemichi and Fujiwara no Tamemichi. The kanji for Tamemichi is conventionally written "為道", but some sources such as the Sonpi Bunmyaku give "為通". He may have composed one of his works under the pseudonym "Reizei Harin" (冷泉羽林).

== Poetry ==
Tamemichi composed waka poetry in the style of the Nijō poetic school. He took part in multiple poetry contests organized by the court. Over sixty of his poems were included in imperial anthologies from the Shingosen Wakashū on.

He is thought to have also been the composer of the banquet song Natori-gawa no koi (名取河恋), under the pseudonym "Reizei Harin".

== Works cited ==
- Fukuda, Hideichi (1983). "Nijō Tamemichi". Nihon Koten Bungaku Daijiten 日本古典文学大辞典 (in Japanese). Vol. 4. Tokyo: Iwanami Shoten. p. 596. OCLC 11917421.
