= Akai-shū =

Japanese waka anthology

The Akai Shū (亜槐集) is a Japanese waka anthology.

== Overview ==
The Akai Shū is a personal collection (kashū) of the waka poetry of Asukai Masachika (飛鳥井雅親). It is in ten volumes. The name of the collection derives from the tōmei, or equivalent Chinese term, for Masachika's office at court, Acting Major Counsellor (gon-dainagon).

== Contents ==
The Akai Shū was compiled by Masachika's eldest son Masatoshi (飛鳥井雅俊) following his father's death, and collects the best poems Masachika composed throughout his life. It contains 1,249 poems, although this is the result of the surviving manuscripts having one poem missing.

The collection is in ten books or scrolls. The first book consists of 100 poems composed in the summer of Bunshō 1 (1466). (Note: 文正元年夏日同詠百首応製和歌) The second book consists of 100 poems composed as offerings to Sumiyoshi taisha in Bunmei 11 (1469) (Note: 文明十一年住吉法楽百首) and 50 others. (Note: 詠五十首和歌) Books 3 through 6 are devoted to poems on the four seasons, books 7 and 8 to love poetry, and books 9 and 10 to poems on various topics (partings, travel and acrostics in book 9; laments, Buddhist and Shinto poems, and congratulations in book 10).

== Textual tradition ==
The first text of the work dates to Meiō 1 (1492), but the standard edition was probably completed at some time before Daiei 3 (1523).

Three forms of the 1492 text are in the manuscript held by the Matsudaira Archives in Shimabara, Nagasaki (島原松平文庫), the printed edition from the Kanbun-Jōkyō eras (1661–1688), and the manuscript held by the Archives and Mausolea Department of the Imperial Household Agency. The later edition is preserved in the manuscript in the holdings of the Tenri Central Library.

== Works cited ==
- Mimura, Terunori (1983). "Akai Shū". Nihon Koten Bungaku Daijiten 日本古典文学大辞典 (in Japanese). Vol. 1. Tokyo: Iwanami Shoten. p. 14. OCLC 11917421.
