= Kashu =

Kashū or Kashu may refer to:

- Kashū (poetry), a type of Japanese poetry anthology
- Another name for Kawachi Province
- Another name for Kaga Province
