= Ben no Menoto =

Poet and wetnurse to Princess Teishi

- 弁乳母
- Born: Fujiwara no Akiko 藤原明子 c. 995
- Died: 1076
- Occupation: Menoto
- Spouse: Fujiwara no Kanetsune
- Children: Fujiwara no Akitsuna
- Father: Fujiwara no Junji
- Relatives: Fujiwara no Nagako (Granddaughter)
- Family: Fujiwara Clan

Ben no Menoto (弁乳母), (995-1076) was the menoto of Princess Teishi, the daughter of Emperor Sanjō. Her real name was Fujiwara no Akiko.

== Life ==
Ben no Menoto was the menoto (wetnurse) of Princess Teishi. She was born in 995, with the personal name of Fujiwara no Akiko, though little other information is known about her childhood. She began her service in 1013, and was supposedly on good terms with Suō no Naishi. She was also a poet, and her poems are collected in the Goshūi Wakashū In 1027 the mother of Princess Teishi, Empress Dowager Fujiwara no Kenshi (Known as Empress Dowager Biwadono in retirement) died. After her death, Ben no Menoto wrote a stanza about seeing the withered iris scent bags still being hung above the old chambers where the Empress Dowager used to stay.

Roots out of season I leave hanging there.

A court lady, Gō Jijū (Daughter of Akazome Emon) responded with her own stanza.

Though there are iris leaves.

In 1076 Ben no Menoto passed away.

== Poetry ==
Japanese
Rōmaji
English

白川の近きわたりにちる花は梢に懸る波かとぞみる

Shirakawa no chikaki watari ni chiru hana wa kozue ni kakaru nami ka to zo miru

The flowers that fall at the approach of the Shirakawa River
are like waves on the treetops.
