= Meimei-an =

Tea house in Matsue, Shimane, Japan

Coordinates: 35.4788°N 133.0523°E

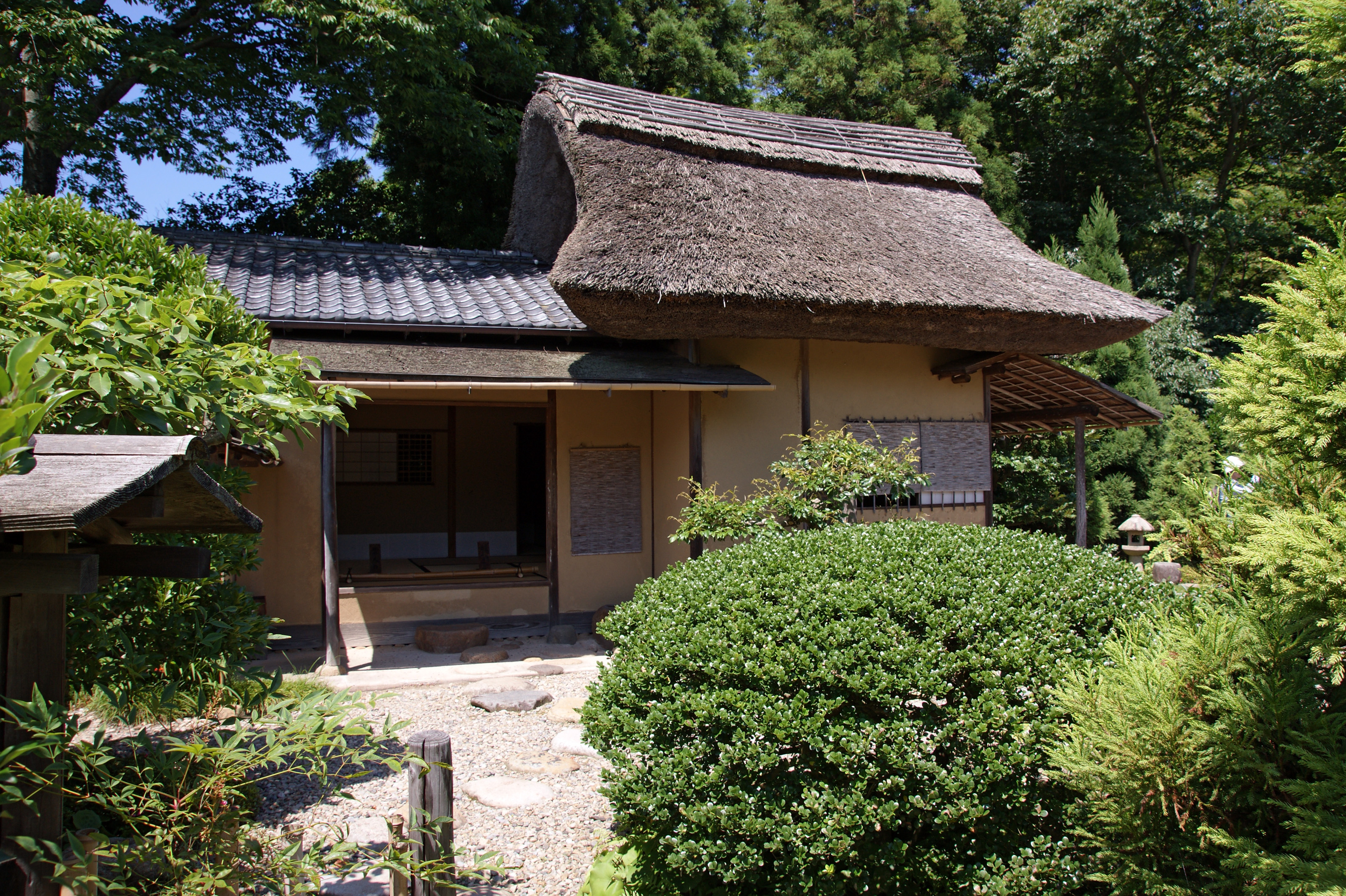
Meimei-an

Meimei-an (明々庵) is a tea house originally constructed in 1779 by Lord Matsudaira Harusato, daimyō of the Matsue clan at that time. It is located in Matsue, Shimane, Japan.

Meimei-an was designed in the style of the Fumai-ko school of tea ceremony (茶道), which was created by the seventh Lord of the Matsudaira to rule from Matsue. His name was Harusato, however, his nickname was Fumai-ko, thus his style of tea ceremony also took on the name Fumai-ryu (不昧流).
