= Sōmon (poetry) =

Sōmon (相聞, "mutual exchanges of love poetry"), or sōmon-ka (相聞歌), is, along with zōka (miscellaneous poems) and banka (elegies), one of the three main categories (三大部立 sandai butate) of poems included in the Man'yōshū, an eighth-century Japanese waka anthology.

== Etymology ==
The word 相聞 (modern Mandarin pronunciation xiāngwén) appears in Chinese works, and its original meaning is "communication of feelings to each other". Unlike zōka and banka, the term sōmon does not originate in the categorization used by the compiler of the Wen Xuan, and was simply a word used to describe everyday communication.

== Meaning ==
In books 11 and 12 of the Man'yōshū, these poems are also called sōmon-ōrai-ka (相聞往来歌),. It is a general term for poems that express personal feelings experienced in everyday human interactions. The majority of these are love poems exchanged between men and women, but they are not all love poems, and the term also covers poems exchanged between friends, parents and children, and siblings. One example of the latter group is the following poem (MYS II : 103) by Princess Ōku about her younger brother Prince Ōtsu:

Man'yōgana	Modern Japanese text	Reconstructed Old Japanese	Modern Japanese	English translation
吾勢祜乎 倭邊遺登 佐夜深而 鷄鳴露尓 吾立所霑之	我が背子を 大和へ遣ると さ夜ふけて 暁露に 我が立ち濡れし	wa ga sekwo wo yamato pye yaru to saywo pukete akatokituyu ni ware tati-nure-si	Wa ga seko o Yamato e yaru to Sayo fukete Akatokitsuyu ni Wa ga tachinureshi	Night had worn away, My brother, when I sent you off On the road to Yamato; Dawn began to streak the sky, And I stood there drenched with dew.

The term can also refer to love poetry in general.

== Usage in the Man'yōshū ==
Books 2, 4, 8, 9, 10, 11, 12, 13 and 14 of the Man'yōshū include sōmon sections, and the total number of sōmon poems in the collection comes to 1,750, or more than a third of the 4,516 poems in the collection. (Non-romantic sōmon poems account for only around 80 of the poems in the collection.) Poems exchanged between lovers are the majority, but the term also covers solo compositions and traditional songs that exhibit folk-tale characteristics. These are further subcategorized, based on their method of expression, into groups such as seijutsu-shinsho-ka (正述心緒歌, also shōjutsu-shinsho-ka), kibutsu-chinshi-ka (寄物陳思歌), and hiyu-ka (譬喩歌). These poems expressing private emotions provide a broad basis for poetic composition, and gave rise to much lyrical poetry.

Zōka were primarily "public" poems composed for official ceremonies and occasions, while sōmon-ka were more personal in their communication of romantic sentiments, and so are generally placed after zōka in the ordering of poems in each book. However, sōmon-ka on the four seasons were mixed in with zōka on the seasons in books 8 and 10. The sōmon categorization does not appear in court anthologies or personal collections, which grouped romantic exchanges in with their love poems, so the poems expressing the feelings between friends and blood relatives began to be classified in the miscellaneous poems.

== Cited works ==
- Frellesvig, Bjarke; Horn, Stephen Wright; Russell, Kerri L.; Sells, Peter (2017). "The Oxford Corpus of Old Japanese". Oxford University Faculty of Oriental Studies website. Oxford University.
- Cranston, Edwin A. (1998). The Gem-Glistening Cup. Stanford: Stanford University Press. ISBN 978-0-804-73157-7.
- Kojima, Noriyuki; Kinoshita, Masatoshi; Satake, Akahiro (1971). Nihon Koten Bungaku Zenshū Vol. 2; Man'yōshū Vol. 1 日本古典文学全集２ 萬葉集一 (in Japanese). Tokyo: Shogakukan. ISBN 4-09-657002-8.
- Kōnoshi, Takamitsu (1994). "Sōmon". Encyclopedia Nipponica (in Japanese). Shogakukan.
- Nozawa, Takuo (2002). "Sōmon / Sōmon-ka". In Nishizawa, Masashi (ed.). Koten Bungaku o Yomu Tame no Yōgo Jiten (in Japanese). Tokyo: Tōkyō-dō Shuppan. pp. 148–149. ISBN 9784490106008.
- Tsuru, Hisashi; Moriyama, Takashi (2012). Man'yōshū 萬葉集 (in Japanese). Tokyo: Ōfū. OCLC 976793715.
