= Hitomaru-eigu =

Hitomaru-eigu (人丸影供) was a type of ritualistic waka composition popular in medieval Japan.

== Name ==
Hitomaru-eigu are also known as Hitomaru-ku (人丸供), Hitomaru-kuyō (人丸供養) or Hitomaro-eigu (人麻呂影供).

== Ritual ==
Hitomaru-eigu involves the collective composition of waka in the form of an uta-awase or uta-kai (歌会) dedicated to the spirit of Kakinomoto no Hitomaro, who was revered as the patron saint of poetry. It was performed before an image of Hitomaro. Dedication of sake or flowers and incense could also be involved.

== History ==
The practice of Hitomaru-eigu flourished from the late Heian period through the middle ages. The first Hitomaru-eigu was held by Rokujō Akisue in 1118 after Hitomaro appeared before him in a dream.
