= Kojijū-shū =

The Kojijū-shū (小侍従集) is a Japanese anthology of waka poetry. It is the personal anthology (kashū) of Kojijū.

== Compiler and date ==
The earliest form of the Kojijū-shū, the personal anthology of the twelfth-century waka poet Kojijū, was compiled by the poet herself around 1181 for submission to a collection of personal anthologies. Later editors then created different sets of poems based on this earlier text. For more details, see #Contents below.

== Contents ==
There are four versions of the text in the surviving manuscripts, which are referred to as kō, otsu, hei and tei (甲乙丙丁).

The kō text, the earliest, was probably compiled by Kojijū herself in the summer or autumn of 1181, in response to a request from Kamo no Shigeyasu (賀茂重保). It is composed of two sections on "the seasons and love" and "various topics", consisting of 118 poems and 69 poems respectively.

The otsu text was then created because of Shigeyasu's request for collections of 100 original poems, and consists of 40 poems on the seasons, 20 on love, and 60 on various topics, a total of 120, 100 of which were composed by Kojijū herself. It is one of the Juei Hyakushu Kashū (寿永百首家集).

While the seasonal and love poems were all composed on a set topic, most (50) of the poems in the "various topics" section are accompanied by headnotes that reminisce about the circumstances of their composition with little concern for their primary themes, although they are largely in the form of poems sent as gifts to lovers. These 50 poems are all common to both the kō and otsu texts.

The hei text was created when a later editor took 33 poems that had been included in imperial anthologies and appended them to the otsu text.

The tei text consists of poems that had been removed from the kō text to create the otsu text. It consists of 69 poems, but the text is damaged and incomplete.

== Textual tradition ==
The surviving manuscripts are placed in three groups and exist in four distinct textual lines. The first group (1) consists of the textual line of theKatsuranomiya-bon, a manuscript held by the Archives and Mausolea Department of the Imperial Household Agency, forming the kō text. The second group consists of the textual lines of the manuscript held by the Sonkei-kaku Archives (2-a), forming the otsu text, and the manuscript held by the Gunsho Ruijū (2-b), forming the hei text. The third group (3) consists of the text contained in the Tankaku Sōsho (丹鶴叢書), forming the tei text.

The popular (rufubon) form of the text is 2-a, and this is the one that was used as a source by compilers of imperial anthologies from the Senzai Wakashū on. Copies of it are held in Archives and Mausolea Department, the Mite Archives (三手文庫), the Ise Grand Shrine Archives (神宮文庫) and the Mukyūkai Kannarai Archives (神習文庫).

== Works cited ==
- Morimoto, Motoko (1983). "Kojijū-shū". Nihon Koten Bungaku Daijiten 日本古典文学大辞典 (in Japanese). Vol. 2. Tokyo: Iwanami Shoten. pp. 607–608. OCLC 11917421.
