= Nara Prefecture Complex of Man'yo Culture =

Museum in Nara Prefecture, Japan

- 奈良県立万葉文化館
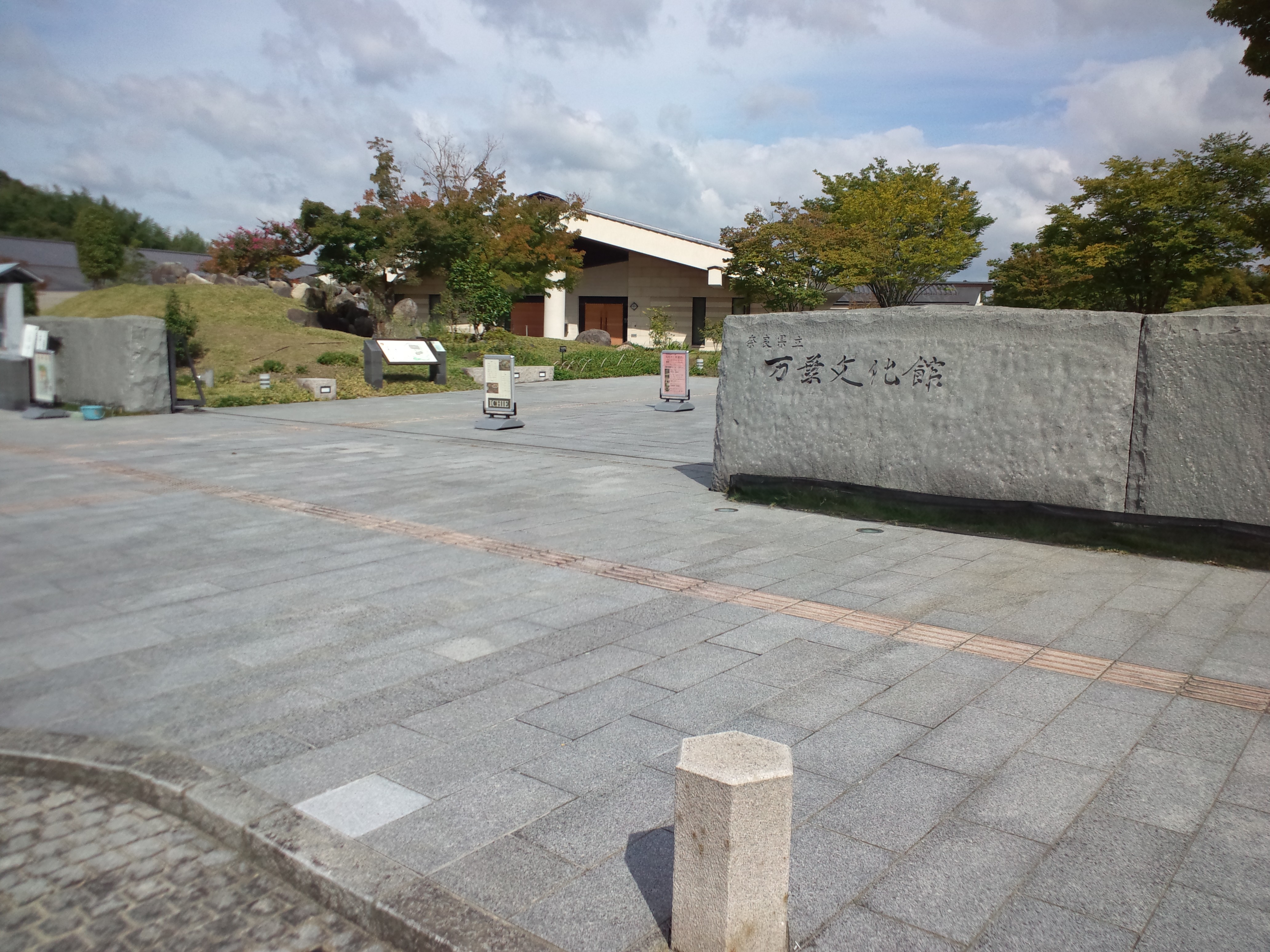
- Main Entrance

- Nara Prefecture Complex of Man'yo Culture in Japan
- Established: 15 September 2001
- Location: 10 Ōaza Asuka; Asuka Village, Takaichi District; Nara Prefecture; 634-0103 Japan
- Coordinates: 34°28′38″N 135°49′20″E
- Type: Art, Literary, and History
- Owner: Nara Prefecture
- Public transit access: Asuka Station
- Website: http://manyo.jp

The Nara Prefecture Complex of Man'yo Culture (奈良県立万葉文化館, Nara-kenritsu Man'yō Bunkakan) is a museum located in Asuka Village, Nara Prefecture, in Japan. It is dedicated to the Man'yōshū, an 8th-century anthology of waka poetry. Its honorary director is Susumu Nakanishi.
