= Gesshō-ji =

Buddhist temple in Matsue, Japan

Gesshō-ji 月照寺
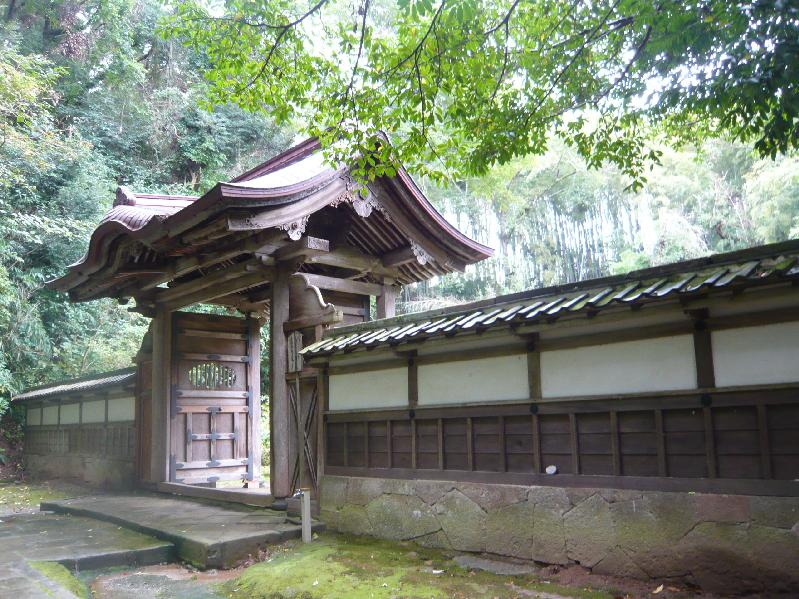
- Gesshō-ji

- Gesshō-ji Gesshō-ji (Japan)

Religion
- Affiliation: Buddhist
- Deity: Amida Nyōrai
- Rite: Jōdō sect

Location
- Location: Tono Nakaharacho, Matsue-shi, Shimane-ken
- Country: Japan
- Interactive map of Gesshō-ji 月照寺
- Coordinates: 35°28′16.9″N 133°2′23.8″E

Architecture
- Founder: Matsudaira Naomasa
- Completed: 1664

Website
- Official website
- National Historic Site of Japan

Gesshō-ji (月照寺) is a Jōdō-shū Buddhist temple in the Tono Nakahara-cho neighborhood of the city of Matsue, Shimane Prefecture Japan. It is the bodaiji of the Matsudaira clan, the daimyō of Matsue Domain during the Edo period. The daimyō cemetery containing the graves of nine generations of the rulers of Matsue was designated as a National Historic Site in 1996.

== Overview ==
Gesshō-ji is located adjacent to Matsue Municipal First Junior High School. It was the location of a Zen temple called Toun-ji, whch had been in ruins for a long time, but Matsudaira Naomasa, the first daimyō of Matsue, rebuilt it in 1664 as the bodaiji to house the memorial tablet of his birth mother, whose dharma name was Gesshō-in. After Naomasa died in Edo in 1666, his remains were taken back to Matsue per his deathbed wishes, and a mausoleum was built within the temple grounds. The gate of this mausoleum is a Shimane Prefecture Tangible Cultural Property. The mausoleums of the first to ninth daimyō remain in extremely good condition.

The mausoleum of the seventh daimyō, Matsudaira Harusato (Fumai), who was famous as a tea master, features magnificent wooden carvings, and its gate is also a Shimane Prefecture Tangible Cultural Property. The grave of the Edo period sumo wrestler Raiden Tameemon is also located at this temple.

The temple was largely destroyed in a fire in 1716, but the main hall was rebuilt. Following the Meiji restoration, due to the government's anti-Buddhist movement, the main hall was destroyed again, but the graveyard remained almost completely intact.

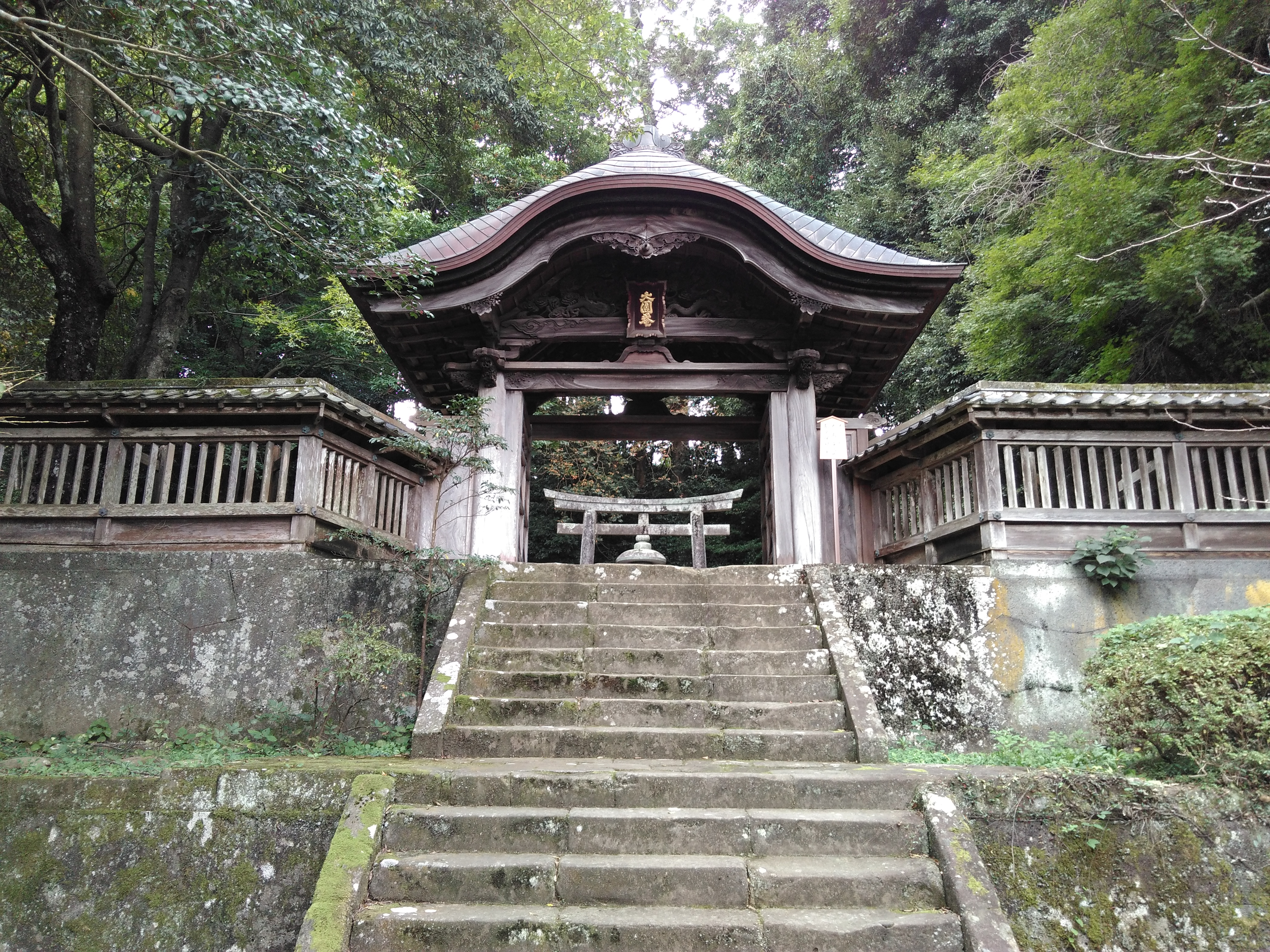
Mausoleum of Matsudaira Harusato (Fumai)

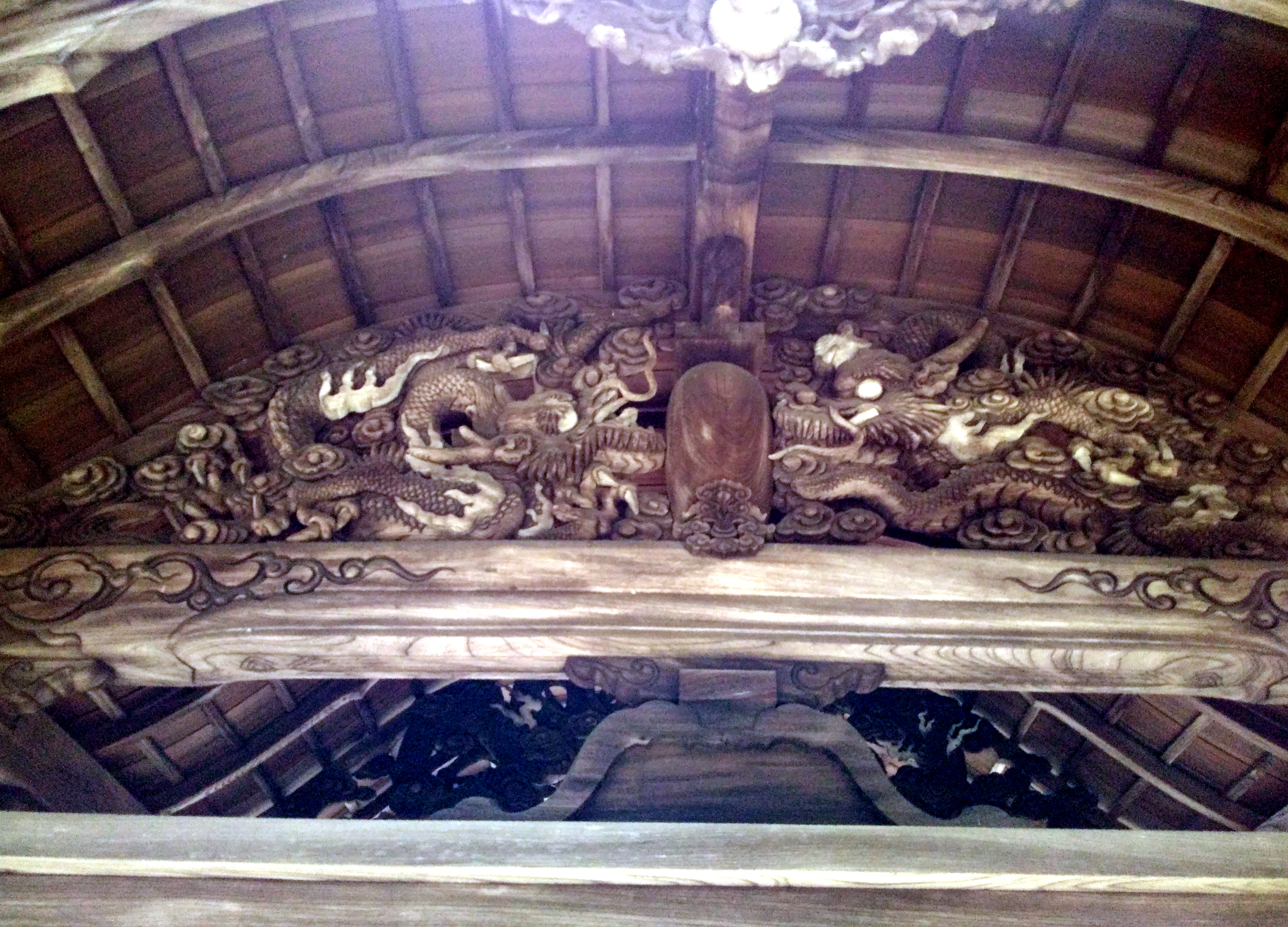
Mausoleum of Matsudaira Harusato (Fumai)

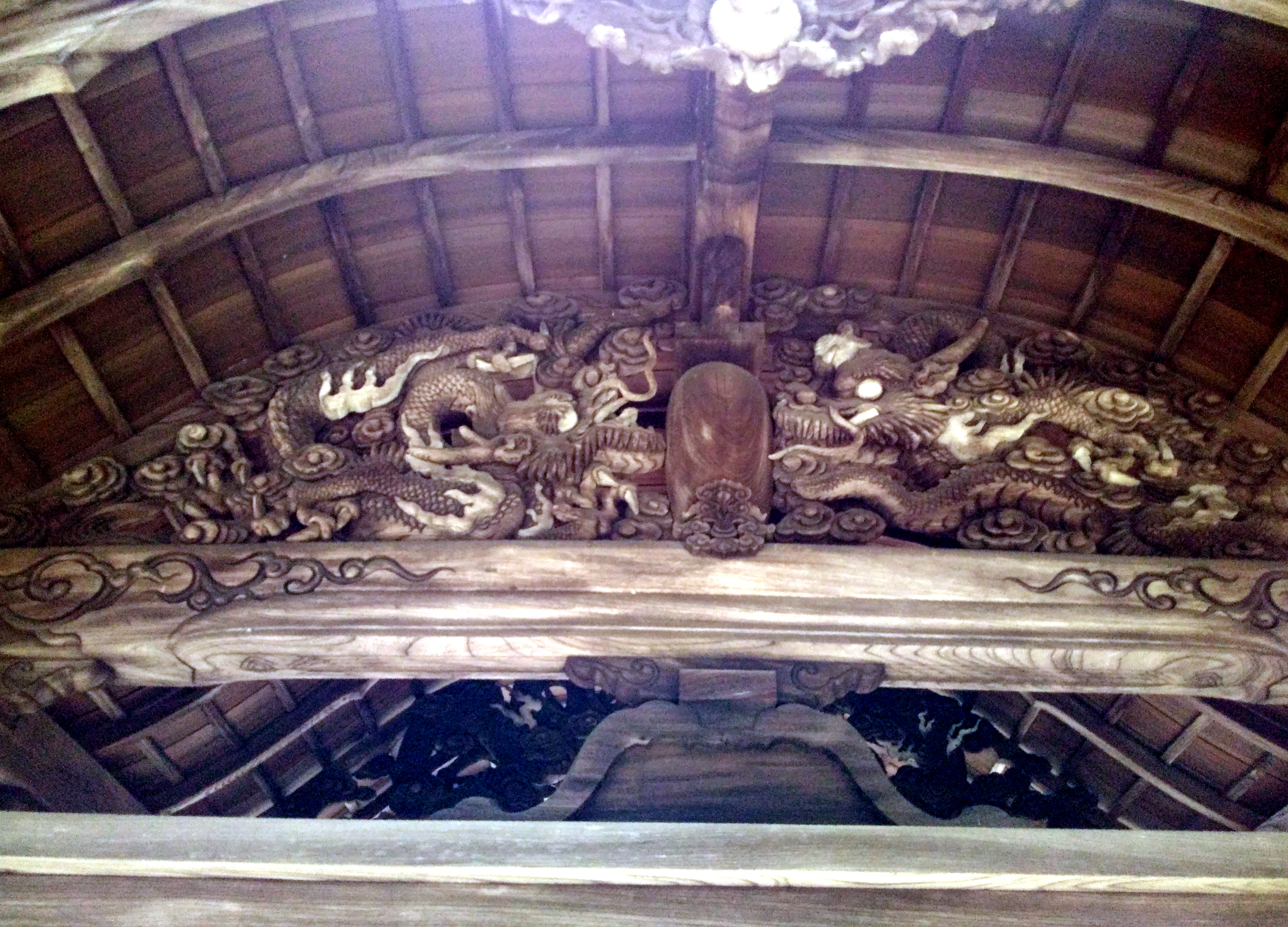
Mausoleum of Matsudaira Harusato (Fumai)

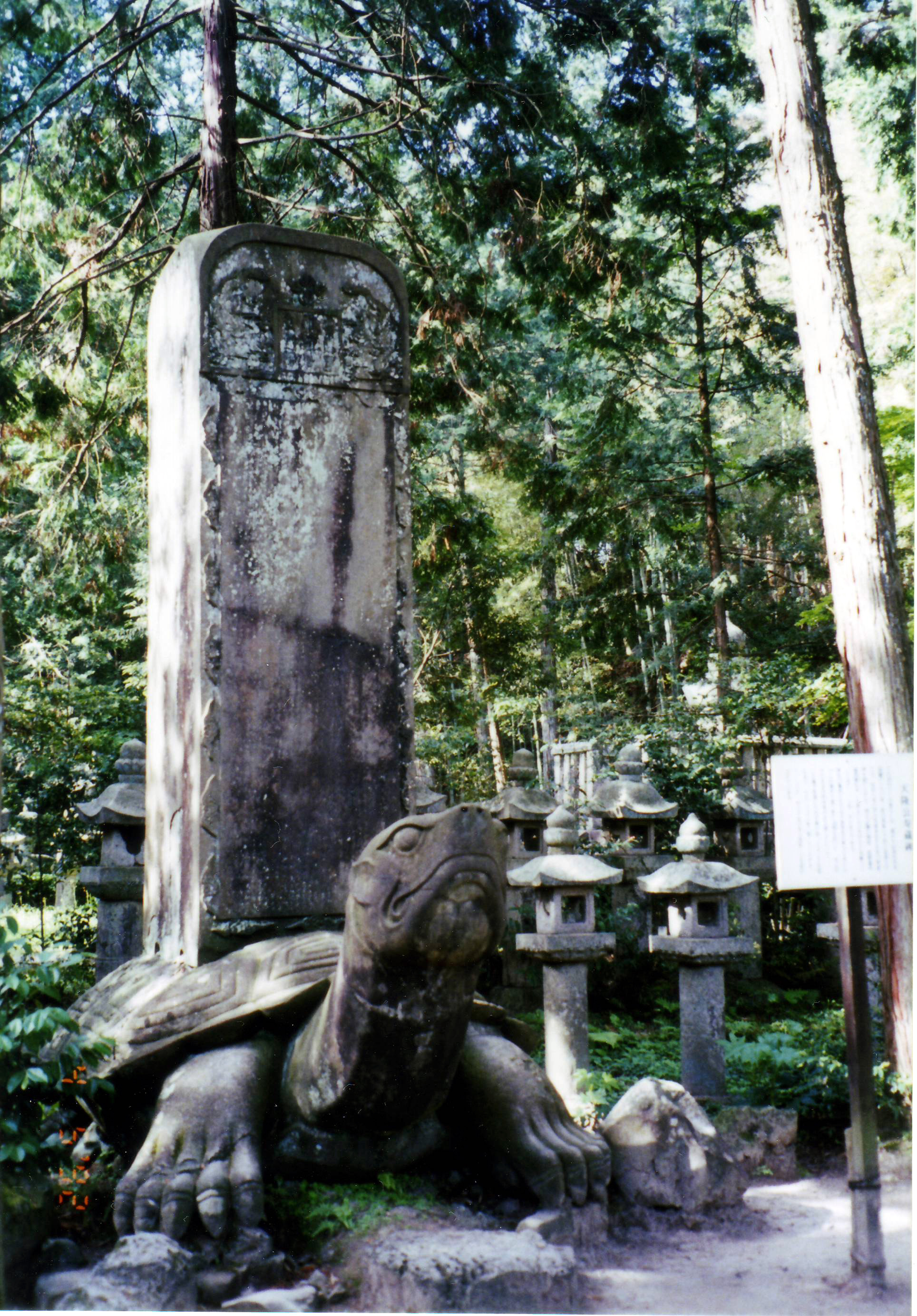
The stone turtle, representing longevity

Within the temple grounds is a large stone turtle on which a huge pillar is planted. According to legend, this pillar was planted in the turtle's back to prevent it from wandering at night terrorizing the inhabitants of Matsue. This legend appears in one of the tales of Lafcadio Hearn who worked for more than a year in the city as an English teacher in 1890.

The temple is also known as the “temple of hydrangeas” which bloom there by the thousands in June.

== See also ==
- List of Historic Sites of Japan (Shimane)
