= Okikaze-shū =

The Okikaze-shū (興風集), is a Japanese anthology of waka poetry. It is the personal anthology (kashū) of Fujiwara no Okikaze. It is one of the Sanjūroku-nin Shū (三十六人集).

It was put together by an unknown compiler sometime after the mid-10th century and survives in three variant textual traditions. It incorporates poems taken from the first two imperial anthologies, as well as a number of poems from an unknown source. Later, imperial anthologies attributed poems to Okikaze based on their inclusion in this collection.

== Compiler and date ==
The Okikaze-shū is a personal collection (kashū) of the waka of the 10th-century poet Fujiwara no Okikaze. It was not personally compiled by Okikaze, but by a later, unknown compiler, in the mid- or late-Heian period.

== Textual tradition ==
The Okikaze-shū has three distinct textual lines, but scholars consider them to have originated from a single Urtext.

Line 1 is the rufubon (common) text, which was printed as part of the Kasen Kashū during the Shōhō era (the Shōhō-ban Kasen Kashū, 正保版歌仙歌集) and includes 52 poems. The last of these poems, however, is an interpolation (他本歌 tahon-ka) from the Gosenshū. Line 2 is represented by a manuscript traditionally attributed to Bōmon-no-tsubone, and includes 53 poems. Line 3 is represented by the edition included in the Nishihonganji-bon Sanjūroku-nin Shū (the Nishi Hongan-ji text), and includes 57 poems. Lines 1 and 2 more closely resemble each other than either resembles Line 3.

There is also a surviving fragmentary text, the so-called Fujiwara no Okikaze Shū (藤原興風集).

== Contents ==
All three textual lines of the Okikaze-shū are composed of two sections, the first of which consists of poems borrowed from the Kokinshū and the Gosenshū, the latter sections being poems collected by an unknown compiler. The poems that were attributed to Okikaze by the Shinkokinshū and later imperial anthologies were all taken from this latter section.

== Facsimiles and modern editions ==
Facsimile editions include the Fukkoku Nihon Koten Bungakukan, the Gosho-bon Sanjūrokunin-shū, the Sanjūrokunin Kashū and the Nishihonganji-bon Sanjūrokunin Kashū.

Modern printed editions include those of the Gunsho Ruijū, the Shoku Kokka Taikan (a supplement to the Kokka Taikan) and the Katsura no Miya Sōsho Vol. 1.

== Works cited ==
- Okumura, Tsuneya (1983). "Okikaze-shū". Nihon Koten Bungaku Daijiten 日本古典文学大辞典 (in Japanese). Vol. 1. Tokyo: Iwanami Shoten. p. 469. OCLC 11917421.
