= Nijōin no Sanuki Shū =

Anathonlogy of waka poetry

The Nijōin no Sanuki Shū (二条院讃岐集), also known as the Sanuki-shū (讃岐集) is a Japanese anthology of waka poetry. It is the personal anthology (kashū) of Nijōin no Sanuki. The text dates to before 1187, probably 1182, and probably originally consisted of 100 poems, but the manuscript tradition is incomplete and the most that have been recovered is 98. The surviving manuscripts all come from the same textual line, but are divided by critical scholars into two groups based on orthographic differences.

== Compiler and date ==
The Nijōin no Sanuki Shū was probably completed before the Senzai Wakashū was first presented to the emperor in 1187. Sanuki probably compiled the anthology herself in 1182, when she was in her early forties, in response to Kamo no Shigeyasu's solicitation of private collections of 100 poems by contemporary poets of the Juei era, the Juei Hyakushu Kashū (寿永百首家集).

== Contents ==
The surviving manuscripts of the anthology are all missing portions, all amounting to a total of 98 poems. The texts that include more than 98 are later interpolations. Of the 98, nine were originally composed by people other than Sanuki, including Emperor Nijō (Nijō-in) and Mikawa no Naishi.

There is no clear demarcation of the thematic divisions between the poems, but they are broadly divided into three sections of seasonal poems, love poems and poems on various topics. At the end are five poems that were originally meant to be included with the seasonal poems.

== Textual tradition ==
The surviving manuscripts are all in the same textual line, but can be divided into two groups based on the minor differences in content and notation. Group 1 includes the two manuscripts in the possession of the Archives and Mausolea Department of the Imperial Household Agency, one in the possession of the Kyoto University library, one in the Shōkōkan, and others; Group 2 includes the Tōen Bunko manuscript, the Tōdai-bon, the Kyōdai-bon, the Gunshoruijū-bon, and others.

== Works cited ==
- Matsumura, Yūji (1983). "Nijōin no Sanuki Shū". Nihon Koten Bungaku Daijiten 日本古典文学大辞典 (in Japanese). Vol. 4. Tokyo: Iwanami Shoten. p. 594. OCLC 11917421.
