= Kakinomoto no Ason Hitomaro Kashū =

Japanese poem collection

The Kakinomoto no Ason Hitomaro Kashū (柿本朝臣人麿歌集, "Collection of Poems/Songs by Kakinomoto no Ason Hitomaro") or Hitomaro Kashū (人麿歌集) is a lost collection of waka poems that served as a source for the compilers of the Man'yōshū. There is some disagreement among scholars as to which poems included in the surviving Man'yōshū originally came from the Hitomaro Kashū, but it is between 364 and 370. Scholars have speculated on the nature of the original Hitomaro Kashū based on the surviving fragmentary and disjointed evidence.

== Authorship, compiler, date and structure ==
The compiler of the Kakinomoto no Ason Hitomaro Kashū, (hereafter the Hitomaro Kashū) as well as its date and number of books are all unknown. While the text itself does not survive, scholars have been able to guess as to the form the work probably took based on the portions of the late eighth-century Man'yōshū that incorporate a large number of its poems. Poems attributed to it were incorporated into books 2, 3, 7, 9, 10, 11, 12, 13 and 14 of the later anthology.

== Contents ==
Depending on whether the Man'yōshū poems numbered 146 (book 2), 1715, 1716, 1717, 1718 and 1718 (all book 9) were originally taken from the Hitomaro Kashū, the number of poems varies from 364 to 370. Mizue Aso, in her article on the work for the Nihon Koten Bungaku Daijiten, gave the figure of 365. These consist of two chōka, 35 sedōka, and 328 tanka. (All the disputed poems are tanka, so this figure would vary between 327 and 333.) Susumu Nakanishi, in his Man'yōshū Jiten, gave a figure of 369.

=== Script format of tanka ===
The tanka attributed by the compiler(s) of the Man'yōshū to the Hitomaro Kashū are divided into two categories based on how distinctly particles and auxiliary words are represented therein. The poems that carefully indicate these words are called hi-ryakutai-ka (非略体歌), and those that do not are calledryakutai-ka (略体歌). Roughly 127 poems fall into the former group, with roughly 196 in the latter, though opinions on which poems are which group differ between various scholars.

== Works cited ==
- Aso, Mizue (1983). "Kakinomoto no Ason Hitomaro Kashū". Nihon Koten Bungaku Daijiten 日本古典文学大辞典 (in Japanese). Vol. 1. Tokyo: Iwanami Shoten. pp. 584–586. OCLC 11917421.
- Nakanishi, Susumu (1985). Man'yōshū Jiten (Man'yōshū zen'yakuchū genbun-tsuki bekkan) (paperback ed.). Tokyo: Kōdansha. ISBN 4-06-183651-X.
