= Tosa Nikki =

Japanese poetic diary by Ki no Tsurayuki

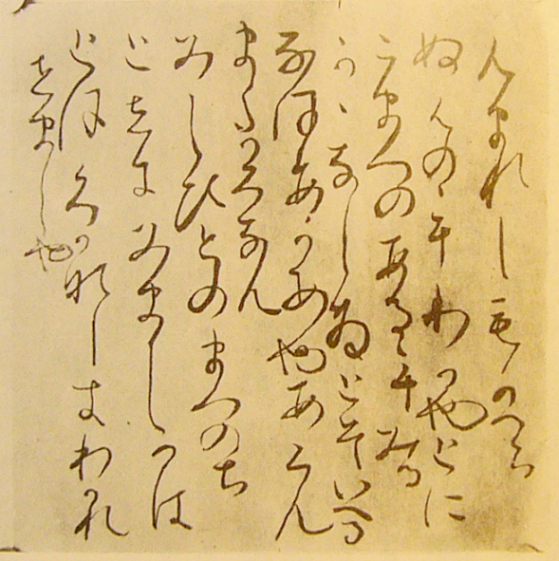
Tosa Nikki faithfully copied by Fujiwara no Teika (1162–1241) (Museum of the Imperial Collections)

The Tosa Nikki (土佐日記, Tosa Diary) is a poetic diary written anonymously by the tenth-century Japanese poet Ki no Tsurayuki. The text details a 55-day journey in 935 returning to Kyoto from Tosa province, where Tsurayuki had been the provincial governor. The prose account of the journey is punctuated by Japanese poems, purported to have been composed on the spot by the characters.

== Diary prose ==
The Tosa Nikki is the first notable example of the Japanese diary as literature. Until its time, the word "diary" (nikki) denoted dry official records of government or family affairs, written by men in Sino-Japanese. By contrast, the Tosa Diary is written in the Japanese language, using phonetic kana characters. Literate men of the period wrote in both kana and kanji, but women typically were not taught the latter, being restricted to kana literature. By framing the diary in the point of view of a fictitious female narrator, Tsurayuki could avoid employing Chinese characters or citing Chinese poems, focusing instead on the aesthetics of the Japanese language and its poetry.

== Travel poetry ==
The Tosa Nikki is associated with travel poems (kiryoka) (such as those compiled in the Man'yōshū) as well as the utamakura and utanikki. These texts constitute the Japanese travel journal, which—as a literary genre—is considered inseparable from poetry. These follow the tradition of weaving of poems and the use of introductory narratives written in a logical structure. Like other poems in the genre, the Tosa Nikki also explored the significance of landscape as well poems written about it. Even the Tosa Nikki was also alluded to by other poems such as the maeku.

The Tosa Nikki also implements fictional names of places to call on earlier and traditional Japanese texts. The usage of fictional names also allows a merge between fictional and autobiographical genres. By incorporating fictional elements with real scenery in both narration and poems, Tosa Nikki allows allusions to previous works and conveys different images and significance to those already popular locations.

== Locations in Tosa Nikki ==
Below are the dates and locations the narrator travelled to. The dates are written according to the lunar calendar.

Date	Areas Visited	Current Day Location
21st day of the 12th month	Kokufu (Depart)	Around Nankoku city, Kochi prefecture
21st-26th day of the 12th month	Otsu	Otsu, Kochi city, Kochi prefecture
27th day of the 12th month	Urado	Urado, Kochi city, Kochi prefecture
29th day of the 12th month	Ominato	Maehama, Shikoku city, Kochi prefecture
9th day of the 1st month	Uta no Matsubura	Around Kishimoto, Konan city, Kochi prefecture
10th day of the 1st month	Naha no tomari	Nahari town, Aki district, Kochi prefecture
11th day of the 1st month	Hane	Hane town, Muroto city, Kochi prefecture
12th day of the 1st month	Murotsu	Murotsu, Muroto city, Kochi prefecture
29th day of the 1st month	Tosa no Tomari	Narutochotosadomariura, Naruto city, Tokushima prefecture
30th day of the 1st month	Awa no Mito	Narutokaikyo
"	Nushima	Nushima, Minamiawaji city, Hyogo prefecture
"	Izumo no Nada	(Southwestern Osaka)
1st day of the 2nd month	Kurosaki no Matsubara	Tannowa, Sennangun Misaki town, Osaka prefecture
"	Hako no Ura	Hakonoura, Hannan city, Osaka prefecture
5th day of the 2nd month	Ishizu	Hanadera, Sakai city, Osaka prefecture
"	Sumiyoshi	Hanadera, Sakai city, Osaka prefecture
6th day of the 2nd month	Naniwa	Osaka city, Osaka prefecture
8th day of the 2nd month	Torigahi no mimaki	Torikai, Settsu city, Osaka prefecture
9th day of the 2nd month	Nagisa no In	Nagisamoto town, Hirakata city, Osaka prefecture
"	Udono	Udono, Takatsuki city, Osaka prefecture
11th day of the 2nd month	Hachiman no miya	Iwashimizuhachimanngu
"	Yamazaki	Otokunigun oyamazaki town, Kyoto Prefecture
16th day of the 2nd month	Shimazaki	Otou street, Kamiueno town, Mukou city, Kyoto prefecture
"	Kyo (Arrival to the Capital)	Kyoto City, Kyoto Prefecture

== Themes ==
=== Grief ===
The loss of a child and a grieving parent are frequently mentioned by the narrator and the many that accompany the journey. For example, on the 27th of the 12th month, it referenced "a parent [who] was lost in grief for an absent child" with the poem accompanying the day also written about "one among us who will not be going home". This suggests that the child had passed recently or during the journey. Another example can be found on the 5th day of the 2nd month, as the grieving mother composes her own poem and expresses her pain and unwillingness to forget about her child. An interpretation can be that the child is still among the group spiritually, and the mother's grief is the emotional attachment keeping the child from moving on.

It is speculated that Ki no Tsurayuki has lost a child during this time, and alluded to his and his family's grief through various characters the narrator encounters.
