= Tajihi clan =

Japanese noble family

Tajihi clan 多治比氏
- Parent house: Imperial family
- Founder: Prince Tajihiko (多治比古王), grandson of Prince Kamueha (上殖葉王), son of Emperor Senka

The Tajihi clan (多治比氏 Tajihi-uji; also written as 多治, 丹比, 丹治, 丹墀) was a Japanese noble family. They were most prominent in the early Nara period, when they furnished several senior officers of the central government, before they were gradually driven out of the centre of power by the rival Fujiwara clan.

== Name ==
The name of the Tajihi clan can be written with various combinations of kanji, including 多治比, 多治, 丹比, 丹治, and 丹墀. The clan were descendants of Prince Tajihiko, who, according to tradition, was named for the tajihi (多治比, Japanese knotweed) blossoms that were blown by at the time of his birth, but it seems more likely that the clan were named for Tajihi District (丹比郡) in Kawachi Province.

== History ==
The Tajihi clan's ancestor Prince Tajihiko was a great-grandson of the sixth-century Emperor Senka through his son Prince Kamueha. Their imperial ancestry categorizes them as one of the kōbetsu (皇別) clans, descended from the Japanese imperial family. The clan's original kabane was Kimi (公), but were given the title Mahito (or Mabito) by Emperor Tenmu in 684.

Tajihi no Shima, who served at the courts of Emperor Tenmu, Empress Jitō and Emperor Monmu, rose to the prestigious rank of Minister of the Left. His sons Ikemori (多治比池守), Agatamori (多治比県守), Hironari (多治比広成), Hirotari (多治比広足) held various key positions at court, including dainagon and chūnagon. Tajihi no Mamune (多治比真宗, 769–823), a great-granddaughter of Ikemori, served as a consort of Emperor Kanmu.

Until the middle of the Nara period the Tajihi were one of the clans at the pinnacle of court society, but after this time became increasingly overshadowed by the Fujiwara clan. Around the start of the Heian period the Tajihi clan mostly disappeared from the court society. The Tantō clan, a group of warriors in Musashi Province and one of the so-called Musashi Shichitō, were remote descendants of the Tajihi clan who took up martial ways.

== Works cited ==
- Mayuzumi, Hiromichi (1994). "Tajihi-uji". Encyclopedia Nipponica (in Japanese). Shogakukan.
