= Matsudaira Harusato =

Daimyō

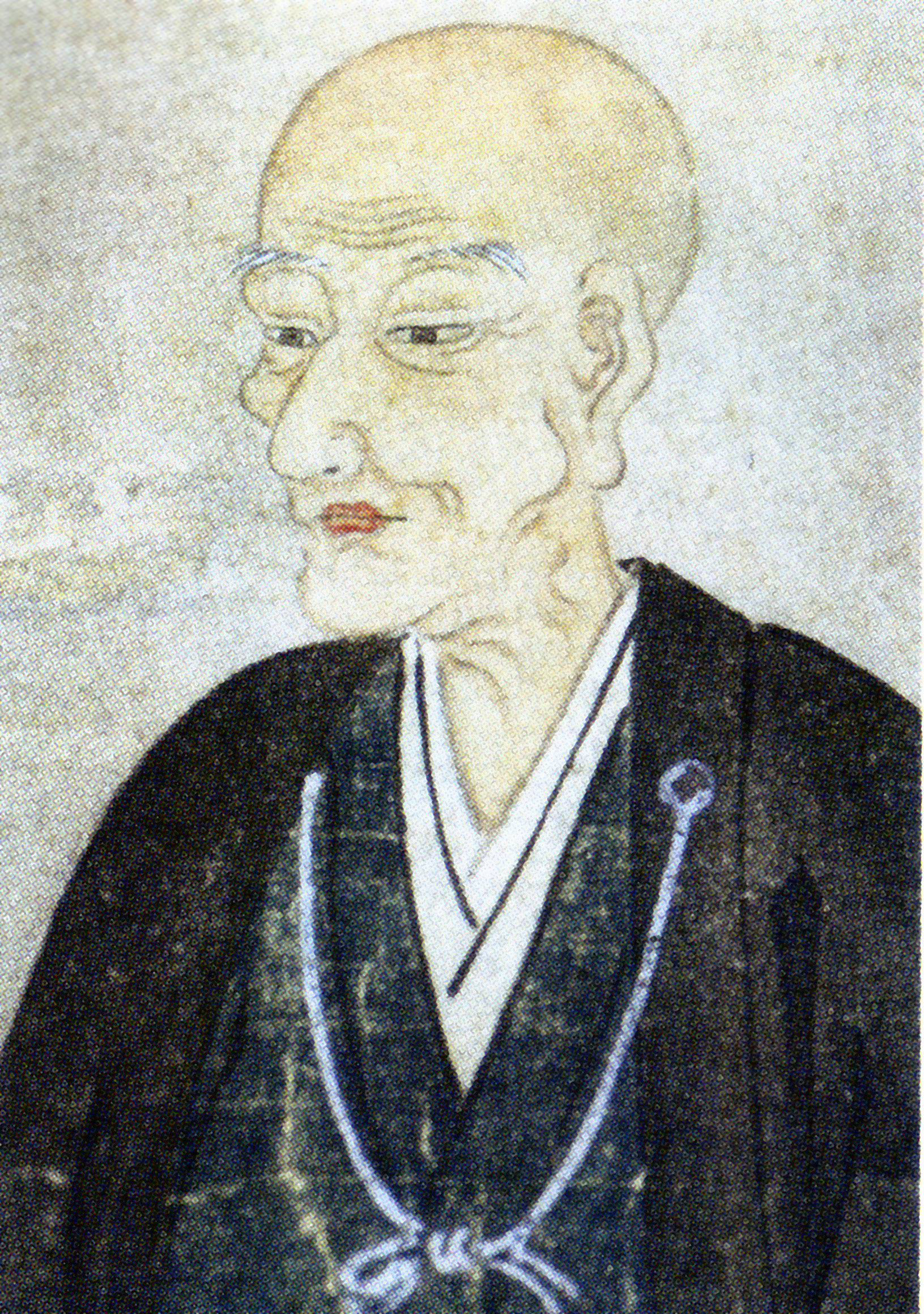
- Matsudaira Harusato (Fumai)

7th Lord of Matsue
- In office 1767–1806
- Preceded by: Matsudaira Munenobu
- Succeeded by: Matsudaira Naritsune

Personal details
- Born: March 11, 1751
- Died: May 28, 1818 (aged 67)

Matsudaira Harusato (松平 治郷; 1751–1818) was a Japanese daimyō of the mid-Edo period, who ruled the Matsue Domain. He was renowned as a tea master, under the name Matsudaira Fumai (松平 不昧).

== Early life ==
Harusato was born at the Matsudaira residence in Edo (present-day Tokyo) in 1751, the second son of Matsudaira Munenobu, who then ruled Matsue.

== Headship ==
Harusato succeeded his father, Munenobu, as lord of the Izumo Matsue fief when his father, the 6th-generation lord of the fief, retired in the 6th year of the Meiwa era (1769). By then, due largely to contributions ordered by the bakufu for the repair of Enryaku-ji temple, the fief had been reduced to a state of poverty. With the support of his chief retainer, Asahi Tamba, Harusato set about reversing the situation quickly by increasing production of the fief's major products and making the rice paddy area of the fief more secure by the promotion of flood control. These efforts met with success, and the Izumo Matsue fief was among the fastest to accomplish reform.

== Fumai as Tea Master ==
In terms of the history of the Japanese tea ceremony, with the advent of the Tokugawa period in 1615, the fashion of samurai personally practicing chanoyu lost its attraction; chanoyu lost its function as a focal point for political ties among the samurai. From about the middle of the 18th century, however, the old-guard samurai who had scorned chanoyu as the idle game of indolent men of leisure had died. By this time, many of the new generation of daimyōs were rising as leaders in the development of urban culture. Matsudaira Harusato was outstanding among them.

As he was early into his mission of restoring the finances and government of his fief, Harusato in 1770 wrote a treatise titled Mudagoto [Useless words], apparently in opposition to his main retainer Asahi Tanba who criticized him for use of fief funds toward chanoyu. In the Mudagoto, Harusato states: "Making chanoyu a luxury, exhausting beauty to make it splendid is a distressful thing ... rather, it can be made an adjutant to governing the country well."

His chanoyu mentor was Isa Kōtaku (1684–1745), a disciple of the Rinzai Zen monk Ikei Sōetsu (253rd abbot of Daitokuji temple, Kyoto, and later, founder of Kōgen'in temple in Edo [Tokyo]), who was in turn a disciple of the daimyō and chanoyu master Katagiri Sadamasa Sekishū (1605–73). He was also privy to a copy of the Nanpōroku (南方録), a record of the chanoyu teachings of Sen no Rikyū, from Arai Itsushō (1726–1804), who was a tea devotee in Edo in the chanoyu tradition of Hosokawa Tadaoki (a.k.a. Hosokawa Sansai).

== See also ==
- Matsue Domain
- Meimei-an
- Schools of Japanese tea ceremony

== Notes ==
Preceded by Matsudaira Munenobu	7th Daimyō of Matsue; 1767–1806	Succeeded by Matsudaira Naritsune
