= Sonpi Bunmyaku =

Japanese genealogical text from the 14th century

Sonpi Bunmyaku (尊卑分脈) is a Japanese genealogical text. Originally written by Tōin Kinsada in the late 14th century, it was either 15 or 16 volumes in length. This was followed by re-edited editions eventually bringing the text to thirty volumes in length. The full title is 新編纂圖本朝尊卑分脈系譜雜類要集; it is a collection of genealogies of both aristocrats and warriors. The book is considered one of the primary sources for the study of genealogies of nobility in Japan, in particular for nobles of Heian and Kamakura periods. The book is also known under the title Shoke Ōkeizu (諸家大系図) and Shoke Keifuden (諸家系譜伝). Not every part of the book survived, but those that survived tend to be details about members of Fujiwara clan and Minamoto clan. Like other major genealogy books, the real names of women (e.g., Murasaki Shikibu), except for very few, are not mentioned in the book.

Its contents include genealogies for the following families:

- Abe
- Fujiwara
- Kamo clan
- Ki
- Minamoto
- Mononobe
- Nakatomi
- Ōe
- Ono
- Ozuki
- Sakanoue
- Soga
- Sugawara
- Tachibana
- Taira
- Tajihi
- Tanba
- Wake
