= Fujiwara no Nagako =

Japanese author and servant

Fujiwara no Nagako (c. 1079 – after 1119) was a servant of two Japanese emperors during the Heian period. She is famous for being the author of a nikki bungaku.

== Career ==
She became famous under the two notnames of Sanuki Tenji (Court lady of the Sanuki Province) and Sanuki no Suke (Assistant from Sanuki). This described her position as a servant in the court of the emperors Horikawa (1087–1107) and Toba (1107–1123). She then wrote Nikki Bungaku, a literary but quotidian diary intended to educate other readers. Typical for the genre, her identity was not revealed. In 1929, Tamai Kosuke identified the person behind Sanuki Tenji as Nagako from the Fujiwara family.

Fujiwara no Nagako was thought to be the youngest daughter of provincial administrator Fujiwara no Akitsuna, an essential figure in court. Nagako served for eight years as the second-ranked female servant in the Horikawa court, who was likely her age. She may have been a concubine. Her older sister had been Horikawa's wet nurse and had entered a monastery while grieving his death in 1107. Nagako continued serving Horikawa's successor, Tenno, with dampened enthusiasm. She served Toba for another twelve years until the new emperor neared adulthood. In 1119, she was pushed away from Toba: It was reported that she became maniacal, developed delusions of seeing Horikawa, and uttered prophecies. An alternative reason would be allegations of lacking discretion. Her removal from court ended her presence in historical records; her date of death is not known.

Two courtiers have been alleged to be her husband.

She has been characterized as a modest and educated woman in a comparatively liberal century.

== Work ==
Sanuki no Suke Nikki consists of two extant volumes. The 31 historical copies of her manuscript differ. It is presumed that copyists of later eras modified the text. For example, passages may have been influenced by Buddhist beliefs contemporary to the copyists. A third volume, set between the other two, has been hypothesized.

Sanuki Tenji contains detailed observations on contemporary lifestyles, especially of the Tenno and his court. Among them are Shintoistic rituals as well as the monarch's leisure activities. The very optimistic point of view of Sanuki Tenji is the only extant record.

The first volume briefly recounts service in Horikawa's court; the second volume reflects much more time and literary freedom. The second volume includes 23 poems, several of them citations of other poets, but most of them prove Nagako's aptitude in poetry. The second volume stops abruptly at the beginning of 1109; a different author wrote the closing lines.
