= Danchōtei Nichijō =

Japanese manga series

- First wideban volume cover

断腸亭にちじょう
- Genre: Autobiography
- Manga
- Written by: Gump
- Published by: Shogakukan
- Imprint: Shōnen Sunday Comics Special
- Magazine: Sunday Webry
- Original run: November 28, 2021 – June 29, 2025
- Volumes: 6

Danchōtei Nichijō (断腸亭にちじょう) is a Japanese manga series written and illustrated by Gump. It was serialized on Shogakukan's Sunday Webry website between November 2021 and June 2025.

== Synopsis ==
The series focuses on the author who, after getting his series' first volume reprinted, gets told by his doctor that he has colon cancer. The series depicts his everyday struggles as he deals with it.

== Publication ==
Written and illustrated by Gump, Danchōtei Nichijō was serialized on Shogakukan's Sunday Webry website from November 28, 2021 to June 29, 2025. Its chapters were compiled into six wideban volumes (including the last three released digital-only) released from May 12, 2022, to October 12, 2025.

| No. | Release date | ISBN |
|---|---|---|
| 1 | May 12, 2022 | 978-4-09-851139-6 |
| 2 | May 12, 2023 | 978-4-09-852134-0 |
| 3 | June 30, 2023 | 978-4-09-852135-7 |
| 4 | August 12, 2025 (ebook) | — |
| 5 | September 12, 2025 (ebook) | — |
| 6 | October 12, 2025 (ebook) | — |

== Reception ==
The series' third volume received a recommendation from manga artist Minoru Toyoda.

The series won the New Artist Prize at the 27th Tezuka Osamu Cultural Prize in 2023.
