= Wani clan =

Japanese clan

Wani clan 和珥氏
- Parent house: Imperial family (according to tradition)
- Founder: Prince Ameoshitarashi (according to tradition)
- Founding year: reign of Emperor Kōshō, roughly fifth century BCE (according to tradition)

The Wani clan (和珥氏) was a sacerdotal Japanese clan. According to the Kojiki, the Wani clan was descended from Prince Ameoshitarashi, a son of Emperor Kōshō.

The Wani clan is believed to be related to Wani dragons, with Naniwa-neko Takefurukuma described as an ancestor. Marrying women of the Wani clan was believed to give the Emperor control over the sea.

They had a similar religious role to the Sarume clan as mediums, so many women of the Sarume clan had husbands of the Wani clan perform ritual roles as substitutes for men of the Sarume clan.

The clan declined in the 7th century but cadet branches such as the Ono clan and the Kakinomoto clan continued to thrive.

They were sometimes called the Wanizumi clan, with -mi being an honorific suffix.

== Kakinomoto clan ==
Kakinomoto clan 柿本氏
- Parent house: Wani clan, Imperial family (according to tradition)
- Founder: Prince Ameoshitarashi (as the Wani clan; according to tradition)
- Founding year: possibly late sixth century (as the Kakinomoto clan); reign of Emperor Kōshō, roughly fifth century BCE (as the Wani clan; according to tradition)

The Kakinomoto clan (柿本氏 Kakinomoto-uji) was a Japanese noble family particularly active in the Yamato period. It was the clan of the famous Asuka-Nara poet Kakinomoto no Hitomaro.

=== Legendary origins and parent clan ===
According to the Kojiki, the Kakinomoto clan was descended from Prince Ameoshitarashi, a son of Emperor Kōshō. The Shinsen Shōjiroku records that the clan, along with others such as the Ōyake, Awata and Ono (ja) clans had split from the earlier Kasuga clan, a branch of the Wani clan, and that they were natives of Yamato Province who had adopted the name "Kakinomoto" during the reign of Emperor Bidatsu in the late sixth century. Centred in the northeastern part of the Nara Basin, the Wani clan had furnished many imperial consorts in the fourth through sixth centuries, and extended their influence from Yamato Province to Yamashiro, Ōmi, Tanba and Harima provinces. Many of their clan traditions (including genealogies, songs, and tales) are preserved in the Nihon Shoki and, especially, the Kojiki.

=== Home region ===
According to Masatada Watase, there are two prominent theories regarding the location of the Kakinomoto clan's headquarters, one placing them in Shinjō, Nara, and the other placing them in the Ichinomoto area of Tenri, Nara. Watase states, based on some passages in the Dai-Nihon Ko-Monjo, the Heian Ibun and the Tōdaiji Yōroku, that the latter theory carries more weight. Since their cousins in the main Wani clan were also based in this area, Watase speculates that the Kakinomoto clan had a particularly close relationship with the Wani clan.

=== Seventh and eighth centuries ===
The Kakinomoto clan had their hereditary title promoted from Omi to Ason in the eleventh month (see Japanese calendar) of 684. According to the Nihon Shoki, Kakinomoto no Saru, (Note: The Nihon Shoki spells this name 柿本臣猨, while the Shoku Nihongi spells it 柿本朝臣佐留, 臣 and 朝臣 reflecting the 684 change in title.) the probable head of the clan, had been among ten people appointed shōkinge, equivalent to Junior Fifth Rank, in the twelfth month of 681. These facts lead Watase to conjecture that the Kakinomoto clan may have had some literary success in the court of Emperor Tenmu. According to the Shoku Nihongi, Saru died in 708, having attained the Junior Fourth Rank, Lower Grade.

The famous seventh-century poet Kakinomoto no Hitomaro was born into this clan. There are several theories regarding the relationship of Hitomaro to Kakinomoto no Saru, including Saru being Hitomaro's father, brother or uncle, or them being the same person. The theory that they were the same person has been advanced by Takeshi Umehara, but has little supporting evidence. While the other theories cannot be confirmed, it is certain that they were members of the same clan (probably close relatives), and were active at the same time. It is likely that their mutual activity at court had a significant effect on the fortunes of the clan, and on each other.

== See also ==
- Yagi clan

== Works cited ==
- Keene, Donald (1999) [1993]. A History of Japanese Literature, Vol. 1: Seeds in the Heart – Japanese Literature from Earliest Times to the Late Sixteenth Century (paperback ed.). New York, NY: Columbia University Press. ISBN 978-0-231-11441-7.
- Watase, Masatada (1983). "Kakinomoto no Hitomaro". Nihon Koten Bungaku Daijiten 日本古典文学大辞典 (in Japanese). Vol. 1. Tokyo: Iwanami Shoten. pp. 586–588. OCLC 11917421.
