= Susumu Nakanishi =

Japanese academic

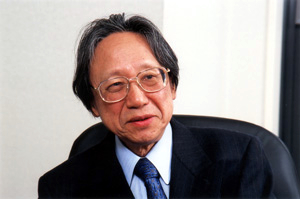
- 2009
- Born: August 21, 1929; Japan Tokyo
- Education: University of Tokyo
- Occupation: Researcher of Japanese literature

Susumu Nakanishi (中西進, Nakanishi Susumu; born 21 August 1929 in Tokyo) is a scholar of Japanese literature, particularly of the Man'yōshū. He earned his Doctor of Literature degree from the University of Tokyo (UTokyo) in 1962.

He is widely believed to have conceived the name of the current era of the official calendar of Japan, Reiwa (令和, 2019-). However, it is a custom not to reveal the conceiver of the name of an era, and he has said, 'Era names are not for secular individuals like Susumu Nakanishi to decide, but are determined by divine inspiration. There is no such person as the inventor of the name "Reiwa"'.

== Overview ==
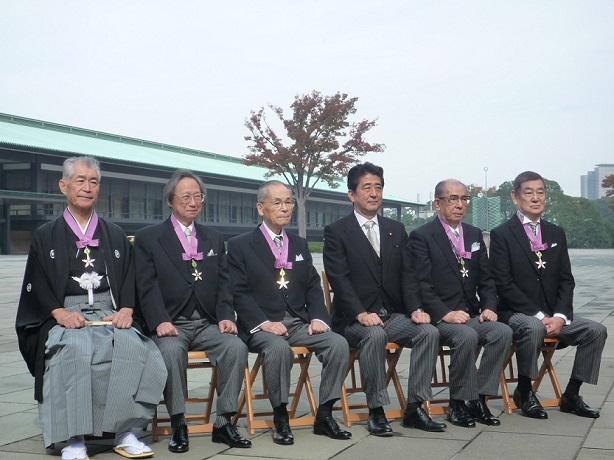
Shun-ichi Iwasaki, Ken Takakura, Seikaku Takagi, Nakanishi and Tasuku Honjo received the Order of Culture from Emperor Akihito on November 3, 2013. After that they posed for photo with Shinzō Abe at the East Garden of the Imperial Palace.

Nakanishi studied at the Department of Japanese Literature at the University of Tokyo (UTokyo), where he was supervised by the Japanese literary scholar Senichi Hisamatsu (久松潜一). He graduated from the university in 1953 with a Bachelor of Arts in Literature. He continued his studies at UTokyo. His master's thesis was titled 'A Study on the Prosaic Nature in Early Japanese Literature (上代文藝における散文性の研究)'. Nakanishi continued to study under Hisamatsu during his postgraduate studies. In 1954, he lectured part-time at Yukigaya High School.

Nakanishi earned a Master of Arts in Literature from UTokyo in 1955. He wrote his doctoral thesis titled 'A Comparative Literary Study of the Man'yōshū (萬葉集の比較文学的研究)', and he earned a Doctor of Literature degree from UTokyo in 1962. Subsequently, he began comparative studies between ancient Japanese literature and Chinese literature.

He is the honorary president of the Nara Prefecture Complex of Manyo Culture, president of the Koshinokuni Museum of Literature, and has been a guest lecturer at Princeton University. In 1970 he was awarded the Japan Academy Prize for his research in comparative literature and the Man'yōshū, and in 2013 he received the Order of Culture. He has been called "probably the greatest living scholar of the Man'yōshū in Japan".

== Honours ==
- 2005: The Order of the Sacred Treasure, Gold and Silver Star
- 2013: The Order of Culture
