= Nijō Tamesada =

Japanese courtier and waka poet (1293–1360)

Nijō Tamesada (二条為定, 1293–1360), also known as Fujiwara no Tamesada (藤原為定), was a Japanese courtier and waka poet of the late Kamakura period and Nanbokuchō period.

== Biography ==
Nijō Tamesada was born in 1293. His father was Nijō Tamemichi, and his mother was a daughter of Asukai Masaari, Tamemichi's father was Nijō Tameyo, Tameyo being a son of Nijō Tameuji, a grandson of Fujiwara no Tameie, and a great-grandson of Fujiwara no Teika. Tamesada was a member of the Nijō branch of the Fujiwara clan, so is known as both Nijō Tamefuji and Fujiwara no Tamefuji.

He died on the fourteenth day of the third month of Enbun 5 (1360).

== Works cited ==
- "Nijō Tameyo" 二条為世. Bijutsu Jinmei Jiten (in Japanese). Shibunkaku. 2016.
- Inoue, Muneo (1983). "Nijō Tamesada". Nihon Koten Bungaku Daijiten 日本古典文学大辞典 (in Japanese). Vol. 4. Tokyo: Iwanami Shoten. p. 595. OCLC 11917421.
- Inoue, Muneo (1994). "Fujiwara no Tameyo" 二条為世. Encyclopedia Nipponica (in Japanese). Shogakukan.
