= Mahito =

- Gender: Male

Origin
- Origin: Japanese
- Meaning: Different meanings depending on the kanji used

Mahito (written: 真人) is a masculine Japanese given name. Notable people with the name include:

- Awata no Mahito (粟田 真人; died 719), Japanese noble
- Mahito Haga (芳賀 真人; 1908–1939), Japanese gymnast
- Mahito Ōba (大場 真人; born 1961), Japanese voice actor
- Mahito Tsujimura (辻村 真人; 1930–2018), Japanese actor and voice actor
- Mahito Yokota (横田 真人), Japanese composer and orchestrator
- Mahito (マヒト), a major antagonist from the manga and anime series Jujutsu Kaisen
