= Kokka Taikan =

The Kokka Taikan (国歌大観) is a compilation encyclopedia of Japanese waka poetry early and modern, also serving as the de facto academic indexing system for poetry about which little is known. It is published by Kadokawa Gakugei Shuppan.

In academic literature or literary criticism, the Kokka taikan reference number is more likely to be provided for poems by unknown or anonymous authors or when the year or location is unknown. For example, where records of poetry competitions in notable households are harvested, only a period and the location may be known; these poems may be valuable if referenced by masterpieces from the same or rival literary group.

== Compilation and extent ==
The 2012 2nd edition of the Kokka Taikan comprises over 450,000 Japanese and Chinese poems.

The original encyclopedia, encompassing only Japanese poetry, was compiled by Matsushita Daisaburo and Fumio Watanabe and published between 1901 and 1903. Continuation volumes were published between 1925 and 1926. The reference numbers for these volumes continued in sequence but are marked in referencing with zoku Kokka taikan. The encyclopedia was published by Kadokawa from 1983.

The current 2nd edition, published in 2012, is expanded with reference number continuing in sequence and is available on DVD-ROM.

== Other collections ==
More long established collections can be seen as coherently delimited collections. The Kokka taikan can be viewed as the miscellany, aiming to contain poetry outside the long established collections:

- Man'yōshū: the very ancient Japanese poetry collated during the Nara period.
- Monogatari: the 40 or so longer tales that survive from the Heian and Kamakura periods.
- Nijūichidaishū: the 21 imperial anthologies of Japanese court poetry.
