= Archives and Mausolea Department =

Division of Imperial Household Agency

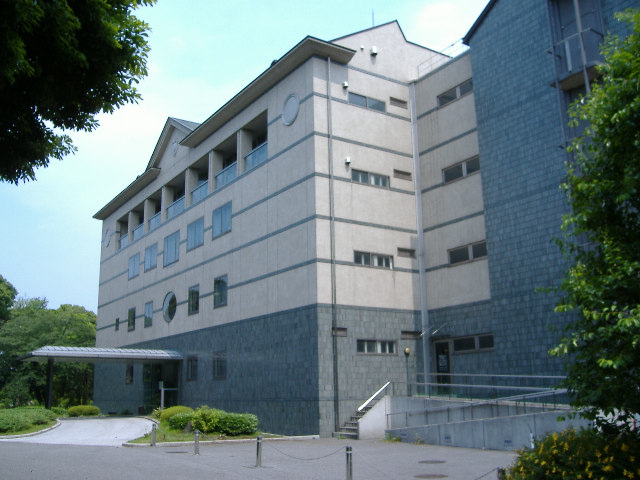
Archives and Mausolea Department of the Imperial Household Agency, Tokyo Imperial Palace

The Archives and Mausolea Department (Japanese: 書陵部, Hepburn: Shoryō-bu) is a division of the Imperial Household Agency of Japan. The department is headed by a Director-General and consists of the following divisions: the Archives Division, the Compiling Division, and the Imperial Mausolea and Tombs Division. The department's headquarters are at the Tokyo Imperial Palace. In addition, there are five regional offices at Tama, Momoyama, Tsukinowa, Unebi and Furuichi.
