= Kashū (poetry) =

Collection of waka poems

A kashū (家集), also called a shikashū (私家集) or ie-no-shū (家の集), is a private collection of waka poems compiled by the author of the poems included. The term is used in contrast to chokusenshū, imperially-commissioned collections both written and compiled by multiple people, and shisenshū (私撰集), anthologies of poems by multiple poets privately compiled by a single editor.

== List of kashū ==
- Kakinomoto no Ason Hitomaro Kashū (before 759)
- Saigū no Nyōgo Shū (after 985)
- Okikaze-shū (after the tenth century)
- Sankashū (c. 1180)
- Kojijū-shū (c. 1181)
- Nijōin no Sanuki Shū (c. 1182)

== Bibliography ==
- Keene, Donald (1999). A History of Japanese Literature, Vol. 1: Seeds in the Heart — Japanese Literature from Earliest Times to the Late Sixteenth Century. New York: Columbia University Press. ISBN 978-0-231-11441-7.
- McMillan, Peter. 2010 (1st ed. 2008). One Hundred Poets, One Poem Each. New York: Columbia University Press.
