= Yuan Jie =

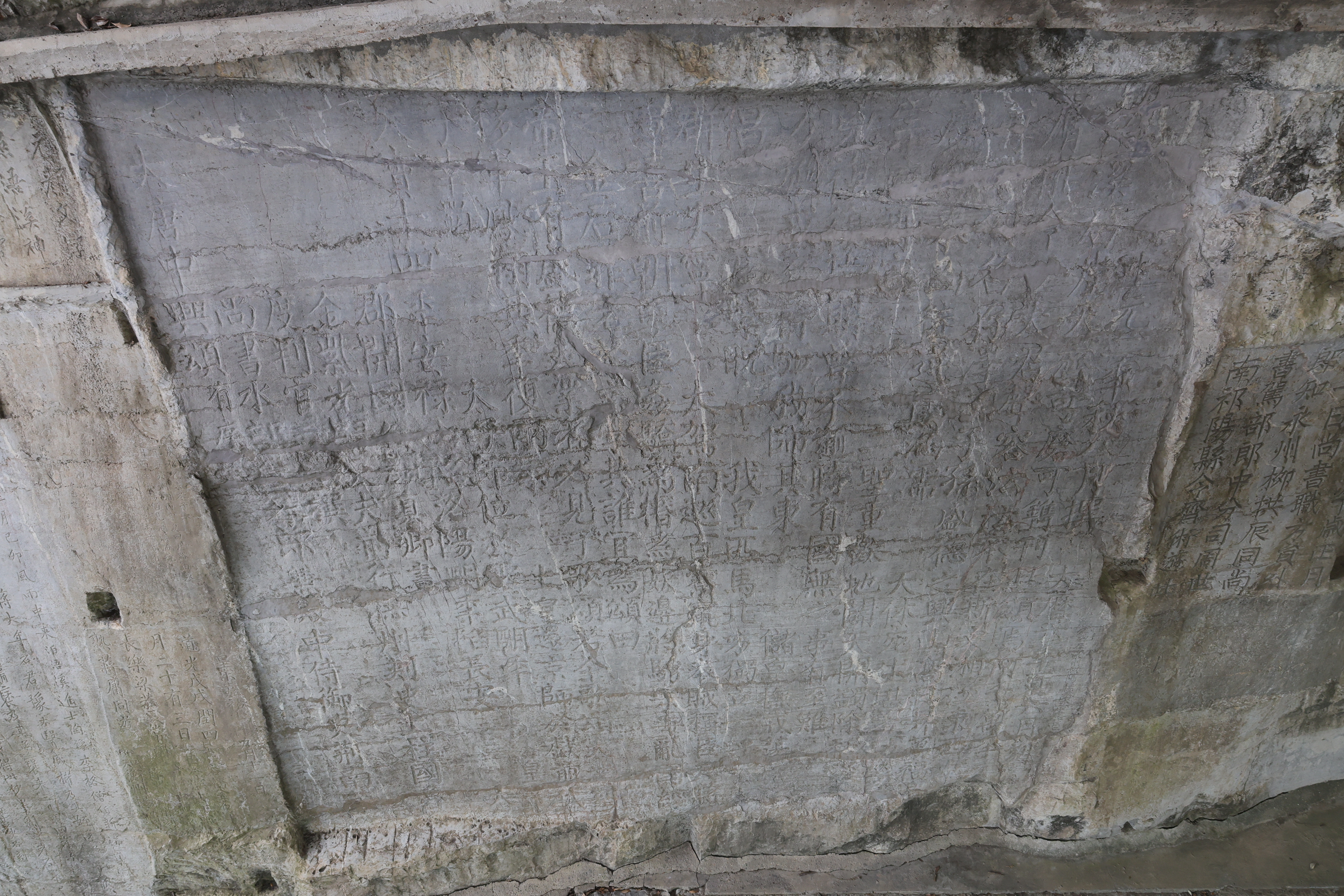
- Ode to the Restoration of the Great Tang dynasty. Yuan Jie's representative work, inscribed on a cliff at Wuxi Stele Forest of Qiyang.
- Traditional Chinese: 元結
- Simplified Chinese: 元结
- Literal meaning: (given name)
Transcriptions
Standard Mandarin
- Hanyu Pinyin: Yuán Jiē
- Wade–Giles: Yüan^{2} Chieh^{1}

Alternative Chinese name
- Chinese: 次山
- Literal meaning: (courtesy name)
Transcriptions
Standard Mandarin
- Hanyu Pinyin: Cìshān
- Wade–Giles: Tz'u^{4}shan^{1}

Second alternative Chinese name
- Chinese: 漫郎
- Literal meaning: (art name)
Transcriptions
Standard Mandarin
- Hanyu Pinyin: Mànláng
- Wade–Giles: Man^{4}lang^{2}

Third alternative Chinese name
- Chinese: 聱叟
- Literal meaning: (art name)
Transcriptions
Standard Mandarin
- Hanyu Pinyin: Áosǒu
- Wade–Giles: Ao^{2}sou^{3}

Fourth alternative Chinese name
- Chinese: 琦玕子
- Literal meaning: (art name)
Transcriptions
Standard Mandarin
- Hanyu Pinyin: Qígānzǐ
- Wade–Giles: Ch'ih^{2}kan^{1}tzu^{3}

Yuan Jie (719/723–772) was a Chinese poet and man of letters of the mid-Tang period. His courtesy name was Cishan, and he had several art names (see below).

He attained a jinshi degree in the imperial examination in 754, and served in several regional government posts before resigning in 769.

Among his most famous poems is the "Zei Tui Shi Guanli", which describes the state of the countryside following the An Lushan Rebellion, which he experienced first-hand. He also compiled a collection of poetry by his contemporaries, the Qie-zhong Ji, and was noted for his prose compositions. Books 240 and 241 of the Quan Tangshi are devoted to his poetry.

== Biography ==
Yuan Jie was born in either 719 or 723, in Wuchang (modern-day Wuhan, Hubei Province), Lu (modern Lushan County, Henan) or Henan (modern Luoyang, Henan Province).

He attained a jinshi degree in the imperial examination in 754, and was involved in the putting down of the An Lushan Rebellion. In 763 he was appointed governor of Dao Prefecture, and in 768 he moved to Rong Prefecture, but during this time he came to resent the heavy taxes that his position forced him to levy on the peasants, and in 769, following the death of his mother, he resigned his post.

He died in 772.

== Names ==
His courtesy name was Cishan, and his art names included Manlang, Aosou, and Qiganzi.

== Poetry ==
There is a ten-volume, Ming-era anthology of his poetry called the Yuan Cishan Ji (Chinese: 元次山集; pinyin: Yuán Cìshān-jí; Wade–Giles: Yüan^{2} Tz'u^{4}shan^{1} Chi^{1}; lit. 'Yuan Cishan Anthology').

His wuyan gushi poem "Zei Tui Shi Guanli" (simplified Chinese: 贼退示官吏; traditional Chinese: 賊退示官吏; pinyin: zéi tuì shì guānlì), which he wrote while stationed in Dao Prefecture and which describes the state of society immediately following An Lushan's rebellion, was highly praised by Du Fu, and is seen as a forerunner of the works of Bai Juyi.

He also compiled the Qie-zhong Ji (simplified Chinese: 箧中集; traditional Chinese: 篋中集; pinyin: Qiè-zhōng jí; Wade–Giles: Ch'ieh^{4}-chung^{1} chi^{2}; lit. 'Out of the Book-Bin'), a 760 collection of 24 poems by seven of his contemporaries, whose moral temper he admired but who did not hold official position.

== Prose ==
He is often listed alongside Xiao Yingshi and Li Hua as a forerunner of the gu wen (Chinese: 古文; pinyin: gū-wén; Wade–Giles: ku^{1}-wen^{2}; lit. 'ancient prose') movement.

== Cited works ==
- Arai, Ken (1988). "Yuan Jie (Gen Ketsu in Japanese)". World Encyclopedia (in Japanese). Heibonsha. Archived from the original on 2016-11-11.
- "Yuan Jie (Gen Ketsu in Japanese)". Britannica Kokusai Dai-Hyakkajiten (in Japanese). Encyclopædia Britannica, Inc. 2014. Archived from the original on 2016-11-11.
- "Yuan Jie (Gen Ketsu in Japanese)". Daijirin (in Japanese). Sanseido. 1988. Archived from the original on 2016-11-11.
- Ichikawa, Momoko (1994). "Yuan Jie (Gen Ketsu in Japanese)". Encyclopedia Nipponica (in Japanese). Shogakukan. Archived from the original on 2016-11-11.
- Kroll, Paul W. "Chapter 14: Poetry of the T'ang Dynasty". In Mair (2001).
- Mair, Victor H., ed. (2001). The Columbia History of Chinese Literature. New York: Columbia University Press. ISBN 0-231-10984-9. (Amazon Kindle edition.)
- Ueki, Hisayuki; Uno, Naoto; Matsubara, Akira (1999). "Shijin to Shi no Shōgai (So Ei)". In Matsuura, Tomohisa (ed.). Kanshi no Jiten 漢詩の事典 (in Japanese). Vol. 1. Tokyo: Taishūkan Shoten. p. 102. OCLC 41025662.
