= Ono no Minemori =

Japanese poet and politician (778–830)

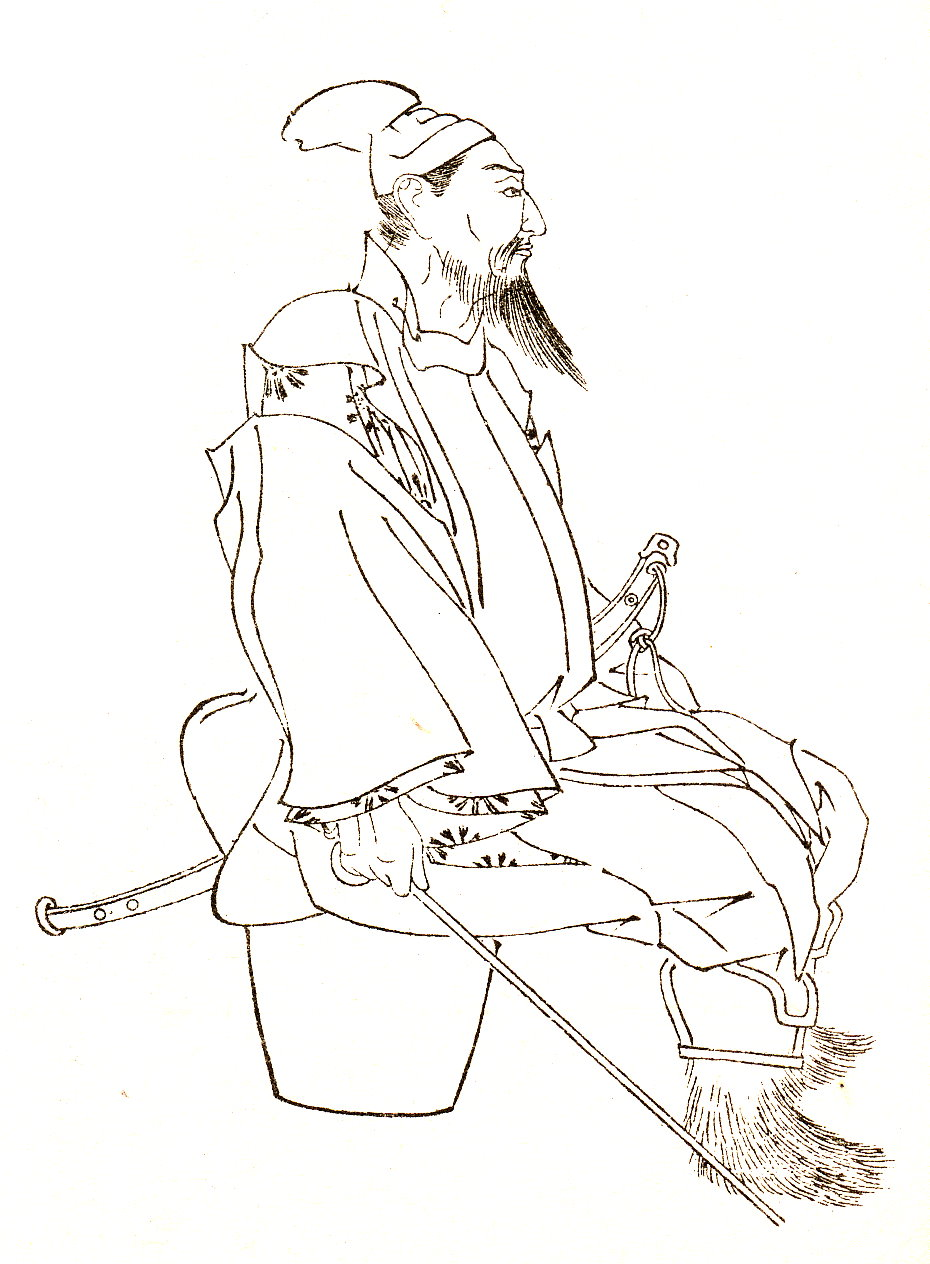
Ono no Minemori

Ono no Minemori (小野 岑守; 778–830) was a Japanese historian, poet, and politician of the early Heian period. He wrote in the kanshi style of poetry.

== Biography ==
Ono no Minemori was born in 778. He was the third son of Ono no Nagami, the fuku-shōgun.

He was a trusted attendant of Emperor Saga from the time the latter was crown prince. In 808 he was promoted to the position of tōgū shōji (春宮少進), and went on to serve in positions such as shōgeki (少外記) and shikibu shōyū (式部少輔), as well as serving in various provincial governments such as those of Ōmi Province, Mino Province, Mutsu Province, Awa Province, and ultimately, in 822, vice-governor of the Dazaifu (大宰大弐, dazai no daini).

He demonstrated his skill as an administrator the following year when, he introduced reforms allowing the farming of government-owned rice paddies in the Dazaifu to relieve the burden of the peasants under his administration. He also directed the construction of the Zokukmyō-in (続命院), a rest stop for visitors to the Dazaifu.

He was the father of Ono no Takamura.

He died on the nineteenth day of the fourth month of the seventh year of Tenchō (14 May 830 in the Gregorian calendar).

== Writings ==
Ono no Minemori was one of the compilers of the Ryōun-shū, an anthology of Japanese kanshi (poems in Classical Chinese) and drafted the preface to the collection. Thirteen of his poems were included in the Ryōun-shū, eight in the Bunka Shūrei-shū, and nine in the Keikoku-shū. Their shared poetic skill brought him in contact with the monk Kūkai.

In his later years, he helped compile the Nihon Kōki, one of the so-called Six National Histories. He also participated in the compilation of the Dairi-shiki.

Many of his poems were composed on the direct orders of the Emperor of Japan, notably Emperor Saga. His poetic style shows the influence of Six Dynasties poetry.

== Works cited ==
- Kinpara, Tadashi (1994). "Ono no Minemori". Encyclopedia Nipponica (in Japanese). Shogakukan.
- Takinami, Sadako (1994). "Ono no Minemori" 小野岑守. Asahi Nihon Rekishi Jinbutsu Jiten (in Japanese). Asahi Shinbun-sha.
- "Ono no Minemori" 小野岑守. World Encyclopedia (in Japanese). Heibonsha. 1998.
