= St. Norbert College =

Catholic college in De Pere, Wisconsin, US

Coordinates: 44.4453°N 88.0685°W

- Motto: Docere Verbo et Exemplo
- Motto in English: To teach by word and example
- Type: Private liberal arts college
- Established: 1898; 128 years ago
- Affiliations: ACCU; WAICU; CIC
- Religious affiliation: Roman Catholic (Order of Canons Regular of Prémontré)
- Endowment: $204 million (2025)
- President: Laurie Joyner
- Faculty: 130 full-time, 32 part-time (fall 2022)
- Students: 1,757 (fall 2024)
- Undergraduates: 1,695 (fall 2024)
- Postgraduates: 62 (fall 2024)
- Location: De Pere, Wisconsin, U.S.
- Campus: Suburban
- Colors: Green and gold
- Nickname: Green Knights
- Sporting affiliations: NCAA Division III – Northern Athletics Collegiate Conference
- Website: snc.edu

St. Norbert College (SNC) is a private Norbertine liberal arts college in De Pere, Wisconsin, United States. Founded in October 1898 by Abbot Bernard Pennings, a Norbertine priest and educator, the school was named after Saint Norbert of Xanten. In 1952, the college became coeducational. As of April 2023, the school's enrollment is 2,009 students.

== History ==
St. Norbert College was established when Abbot Bernard Pennings, a Dutch immigrant priest from the Premonstratensian Berne Abbey of Heeswijk, the Netherlands, founded the college to train young men for the priesthood. Francis Ignatius Van Dyke, a seminarian, was the first and, at the time, only student. St. Norbert is the world's first and only institution of higher learning sponsored by the Premonstratensian order. Pennings later started a commerce program at the college for lay students before retiring in 1955.

St. Norbert's second president, Dennis Burke, expanded the college, anticipating the student population would eventually reach 2,000. Robert Christin, who became president in 1968, implemented the current course system and the academic divisional structure. In 1973, Neil Webb, a former faculty member and vice president, became president. Webb established the first permanent endowment for the school. Serving as the college's president from 1983 to 2000, Thomas Manion led the expansion of facilities and the development of additional academic programs. Enrollment topped 2,000. Thomas Kunkel, former dean of the Philip Merrill College of Journalism at the University of Maryland, College Park, became the college's seventh president in 2008. Since then, the college has constructed the Mulva Family Fitness & Sports Center, the Gehl-Mulva Science Center, the Cassandra Voss Center, Michels Commons, Schneider Stadium, the Mulva Library, Gries Hall, Ariens Family Welcome Center and Todd Wehr Hall.

Brian J. Bruess, a 1990 graduate of St. Norbert College and former executive vice president and chief operating officer of St. Catherine University in St. Paul, Minnesota, became president in 2017. Although he announced on November 1, 2019, that he would not continue as president after the end of the 2019–20 academic year, uproar from the college community led to further discussion between Bruess and the SNC Board of Trustees that resulted in a multiyear contract. Four members of the board, including the chair, resigned shortly thereafter. In March 2022, Bruess announced his appointment as the inaugural president of the College of Saint Benedict and Saint John's University, beginning in July 2022. Kunkel returned to serve as interim president for the 2022–23 academic year. Laurie Joyner became St. Norbert College's ninth president, and the college's first female president, in July 2023.

== Campus ==
The campus consists of 111 acres (45 ha), much of which borders the Fox River. As a residential campus, students typically walk to classes year-round. The many trees and statues on campus provide a scenic view, especially in fall, when the foliage changes colors. Directly behind the Campus Center is a pavilion and marina where St. Norbert hosts a picnic for students to kick off the school year. This shoreline area is also the venue for "Knights on the Fox" – a free summer concert series open to the community.

Important social buildings include the Ray Van Den Heuvel Family Campus Center (Campus Center), which includes a fitness center, gymnasium, and diner (Phil's Diner) and a reading lounge with a picturesque view overlooking the Fox River. There is also an events hall for movies and public speakers. Special events put on by student groups are also held there, such as comedian appearances and awareness speeches.

Old St. Joseph Church, which is still an active church, was built in 1890 and renovated in 1998. It is located on the site of a former mission chapel that was erected for early settlers by the French-born Jesuit priest Rev. Charles Albane in 1676. The chapel stood for nearly 200 years. An all-wood structure was built in 1870, but it burned to the ground after a lightning strike in 1889. It was rebuilt in its current form as a brick structure in 1890. The church contains a statue/shrine of Saint Joseph that was crowned by Pope Leo XIII in 1891. Novena devotions are held on Wednesday.

The old St. Boniface Church (built in 1883) is owned by St. Norbert College. In 2013, it was renamed Dudley Birder Hall in honor of longtime St. Norbert College music professor, Dudley Birder. It was also converted into a performance arts center following a $1.7 million renovation. It is used for recitals, chamber concerts, Dudley Birder Chorale rehearsals, and public lectures.

Much of the campus is in the St. Norbert College Historic District.

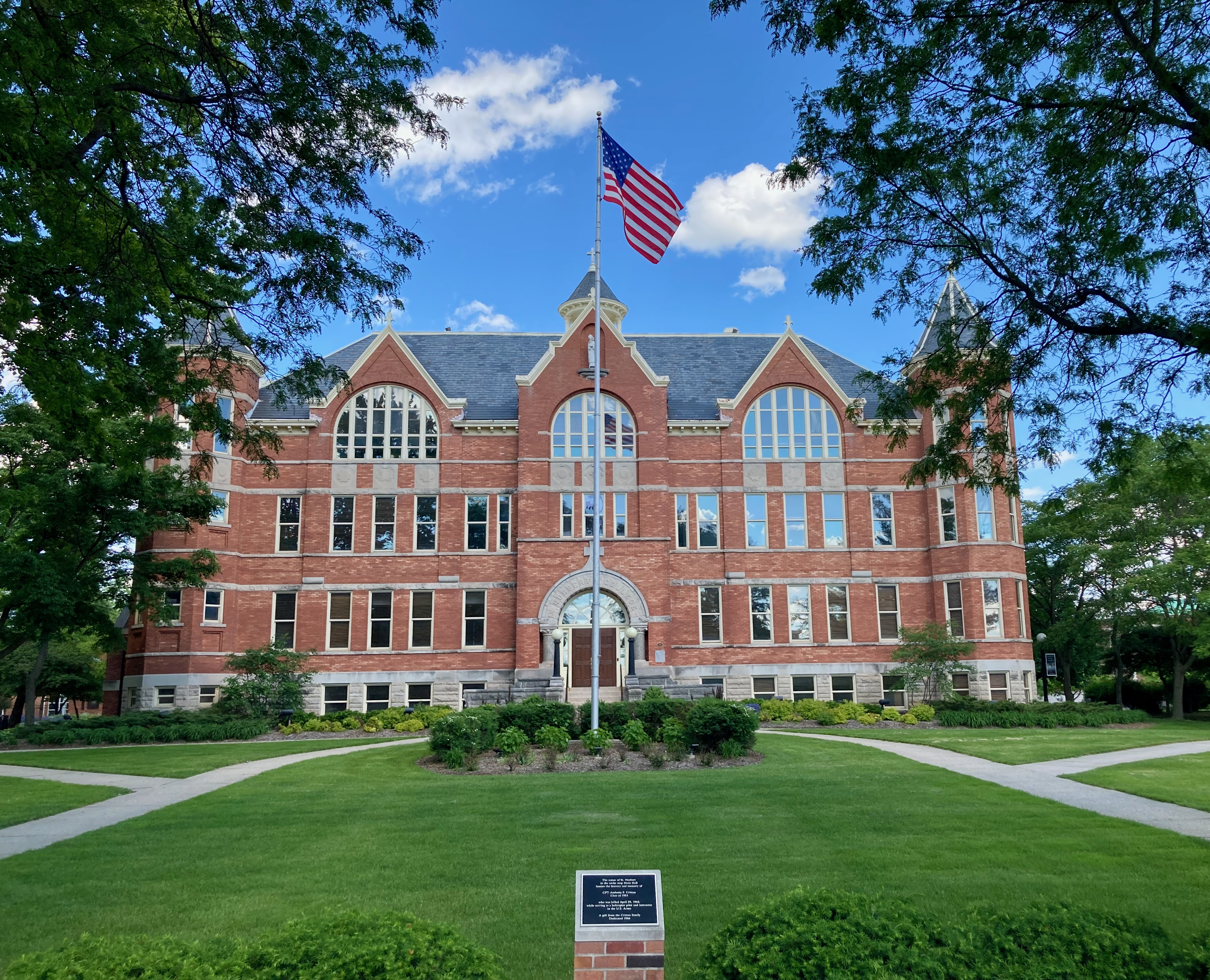
The Main Hall was built in 1903

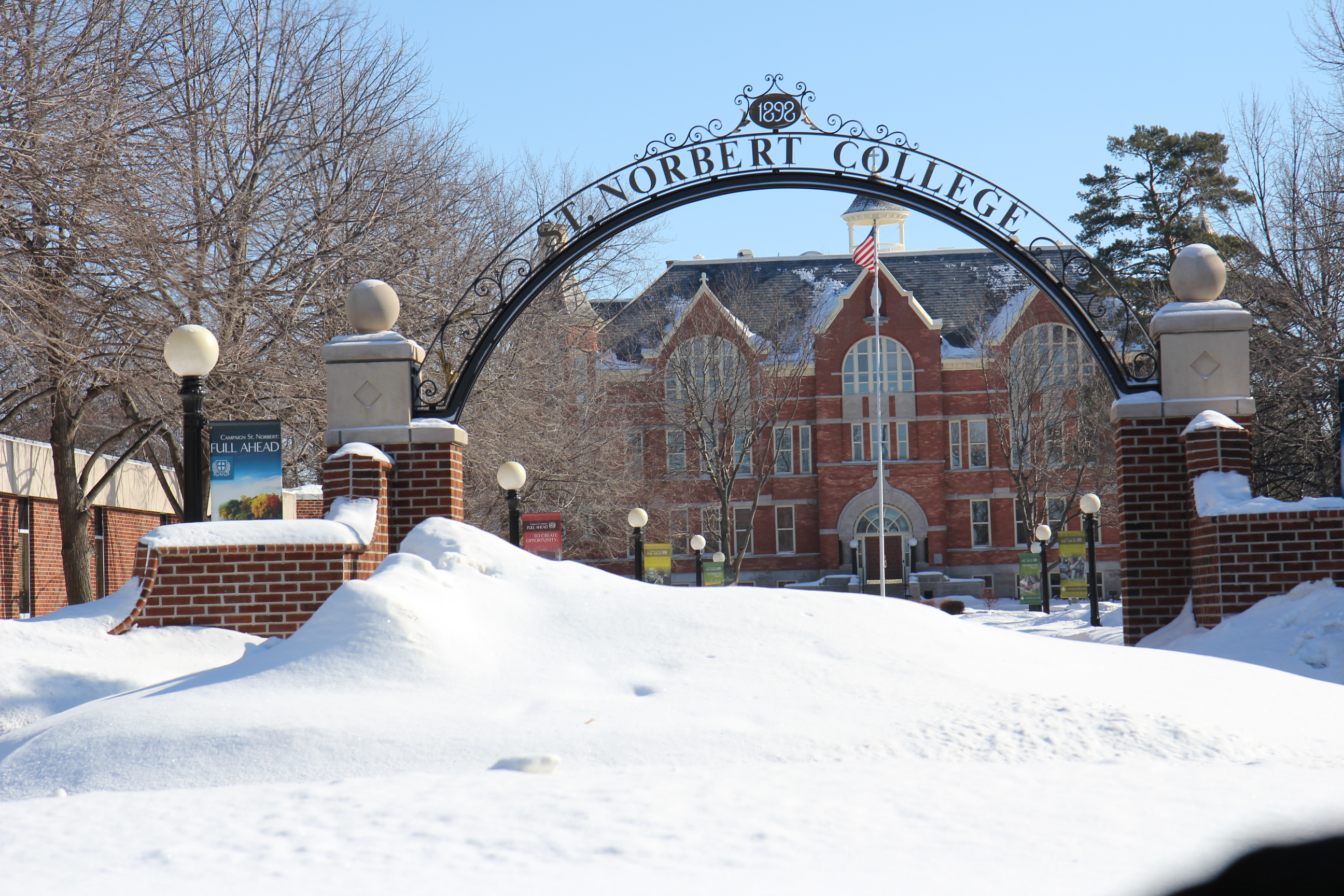
The entrance arch to Baer Mall and Main Hall

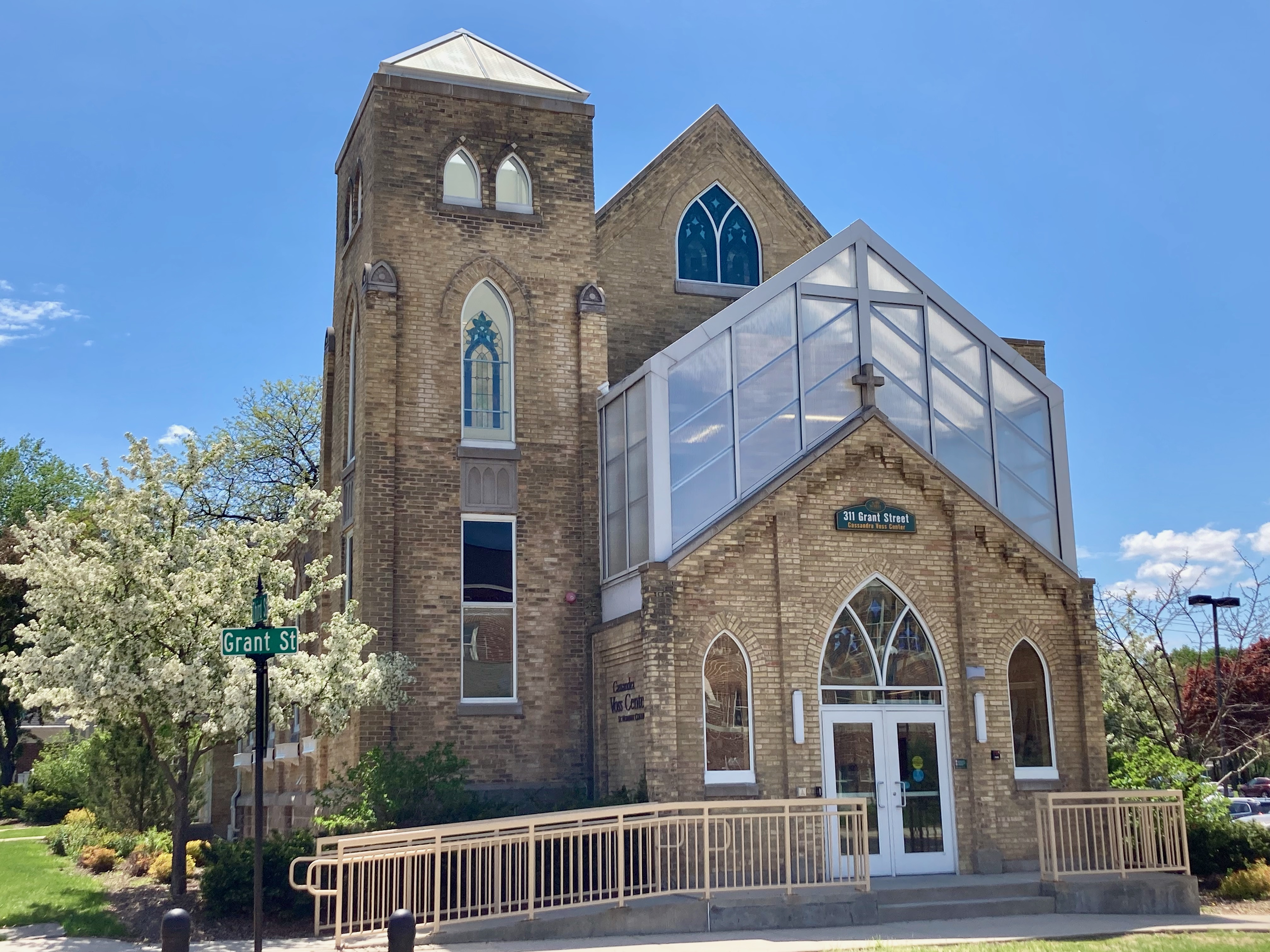
Cassandra Voss Center

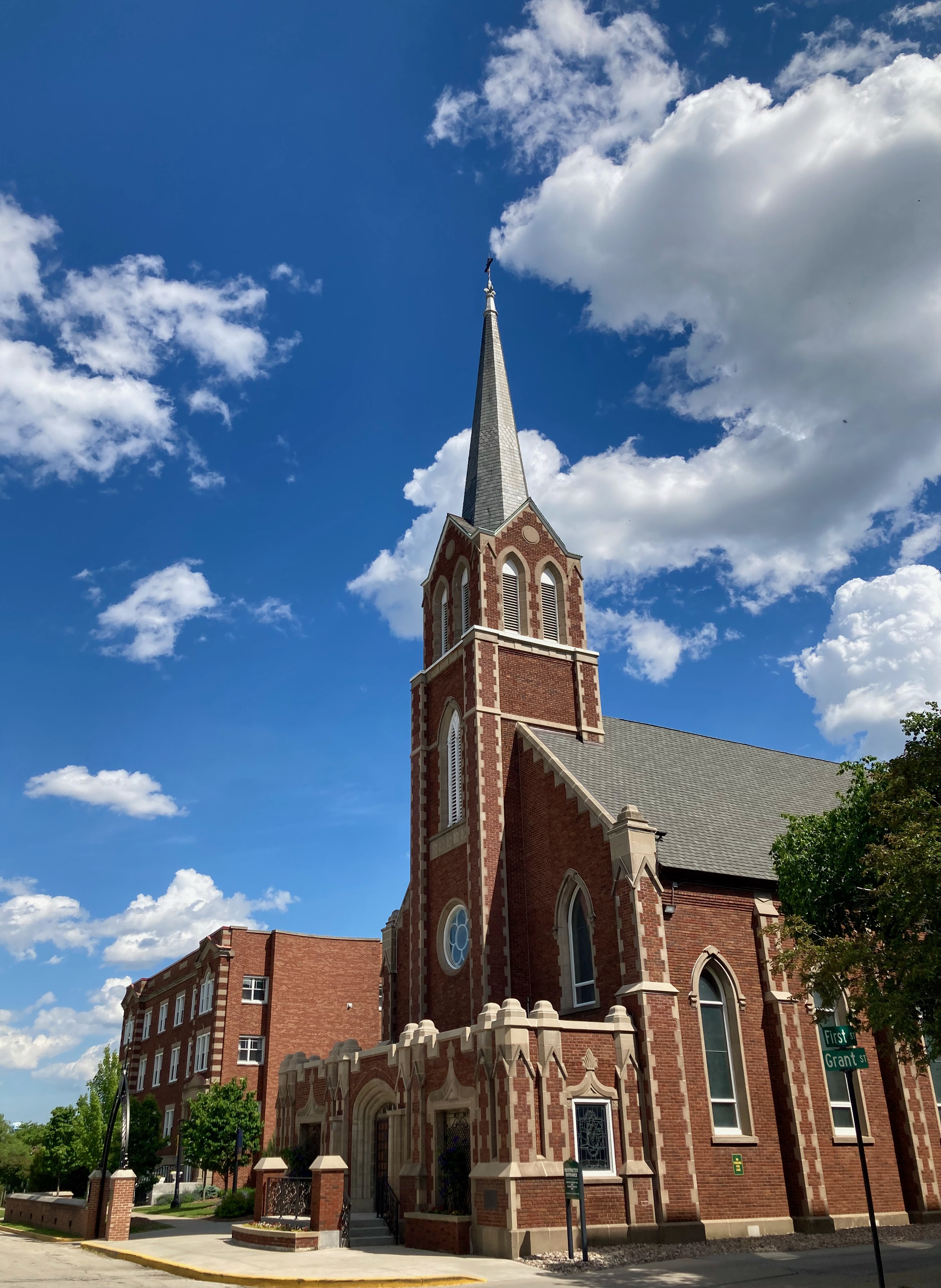
Old St. Joseph Church

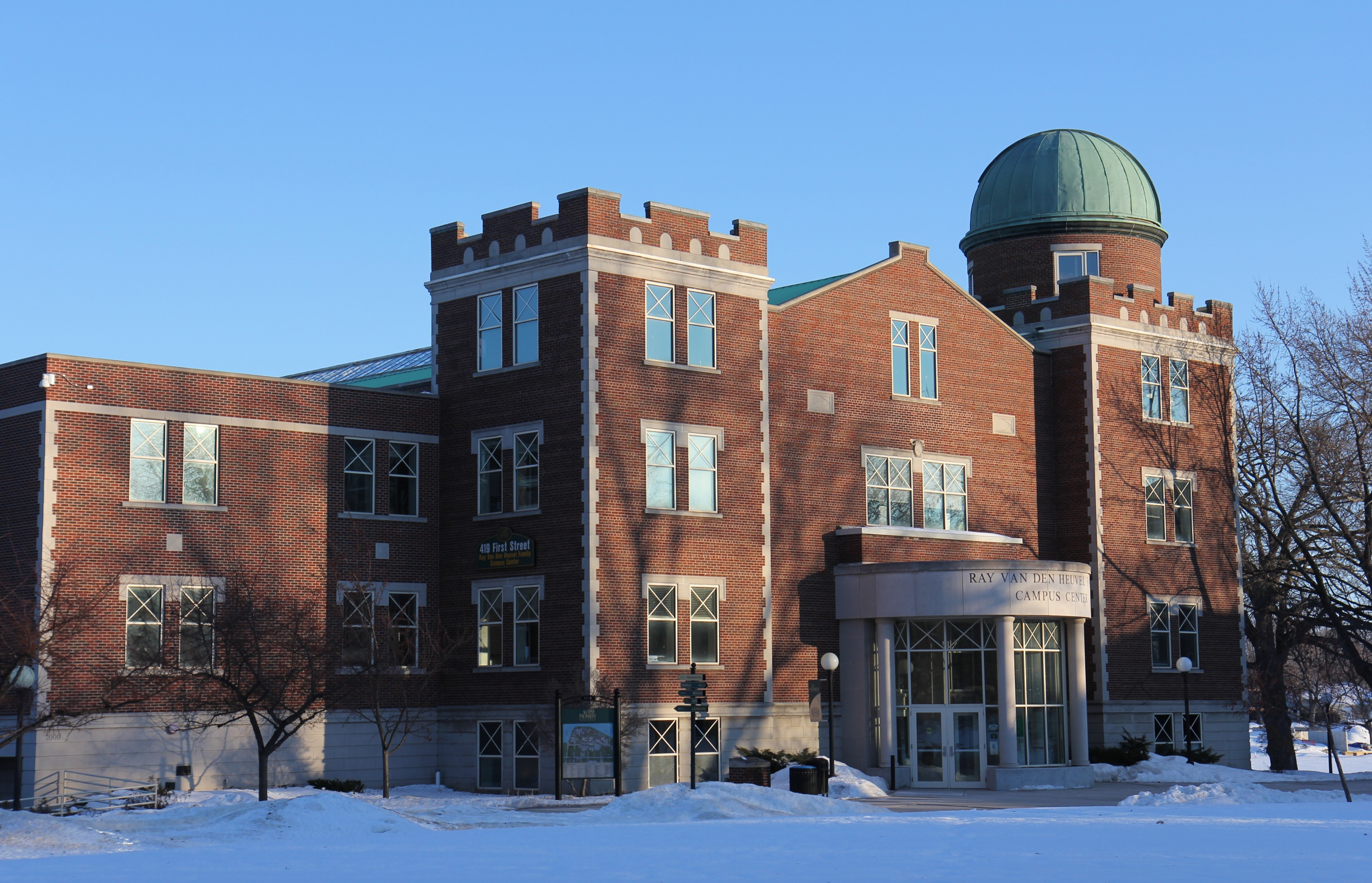
Van Den Heuvel Campus center

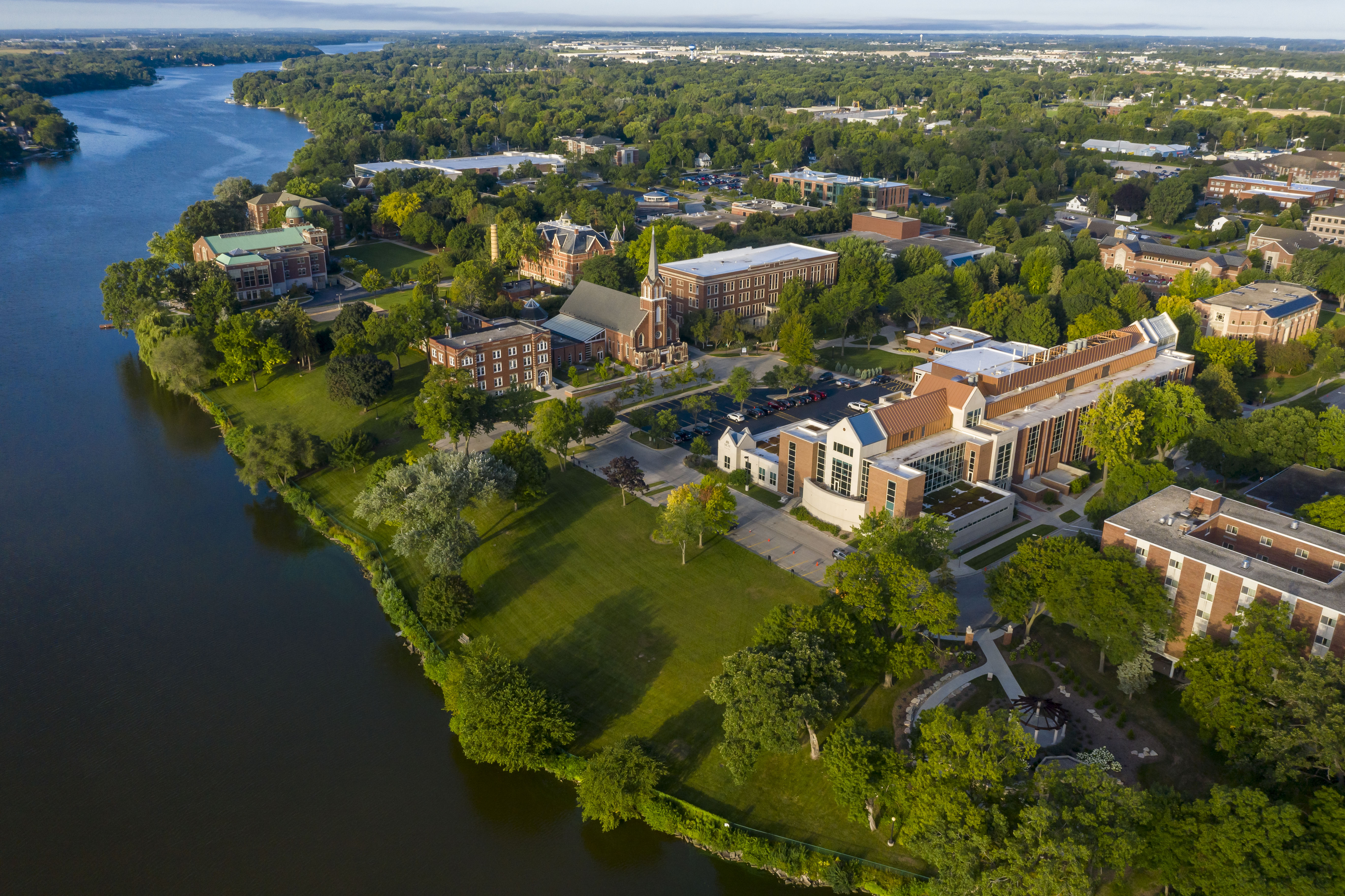
Aerial view of St. Norbert College

== Academics ==
St. Norbert College offers undergraduate programs in more than 80 areas of study, leading to a Bachelor of Arts, Bachelor of Science, Bachelor of Music, or Bachelor of Business Administration degree. A Bachelor of Science in Nursing degree is also offered through a joint effort with the Bellin College of Nursing. The most popular undergraduate majors are business administration, biology, and education.

In addition to its undergraduate offerings, St. Norbert College offers three master's-level graduate programs in business administration, theological studies and liberal studies. The Master of Theological Studies department hosts a branch program in Albuquerque, New Mexico, where program studies take place at the Norbertine Abbey of Santa Maria de la Vid. Students on that campus can earn the full M.T.S. degree. In 2015, the college began offering an MBA program through its new Donald J. Schneider School of Business & Economics. The Medical College of Wisconsin's Green Bay campus, which serves the northeast Wisconsin region, is in the new Gehl-Mulva Science Center at St. Norbert.

In the 2025 U.S. News & World Report college rankings, St. Norbert was ranked 90th (tied) of 211 liberal arts colleges nationwide. The college is also ranked 118th among "Liberal Arts Universities" in Forbes's 2019 list of America's Best Colleges.

The Mulva Library provides digital and in-person reference services; hosts the Digital Commons, an institutional repository of documents, media, and other materials online; and provides a makerspace with technologies for the academic community. It is the home of the Center for Norbertine Studies, the international center of research on the Premonstratensians and Norbertines. The library also holds the college archives and the college's café (Ed's Café).

== Student life ==
=== Student housing ===
About 86% of students live on campus in residence halls, apartments and townhouses. St. Norbert requires all traditional undergraduate students not registered as commuters to live on campus. Freshman housing includes three traditional residence hall options: Madelaine-Lorraine Hall (co-ed), Sensenbrenner Hall (Co-ed), and Bergstrom Hall (co-ed Honors students). Campus housing options for sophomores include Mary Minahan McCormick Hall, Michels Hall, and Victor McCormick Hall. Upperclassmen enjoy single-person dorm rooms such as Burke Hall, the Townhouses and Carriage House (apartment-like housing), college-owned houses and college-owned apartments, including Gries, Xanten and Prémontré Halls.

=== Student involvement ===
There are more than 100 registered student clubs and organizations on campus. St. Norbert encourages its students to become involved in their community through community service and by participating in one of the 15 fraternities, sororities, and independent social groups. The school also has eight National Honor Society chapters, two student publications, and eight musical and performance ensembles. A major activity that St. Norbert students participate in is the annual "Into The Streets" community service project that provides service to organizations in De Pere and neighboring communities. This event is staffed by first-year students, staff and faculty, and is part of the First-Year Experience program.

In 2013, the old St. John's Lutheran Church (originally built in 1932) was reopened as the Cassandra Voss Center following a $2.7 million renovation. It was named after former St. Norbert College student Cassandra Voss, who died in a car accident at age 21. Before her death, she was on track to become St. Norbert College's first student to graduate with a major in women's and gender studies. The building now features offices, study space, performance space, a kitchen, a classroom, and a library. The Cassandra Voss Center offers a variety of programs "exploring intersectional issues of identity and inclusion" and "fostering dialogue on topics related to justice and identity including racism, sexism, homophobia, and classism".

=== Greek life ===
Greek life at St. Norbert includes four sororities and three fraternities, as well as two Greek governing groups. Greek groups sponsor fund-raising activities, food drives, and benefits to support charities. Greek groups collectively completed a total of 2,117 hours of service and raised $9,638 for their respective philanthropies during the 2015–16 school year. There are three fraternities and four sororities on the St. Norbert campus.

== Athletics ==
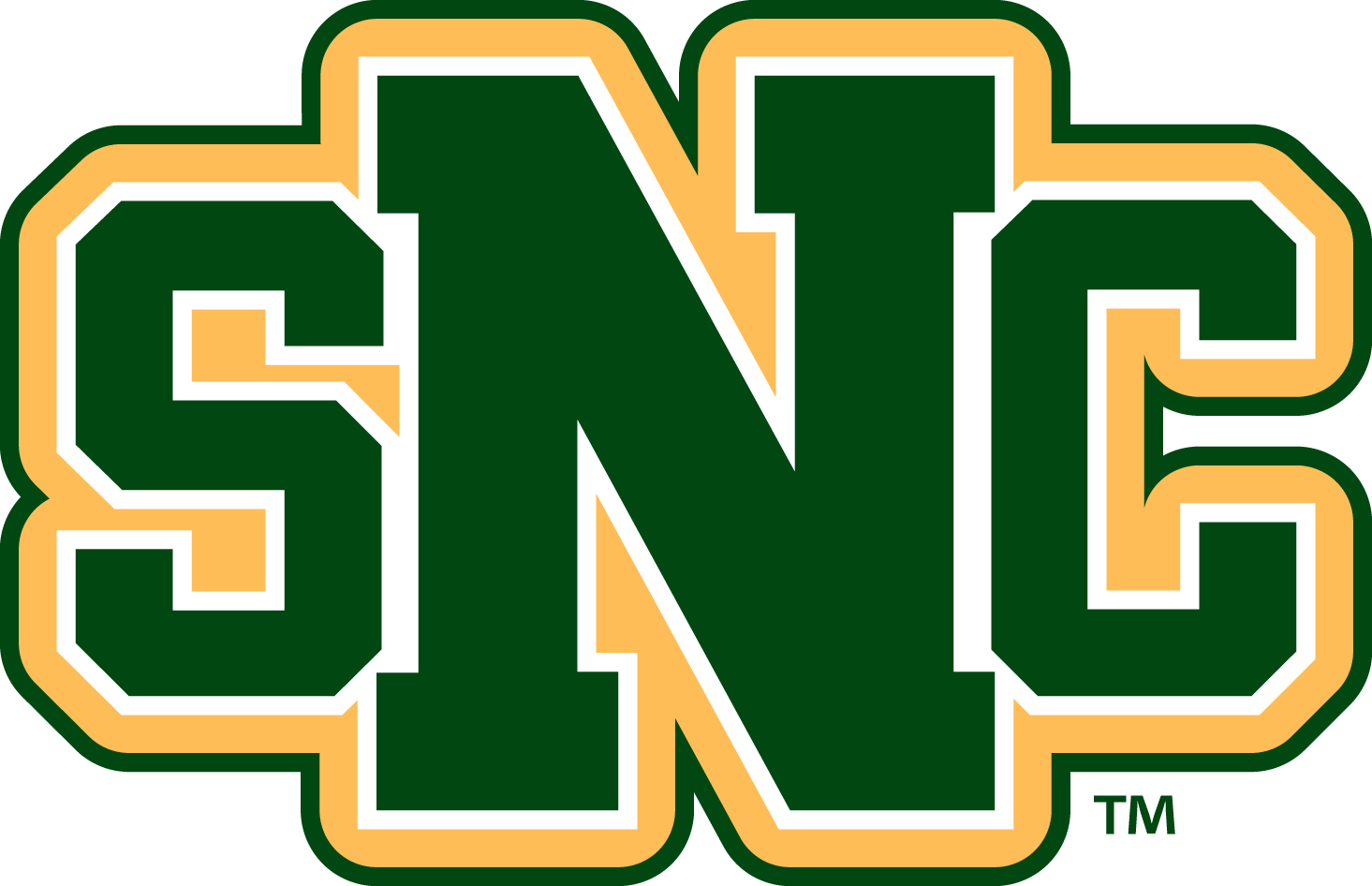
St. Norbert athletics logo

The St. Norbert College Green Knights participate in NCAA Division III athletics and were members of the Midwest Conference from 1982 through the 2020–21 season. In fall 2021, they joined the Northern Athletic Collegiate Conference. St. Norbert offers 23 varsity sports including: football, men's and women's volleyball, men's and women's soccer, men's and women's golf, men's and women's tennis, men's and women's cross country, men's and women's basketball, men's and women's hockey, men's and women's swimming and diving, softball, baseball, men's and women's track and field, cheerleading, and dance.

The Green Knights men's hockey team has appeared in 19 NCAA Division III Tournaments since 1997. The team has 12 Frozen Four appearances and won the national championship in 2008, 2011, 2012, 2014 and 2018, while placing as national runner-up in 2004, 2006, 2010 and 2016.

The Green Knights football team has won 17 Midwest Conference championships since joining the league in 1984.

=== Green Bay Packers training camp ===
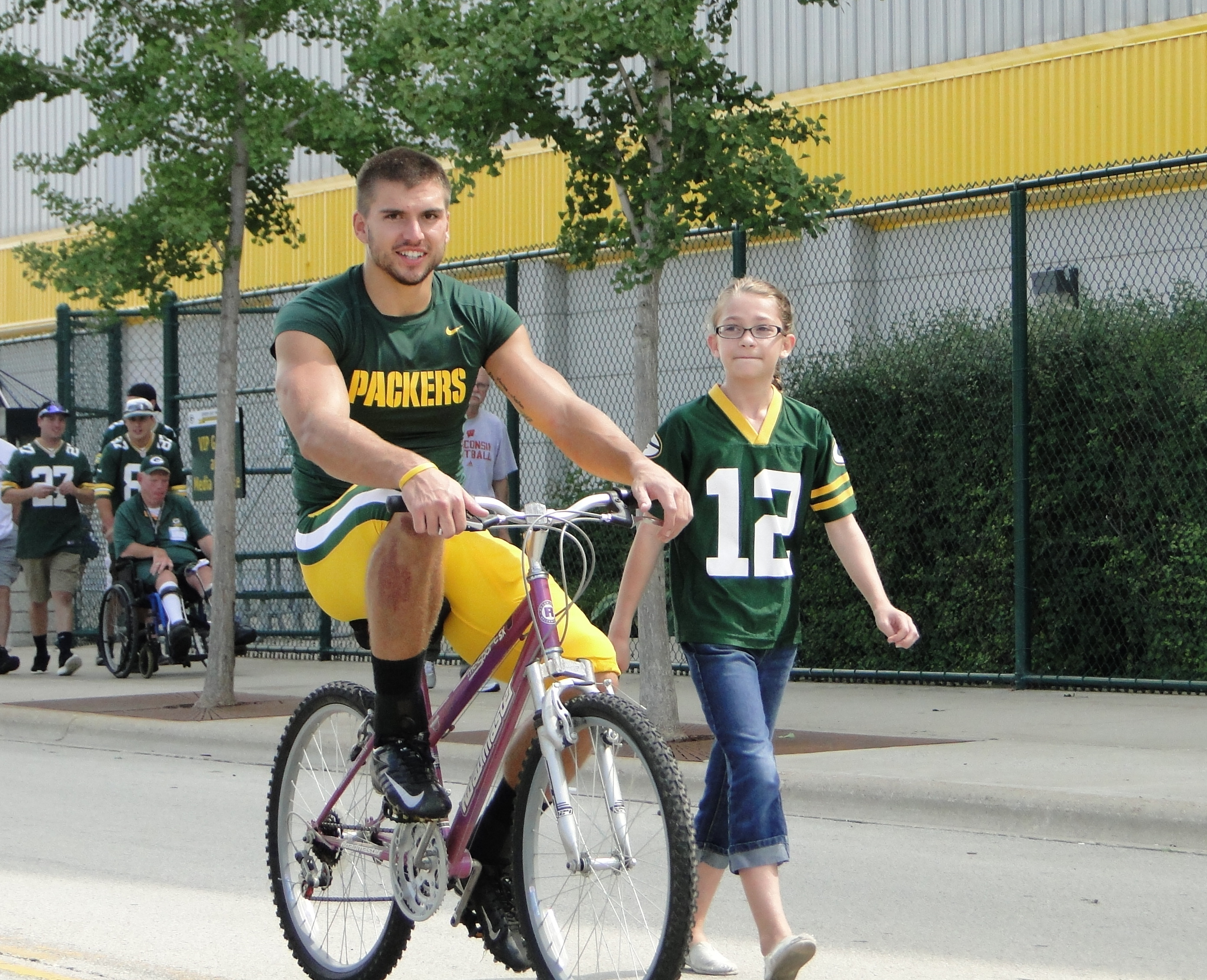
The tradition of Packers' players riding kids bikes to training camp started during the team's time at St. Norbert.

From 1958 to 2019, the Green Bay Packers conducted their annual training camp on St. Norbert's campus. The relationship began in 1957, when the team approached the college about relocating from the University of Wisconsin–Stevens Point, where they had been since 1954. The connection with St. Norbert's grew after the arrival of Vince Lombardi in 1959. Lombardi often attended mass at a church on campus and befriended St. Norbert's president, Rev. Dennis Burke. St. Norbert's was primarily used as the residential headquarters of training camp, with the players staying in college dormitories and eating together on campus. Practice would usually occur at the Packers' training facilities or Lambeau Field. The relationship benefited both the college and the Packers: the college provided communal housing and eating, close to Lambeau Field and the Packers' practice facilities, while the college benefited financially and from increased name recognition.

The relationship, which was the longest between a school and an NFL team, changed in 2020 due to the Covid-19 pandemic, as players were not allowed to live together during training camp. The team allowed players back to St. Norbert's dormitories in 2022, but starting in 2023, players either stayed at home or at a local hotel. Training camp at St. Norbert reflected the smalltown culture that the Packers are known for by providing close contact between fans and players, creating a college atmosphere for the players, and starting the well-known tradition of Packers players riding kids bicycles to practice. St. Norbert has been such an important part of the history of the Green Bay Packers that it was added to the Packers Heritage Trail and was the focus of team historian Cliff Christl's book A Championship Team: The Packers and St. Norbert College in the Lombardi Years.

== Notable alumni ==
- Chris Ayers, Hollywood cartoonist, voice actor
- Nicholas J. Bichler, Wisconsin state assemblyman (1935–1942, 1951–52)
- Vernon Biever, photographer and author
- William W. Brash III, Wisconsin Court of Appeals judge
- Spencer Carbery, Washington Capitals head coach (2023)
- Robert John Cornell, member of the United States House of Representatives from Wisconsin (1975–1979)
- N. Patrick Crooks, Wisconsin Supreme Court justice (1996–2015)
- William J. Duffy, Wisconsin jurist and legislator
- Tom Durkin, sportscaster
- James H. Flatley, U.S. Navy vice admiral
- Lawrence J. Fleming, U.S. Air Force Major General
- Ted Fritsch, Jr., football player
- Chester A. Gerlach, Wisconsin State Assemblyman (1972)
- Herbert J. Grover, educator and politician
- John C. Hanley, U.S. Army general
- David E. Hutchison, Wisconsin State Assemblyman (1994–2001)
- Larry Krause, NFL player
- Joe LaFleur, NFL player
- Jill Lannan, Air National Guard Brigadier General
- Myron P. Lotto, Wisconsin State Senator (1969–1973)
- Dale McKenna, Wisconsin State Senator (1969)
- Terry Meeuwsen, television host and Miss America 1973
- R.A.P Ferreira, rapper
- Michael Monfils, mayor of Green Bay (1975–1979)
- William R. Moser, politician and jurist
- Mary Mullarkey, Chief Justice of the Colorado Supreme Court
- Leo P. O'Brien, Wisconsin State Senator (1953–1964)
- Tip O'Neill, NFL player
- Paul J. Rogan, Wisconsin State Assemblyman (1948, 1950) and Senator (1952, 1954)
- Kristi Ross, entrepreneur
- James J. Schmitt, mayor of Green Bay (2003–2019)
- Matt Sloan, film director and comedian, co-creator of Chad Vader
- Andrew H. Van de Ven Scholar, co-developer of the Nominal Group Technique
- Tony Wied, member of the United States House of Representatives (since 2024)
- Tadashi Yamamoto, founder of the Japan Center for International Exchange and the Shimoda Conference
