= Gerald Curtis =

American academic (born 1940)

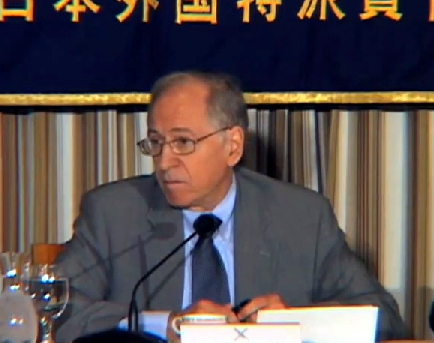
Curtis talked about "General Election Analysis & Japan's Political Future" at the Foreign Correspondents' Club of Japan on August 31, 2009.

Gerald L. Curtis (born September 18, 1940) is an American academic and political scientist interested in comparative politics, Japanese politics, and U.S.-Japan relations.

== Columbia University ==
Curtis was the Burgess Professor of Political Science at Columbia University from 1998 until he retired in December 2015. He is now Burgess Professor Emeritus of Political Science at Columbia. Between 1974 and 1990, Curtis was head of the Weatherhead East Asian Institute (WEAI) at Columbia.

== Academic career ==
- Professor, Department of Political Science, Columbia University, since 1976; Burgess Professor since 1998.
- Visiting Professor, National Graduate Institute for Policy Studies (Tokyo), (2000-20__).
- Director, East Asian Institute, Columbia University (1973–1975, 1977–1984, 1987–1991).
- Director, Center for Korean Research, Columbia University (1990–1991).
- Visiting Professor, Faculty of Law, Keio University (1982–1983).
- Visiting Professor, Faculty of Law, University of Tokyo, 1976–1977.
- Associate Professor, Department of Political Science, Columbia University, 1972–1976.
- Research Associate, Faculty of Law, Keio University, 1971–1972.
- Assistant Professor, Department of Political Science, Columbia University, 1969–1972.
- Lecturer, Department of Political Science, Columbia University, 1968–1969.
- Instructor, Department of Political Science, University of Illinois, 1968.
- Research Associate, East Asian Institute, Columbia University, 1967–1968.

== International academia ==
- Collège de France, Paris.
- Lee Kuan Yew School of Public Policy, Singapore.
- Research Institute for Economy, Trade and Industry, Tokyo.
  - * International Institute of Economic Studies, Tokyo.

== Selected works ==
In a statistical overview derived from writings by and about Gerald Curtis, OCLC/WorldCat encompasses roughly 40+ works in 80+ publications in 5 languages and 5,000+ library holdings.

- Curtis, Gerald L. (2001). Policymaking in Japan: Defining the Role of Politicians. Washington, D.C.: Brookings Institution for the Japan Center for International Exchange (JCIE). [Japanese edition -- (2001). Tokyo: JCIE] ISBN 978-4-88907-062-0 (paper)
- _________. (2000). New Perspectives on U.S.-Japan Relations. Washington, D.C.: Brookings Institution. [Chinese edition -- (2001).]
- __________. (1999). The Logic of Japanese Politics. New York: Columbia University Press. ISBN 978-0-231-10842-3 (cloth) -- ISBN 978-0-231-10843-0 (paper) [Japanese edition -- (2001). Nagata cho Seiji no Kobo. Tokyo: Shinchosha; Korean edition -- (2002). Han’ul.]
- __________. (1996). Nihon No Seiji O Doo Miru Ka (Comparative Perspectives on Japanese Politics). Tokyo: NHK.
- __________. (1994). The United States, Japan and Asia: Challenges for US Policy. New York: W. W. Norton. ISBN 978-0-393-03633-6 (cloth) -- ISBN 978-0-393-96583-4 (paper)
- __________. (1993). Japan's Foreign Policy After the Cold War: Coping with Change. Armonk, New York: M.E. Sharpe. ISBN 978-1-56324-217-5 (cloth)
- __________. (1991). Posuto-Reisen Jidai no Nihon (Japan in the Post Cold War Era). Tokyo: Shinbun Shuppan-kyoku.
- __________. (1989). The Way of Japanese Politics. New York: Columbia University Press. ISBN 978-0-231-06680-8 (cloth) -- ISBN 978-0-231-06681-5 (paper) [Japanese edition -- (1987). Nihongata Seiji No Honshitsu. Tokyo: TBS-Britannica (Ohira Memorial Prize, 1989); Thai edition -- (1998).]
- __________. (1984). The Dynamics of Japanese Politics (Doken Kokka Nippon), with Ishikawa Masumi. Tokyo: Kobunsha.
- __________, (1971). Election Campaigning Japanese Style. New York: Columbia University Press. ISBN 978-0-231-03512-5 (cloth) [reprtined by Kodansha, New York, 1981. ISBN 978-0-87011-630-8 (paper)] [Japanese translation -- Daigishi No Tanjo. Tokyo: Simul Press.]
- _________. 1970). Japanese-American Relations in the Seventies. New York: Columbia Books. [Japanese edition -- (1970). Okinawa Igo no Nichibei Kankei. Tokyo: Simul Press.[

Professor Curtis became a special advisor to Newsweek when the magazine's Japanese language edition was initiated in 1986. When the political events or changes became the news of the day, the editorial staff incorporated Curtis' analysis. The New York Times also incorporates the analysis.

== Professional activities ==
Curtis' current professional activities are varied:

- Research Institute on Trade and Economy, Tokyo—Faculty fellow (2003-20__).
- Graduate Research Institute for Policy Studies, Tokyo—Visiting professor (2000-20__).
- Japan Center for International Exchange (U.S.) -- Board of Directors (1992-20__).
- United States-Japan Foundation—Board of Trustees (1993-20__).
- National Security Archive's U.S. Japan Project, Advisory Board.
- National Institute of Democracy, Advisory Board.
- Foundation for Advanced Information and Research (FAIR), Advisory Board member
- Asian Survey, Editorial Board.
- Newsweek Japan, Senior Editorial Advisor (1986-20__)
- Newsweek Korea, Senior Editorial Advisor (1991-20__).
- Chunichi Shimbun and Tokyo Shimbun, Advisory Board (1982-20__)

Curtis' was formerly involved in the following:

- Columbia University
  - Project on the United States, Japan and Southeast Asia—Executive Director (1984–1986).
  - Project on U.S.-Korean Security Relations—Director (1980–1984).
  - Research Project on the U.S. and Japan in Multilateral Diplomacy—Director (1975–1980).
  - U.S.-Japan Parliamentary Exchange Program—Director (1971–1978).
  - U.S.-Japan Parliamentary Exchange Program—Associate Director (1968–1970).
- Japan Foundation
  - Center for Global Partnership, Advisory Council—Member (1991–2000).
  - American Advisory Committee—Member (1977–1979).
- Asia Society
  - Advisory Group on the Asia Agenda Program—Member (1985–1993).
  - Study Mission to North Korea—Member (1992).
  - US-Japan Consultative Group on Policies Toward the People's Republic of China, Core Group—Member (1990–1992).
  - Program of Japan and the United States in Asia, Advisory Board—Chairman (1983–1986).
- Trilateral Commission—Member.
- Asahi Shimbun, International Advisory Board.
- American Academy of Political Science (AAPS), Board—Member.
- NHK, 12 half-hour programs in Japanese on comparative perspectives on Japanese politics—Author and Narrator (1996).
- American Assembly Conference on the United States and Japan in Asia: Challenges for U.S. Policy—Project Director (1993).
- Kodansha Encyclopedia of Japan, Board of Editors.
- United Nations Association, Panel on Regional Security in East Asia—Member (1986–88).
- Council on Foreign Relations, Study Group on U.S.-Japan Relations—Chairman (1986–1987).
- International Journal of Politics, Contributing Editor (1979–1989).
- Shimoda Conferences on U.S.-Japan Relations, Steering Committee—Member (1969–1990).
- Social Science Research Council (SSRC) and American Council of Learned Societies (ACLS), Joint Committee on Japanese Studies—Chairman (1974–1977).
- Royal Institute of International Affairs (Chatham House) -- Fellow (1976–1977).

== Professional associations ==
Curtis joined the conventional associations:

- American Academy of Political Science (AAPS)
- American Political Science Association (APSA)
- Asia Society
- Association of Asian Studies
- Council on Foreign Relations
- International House of Japan
- Japan Society

== Honors, prizes and awards ==
Curtis' work across the span of his career has garnered recognition:

- Order of the Rising Sun, Gold and Silver Star, 2004 (Japan).
- Japan Foundation Award (2002).
- Chunichi Shimbun Special Achievement Award (1990).
- Masayoshi Ōhira Memorial Prize for The Japanese Way of Politics (1989).
- Japan Society for the Promotion of Science Fellowship (1982–1983).
- Japan Foundation Long-Term Fellowship (1982–1983).
- Ford Foundation Research Grant (1975–1976).
- Thyssen Foundation Fellowship (1975–1976).
- Fulbright-Hays Fellowship (1964–1965, 1966–1967).
- National Defense Foreign Language Fellowship (1963–1964, 1965–1966).
- Woodrow Wilson Fellowship (1962–1963).
