= St. Norbert College Historic District =

Historic district in Wisconsin, United States

- U.S. National Register of Historic Places
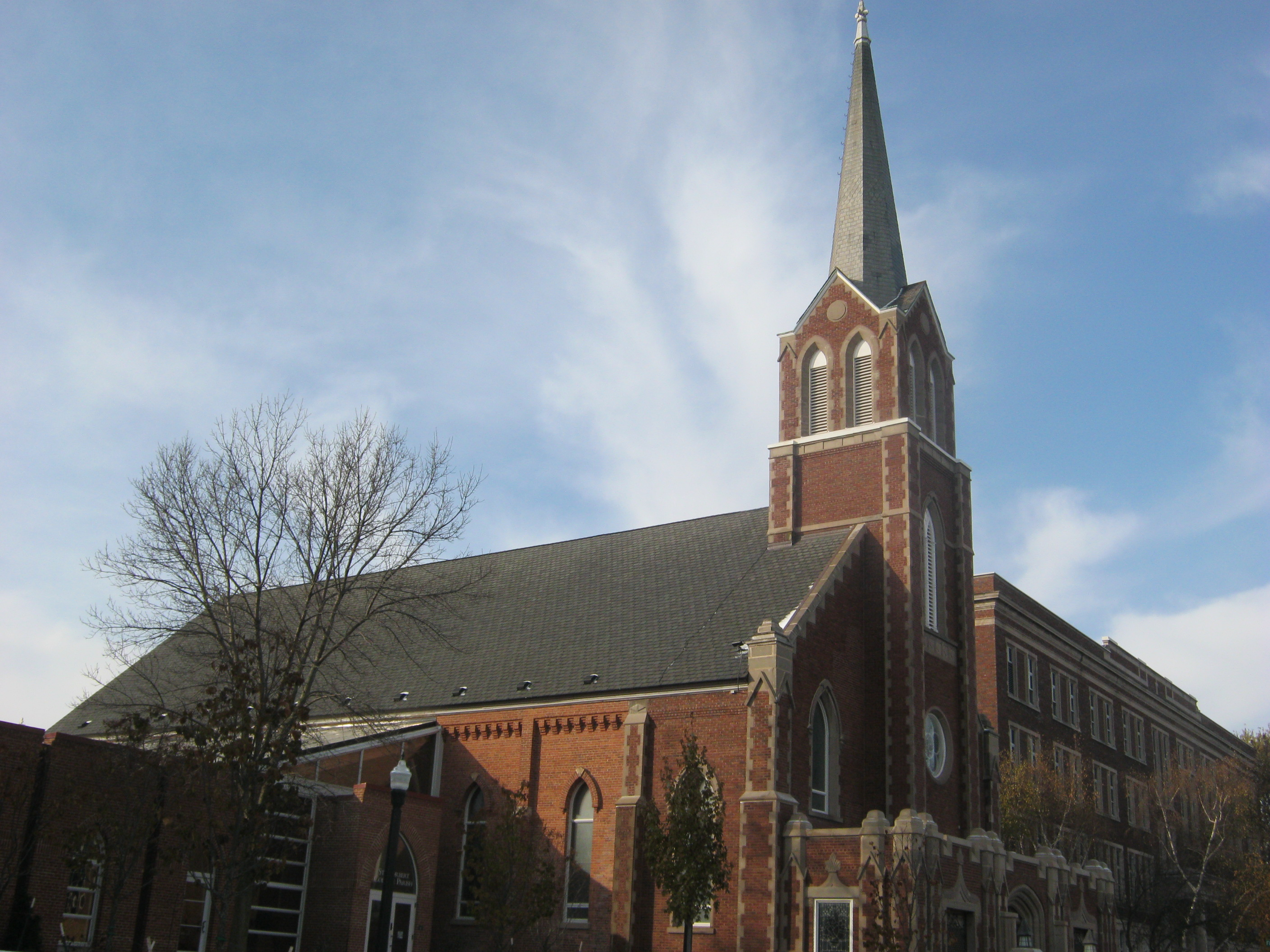
- Old St. Joseph Church, located in the district.
- Location: Bounded by Grant and Marsh Sts., Lee J. Roemer Mall and W. shore of the Fox River; De Pere, Wisconsin
- NRHP reference No.: 100001658
- Added to NRHP: April 19, 2018

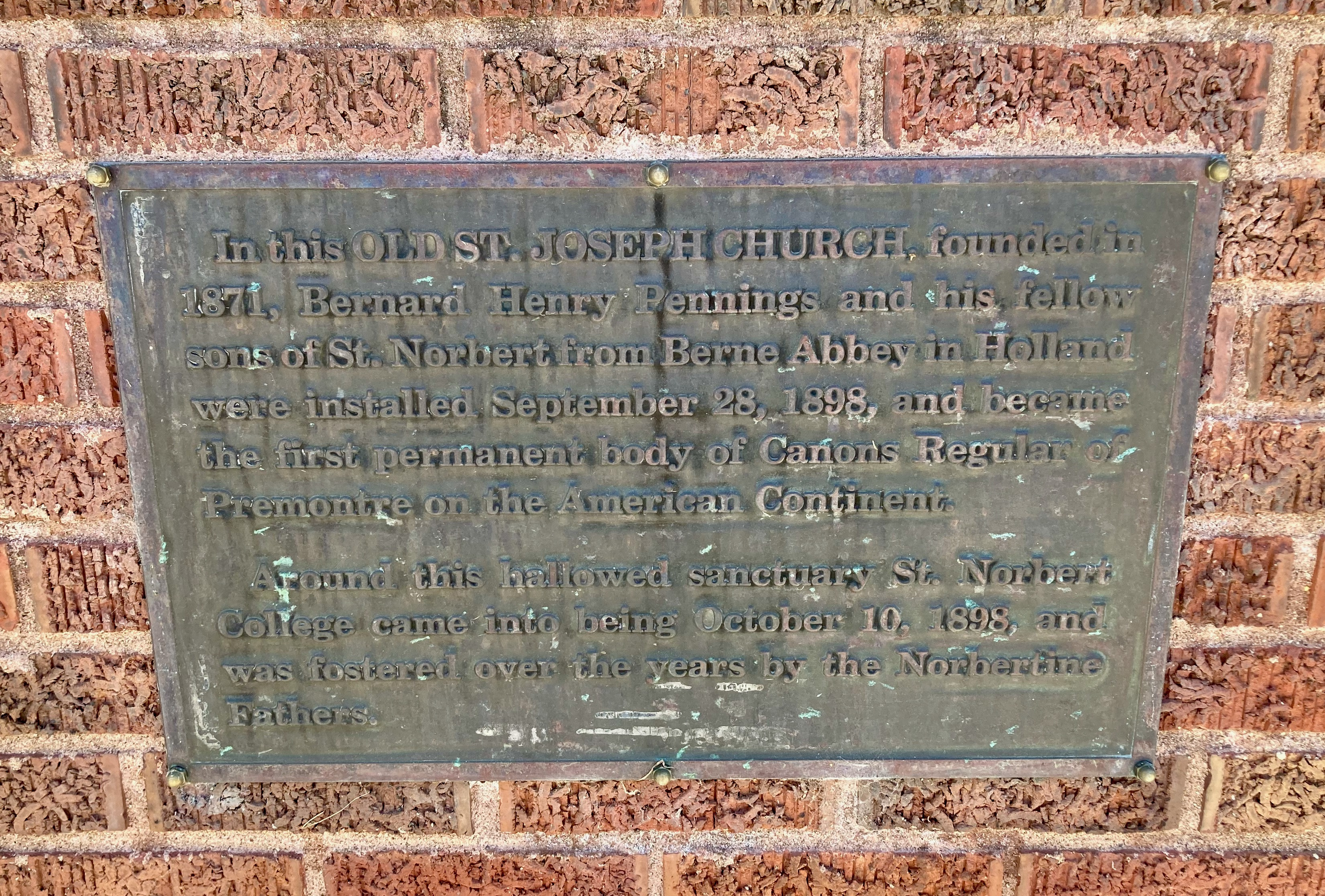
Old St. Joseph Church Plaque

The St. Norbert College Historic District is located in De Pere, Wisconsin.

== Description ==
The district is made up of historical core for the St. Norbert College campus. St. Joseph Priory, the original permanent home of Premonstratensians in North America, is located in the district.

The district includes Old St. Joseph Church, which is still an active church. It was built in 1890 and renovated in 1998. The church is located on the site of a former mission chapel that was erected for early settlers by the French-born Jesuit priest Rev. Charles Albane in 1676. The chapel stood for nearly 200 years. An all-wood structure was built in 1870, but it burned to the ground after a lightning strike in 1889. It was rebuilt in its current form as a brick structure in 1890. The church contains a statue/shrine of Saint Joseph that was crowned by Pope Leo XIII in 1891.

It was added to the State Register of Historic Places in 2017 and to the National Register of Historic Places the following year.
