= John Hanley =

John Hanley or Jack Hanley may refer to:

- John Hanley, early resident of Calhoun, Kentucky
- John C. Hanley, United States Army general
- John Hanley (runner) (born 1923), 3rd in the 3000 m steeplechase at the 1946 USA Outdoor Track and Field Championships
- John Hanley (hurdler) (born 1947), American hurdler, 1969 All-American for the Rutgers Scarlet Knights track and field team
- Jack Hanley, personality of American serial killer John Wayne Gacy
- Jack Hanley (shot putter) (born 1949), American shot putter, 1969 All-American for the Maryland Terrapins track and field team
