= Laurie Joyner =

American academic administrator

9th President of St. Norbert College
- Incumbent
- Assumed office July 12, 2023
- Preceded by: Thomas Kunkel

20th President of Saint Xavier University
- In office January 1, 2017 – July 12, 2023
- Preceded by: Christine Wiseman
- Succeeded by: Rebecca Sherrick

14th President of Wittenberg University
- In office July 1, 2012 – November 6, 2015
- Preceded by: Mark H. Erickson
- Succeeded by: Mike Frandsen

Personal details
- Children: 3
- Education: Loyola University New Orleans (BA); Tulane University (MA, PhD)

Laurie M. Joyner (born December 10, 1965) is an American sociologist and academic administrator. She is the ninth and current president of St. Norbert College, and she is the first woman to hold this role. Joyner was previously the president of Saint Xavier University in Chicago and Wittenberg University in Ohio. Joyner's academic work focused on inequality and applied social research.

== Early life and education ==
Joyner received her BA in sociology from Loyola University New Orleans in 1986. She worked in administrative positions at her alma mater. She was the recipient of the Dux Sociologicus Award. In 1992, she received an MA from Tulane University in sociology, followed in 1995 by a PhD from the same institution.

Joyner's doctoral advisor was James D. Wright, PhD, longtime editor-and-chief of Social Science Research.

== Professional life ==
Joyner served as a vice president and dean at Rollins College. She later became president of Wittenberg University. Joyner was president of Saint Xavier University from 2017 to 2023. On July 12, 2023, she became the ninth president of St. Norbert College. She is its first female president.

== Personal life ==
Joyner is married and has three sons.
