= Tadashi Yamamoto =

Japanese internationalist

Tadashi Yamamoto CBE (March 11, 1936 – April 15, 2012) was one of Japan's leading internationalists and a pioneering proponent of efforts to strengthen nongovernmental ties between Japan and the United States as well as between Japan and other countries. Yamamoto championed the view that civilian diplomacy and person-to-person exchanges conducted by nongovernmental organizations had a critical role to play in international relations. He was the founder and longtime president of the Japan Center for International Exchange (JCIE) a foreign policy think tank established in 1970 which promotes bilateral relations and exchanges between nongovernmental organizations. Yamamoto also helped to found the Shimoda Conference in 1967, a private sector forum for the discussion of bilateral issues between American and Japanese policymakers and policy experts. The Wall Street Journal has called him "an ardent champion of the U.S.-Japan alliance."

Yamamoto served as the President of the Japan Center for International Exchange (JCIE) from 1970 until his death in 2012. As head of the JCIE, Yamamoto simultaneously served as director for a number of forums, including the German-Japan Forum, the UK-Japan 21st Century Group, the Korea-Japan Forum, the Trilateral Commission Pacific Asia Group, and the Friends of the Global Fund, Japan, which works to promote the goals of The Global Fund to Fight AIDS, Tuberculosis and Malaria throughout Asia.

In addition to the Shimoda Conference and the JCIE, Yamamoto also founded the Korea-Japan Forum, the U.S.-Japan Parliamentary Exchange Program, and the Trilateral Commission.

== Biography ==
=== Early life ===
Yamamoto was born in 1936 into a Japanese Catholic family in Tokyo. His family moved to Hong Kong when he was three months old. The family then moved to Bombay, British India, where they lived for seven months. Yamamoto and his family returned to Japan in 1940. He initially studied at Rokko Senior High School before transferring to Komaba High School, from which he graduated in 1953.

He enrolled at Sophia University in 1954 with the intention of becoming a Catholic priest. However, his career path changed when he transferred from Sophia University in Japan to St. Norbert College in the U.S. state of Wisconsin in 1958. He studied in the United States from 1958 until 1962, receiving his MBA from Marquette University, a Jesuit university in Milwaukee, in 1962. He became interested in the social changes occurring in the U.S. at the time, including the civil rights movement, and the election of President John F. Kennedy, whose table he waited on during the 1960 campaign. The progressive ideals that they advocated and the values of “love and community” which he saw reflected in the Vatican II reforms of the same era became the inspiration for his later work.

He married his wife, Chiyoko Aikawa, in 1966, and they had four sons together.

=== Career ===
After graduating from Marquette in 1962 he returned to Japan where he worked at the Shin-Etsu Chemical Company as the foreign relations secretary for Tokusaburo Kosaka, the then president of Shin-Etsu who would later be elected to the House of Representatives of Japan.

Working for Kosaka, Yamamoto helped organize and found the first Shimoda Conference in Shimoda, Japan, in 1967, where United States Senate Majority Leader Mike Mansfield served as the keynote speaker. The inaugural Shimoda Conference was the first postwar meeting to convene political leaders and public intellectuals from the United States and Japan on equal footing for a foreign policy dialogue, and it came to be seen as a milestone in Japan’s reemergence on the world stage. The conference, which was held regularly until the 1990s, became a leading avenue to promote private sector dialogue between the two countries. In February 2012, Yamamoto organized a relaunch of the Shimoda Conference, which had not been held in seventeen years.

During his keynote speech at the 1967 Shimoda Conference, Mansfield made a public call for the establishment of a privately sponsored exchange between members of the US Congress and the Japanese Diet so they could build mutual understanding and speak frankly and off-the-record about common challenges. In response, Yamamoto launched the first ever US-Japan parliamentary exchange in 1968. These exchanges are credited by early participants, such as Speaker of the US House of Representatives Tom Foley, U.S. Secretary of Defense Donald Rumsfeld, and Senate Majority Leader Howard Baker, for introducing a generation of American leaders to Japan and creating the personal ties that later were important in defusing trade tensions and strengthening bilateral cooperation in a range of areas. This led Foley to remark that he knew “of no more important individual so effective in strengthening our bilateral ties.”

In 1970, after managing Tokusaburo Kosaka's successful campaign for a Diet seat, Yamamoto made the decision that he could best contribute to Japan's international relations by leaving Kosaka's employment and creating an independent, nongovernmental and nonpartisan policy institute. He founded the Japan Center for International Exchange (JCIE) in 1970 and, while growing it into one of the country’s most prominent international affairs institutes, and he remained fiercely insistent that it could only contribute to Japan and the world by maintaining complete autonomy from government influence.

As a member of the US House of Representatives, Donald Rumsfeld was among the first participant in JCIE's US-Japan Parliamentary Exchange, beginning a long professional relationship between Yamamoto and Rumsfeld. In 1975, Yamamoto organized a meeting at the White House between Rumsfeld, who was the White House Chief of Staff for President Gerald Ford, and the Vice Chairman of the now defunct Japanese Socialist Party, Saburō Eda. Yamamoto made the meeting possible, despite Socialist Party's opposition to the Treaty of Mutual Cooperation and Security between the United States and Japan. As the first meeting between the Socialists and US government officials in 23 years, the visit opened the way for a new engagement with Japan’s main opposition party.

In 1973, Yamamoto became a founding member of the Trilateral Commission, which organizes policy dialogues involving international affairs experts, political leaders, business executives, journalists, and other societal leaders in Asia with counterparts from democracies in North America and Europe. At a time when international affairs dialogues focused almost solely on Europe and the United States, the Commission was created to engage Japan, then a rising power, as a full-fledged member in international dialogue and the launch of the Commission symbolized Japan’s acceptance as an equal partner in global affairs. The Commission is still active in the 2010s.

Yamamoto worked directly with numerous Prime Ministers of Japan and their administrations during his career as well. Yamamoto became the director of the Japan-US Economic Relations Group from 1979 to 1981, the US-Japan Advisory Commission from 1983 to 1984, and the Korea-Japan 21st Century Committee from 1988 until 1991. He was appointed to both the First and Second Prime Minister’s Private Council on International Cultural Exchange; the first Council from 1988 to 1989 and again during the Second Council from 1993 until 1994. Former Prime Minister Keizō Obuchi appointed Yamamoto as the executive director of the Prime Minister’s Commission on Japan’s Goals in the 21st Century from 1999 to 2000. In February 2010, Prime Minister Yukio Hatoyama named Yamamoto to a policy panel on defense issues.

Yamamoto's interests broadened from the United States during his career, which spanned 50 years. He promoted improved relations with Europe, South Korea, China, and Southeast Asia through the nongovernmental exchanges and Track 2 policy dialogues. He played an important role in efforts to strengthen regional cooperation among Asian countries. Also, after the end of the Cold War, he quietly became one of Japan’s key proponents of the concept of human security, a more comprehensive approach to ensuring the security of individuals and not just national borders. As informal advisor to Prime Minister Keizo Obuchi and other leaders, his influence paved the way for Japan’s adoption of the approach as a main tenet of the country’s foreign policy.

While promoting policy dialogues and political leadership exchanges, Yamamoto also championed efforts to develop Japan's nonprofit sector and to encourage the growth of philanthropy in Asia. As a result, JCIE played an important role in efforts by Keidanren and other business organizations to increase corporate philanthropy in Japan.

During his later years, Yamamoto worked to strengthen Japan's contributions to global health and the fight against HIV/AIDS and other major communicable diseases in Africa and other parts of the developing world. He established the Friends of the Global Fund, Japan, inside of JCIE, which advocates a greater Japanese support for the Global Fund and deeper government, business, and grassroots engagement in the campaign against disease in poorer countries. By bringing Japanese politicians to Africa to speak with people battling AIDS and arranging for overseas celebrities such as Bono to raise awareness of the need for Japan to do more to help poor countries, the initiative played a key role in encouraging the Japanese government to triple its annual contribution to the Global Fund from 2005 to 2012, making it one of the world’s most generous supporters of the battle against the global AIDS epidemic.

Yamamoto received awards and commendations from the governments of Australia, Germany, Japan and the United Kingdom. He became the recipient of the US-Japan Foundation Distinguished Service Award in 2008. On July 5, 2011, he was awarded the Order of the Rising Sun, Gold Rays with Neck Ribbon by the Emperor of Japan.

In April 2012, Yamamoto reportedly told the former Secretary-General of the Liberal Democratic Party, Koichi Kato, that, "I want to promote exchanges between Japanese and U.S. politicians, but I cannot because Japanese politics has wasted away. I am embarrassed."

=== Death ===
Tadashi Yamamoto died from gallbladder cancer at a hospital in Tokyo on April 15, 2012, at the age of 76. His funeral was held at St. Ignatius Catholic Church in Tokyo on April 18. Columbia University professor Gerald Curtis, who knew Yamamoto for more than forty years, noted that he never abandoned his beliefs that exchanges between democracies should be spearheaded by the private sector. The former director of the editorial board at Asahi Shimbun, Yukio Matsuyama, also stated that, "Yamamoto did more for international exchange than anyone else did, both in name and reality, having had nothing to start with ... He was liked by everyone [he came into contact with].

== Works authored ==
- Emerging Civil Society in the Asia Pacific Community (1995)
- The Nonprofit Sector in Japan (1998)
- Corporate-NGO Partnership in Asia Pacific (1999)
- Deciding the Public Good: Governance and Civil Society in Japan (1999)
- Governance and Civil Society in a Global Age (2001)
- Philanthropy and Reconciliation: Rebuilding Postwar US-Japan Relations (2006)

== Honours ==
- Germany: Order of Merit of the Federal Republic of Germany (1990)
- UK: Commander of the Most Excellent Order of the British Empire (1993)
- Australia: the Order of Australia (2003)
- Japan: the Order of the Rising Sun, Third Class (2011)
