= Kodansha Encyclopedia of Japan =

English-language encyclopedia

The Kodansha Encyclopedia of Japan is a comprehensive English-language encyclopedia first published in 1983 that covers a broad range of topics on Japan.

== History ==
First published by Kodansha in 1983 followed by a supplemental volume in 1986. A two-volume updated edition, and a one-volume abridged (and updated) edition were published in 1993. The latter was the basis of the online version, which as of June 2010, is no longer available as a free-standing site. It can still be accessed through the JapanKnowledge database.

== Content ==
The encyclopedia was created by both Japanese (680) and non-Japanese scholars (524) from 27 nations. Some of the advisors to the Kodansha Encyclopedia of Japan included Edwin O. Reischauer, Gerald L. Curtis, Ronald P. Dore, John W. Hall, Ezra Vogel, Akira Iriye, and Tsuru Shigeto. Japanese scholars produced 40 percent of the text, while foreign scholars wrote the remaining 60 percent. Japanese and American scholars wrote the majority of the articles. Many articles are English translations from Japanese encyclopedias.

There are more than 11,000 entries covering 37 categories of information. These include encyclopedia standards such as history, literature, art, religion, economy, and geography. In addition, science, technology, law, women, folklore, plant and animal life, food, clothing, sports, and leisure are given separate categories. It also contains roughly 1000 illustrations in the form of photographs, maps, diagrams, graphs, charts and tables. The ninth index volume contains names and words mentioned within the encyclopedia, but not assigned separate entries.

To accommodate a wide audience, from students to businessmen and diplomats, articles were written with the dual purpose of introducing topics at a level appropriate for a high-school student and provide a good starting point for more advanced students with some knowledge of Japan.

Numerous articles are no more than a paragraph. However, more general headings such as "History of Japan" have as many as 70,000 words. Many are signed, especially the longer ones. A lot of articles are followed by suggestions for further readings in English, Japanese, and occasionally other languages. Japanese names are given in Japanese order (family names first).

== See also ==
- Japanese encyclopedias

== General references ==
- Johnston, William M. (1998). Recent Reference Books in Religion: A Guide for Students, Scholars, Researchers, Buyers & Readers. London: Taylor & Francis. ISBN 978-1-57958-035-3.
