= Ryōunshū =

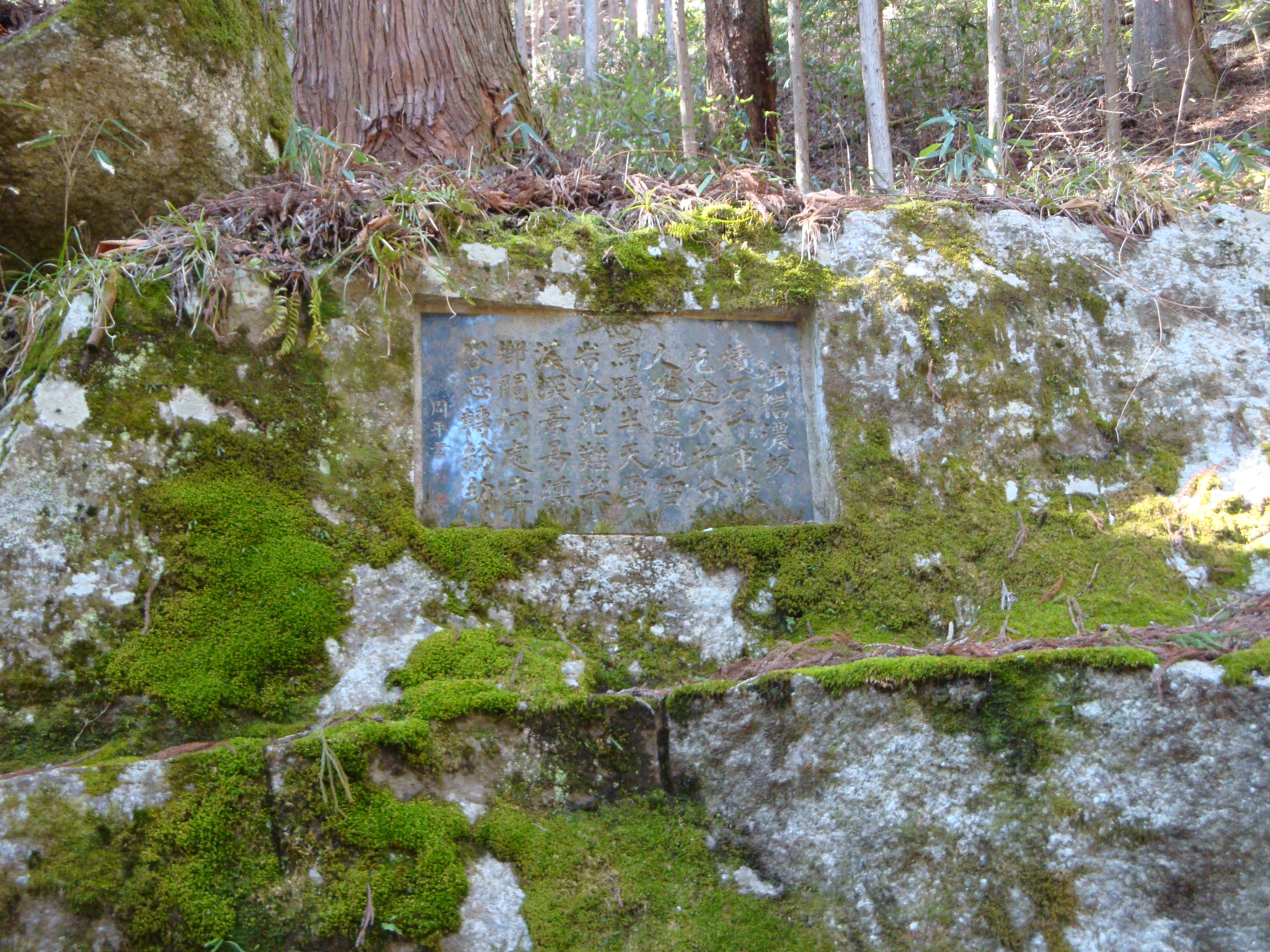
Wataru Shinanozaka Poetry Monument Ryounshu Sakagami Imatsugu's Shinanozaka Chinese Poetry

The Ryōunshū (凌雲集) was the first imperially commissioned Japanese kanshi collection. It was compiled by Ono no Minemori, Sugawara no Kiyotomo and others under the command of Emperor Saga. The text was completed in 814.

== Title ==
The title, Ryōunshū, is an allusion to poetry so great that it soars higher than the clouds. The preface also gives the title as Ryōun Shinshū (凌雲新集), describing it as a "new collection".

== Contents ==
The text begins with a preface outlining the background for and editorial principles surrounding the subject matter. The main text contains 91 poems contributed by 24 authors composed in kanshi style. The poems were ordered by author.
