= Kristi Ross =

American entrepreneur

Kristi Ross is an entrepreneur based in Chicago. She is co-CEO and President of tastytrade, Inc., a financial media company and parent company to tastyworks, an online brokerage firm; Quiet Foundation, Inc., a registered investment advisory firm; the Small Exchange, Inc., a futures exchange awaiting CFTC approval; and dough, LLC, a new fee free online brokerage firm launching sometime in 2019.

== Career ==
Kristi Ross began her career as a CPA and was the chief financial officer of Automated Trading Desk Specialists, a stock specialist on the Chicago Stock Exchange.

Ross was the chief financial officer at thinkorswim Group, a private trading experience company, which sold to TD Ameritrade for $750 million in 2009. As CFO, she led numerous merges, acquisitions and integration.

She is co-founder of dough, Inc., a visual front-end trading technology platform, which was launched in 2014. It was combined with and rebranded to tastyworks in January 2017. Ross currently co-hosts the show 'Bootstrapping in America,' where she interviews entrepreneurs.

She holds active memberships at various technology and trading companies such as ChicagoNext Fintech Council of World Business Chicago, P33 Technology Initiative co-chair Capital and Finance Committee, board member of CEC/1871, Economic Club of Chicago, and The Chicago Network.

Ross started the non-profit, EveryHandCounts, that provided fun educational children's books and stories that taught children how to get involved with philanthropy at a young age.

She has received various awards and recognition such as the Illinois Technology Association CityLights' Prominent Tech Woman, the Moxie Awards' Woman in Tech, Entrepreneur of the Year by Ernst and Young, James Haugh Award, Innovative Finance Global Women in Fintech Powerlist, Crain's Chicago's Tech 50, TechWeek 100 list, Chicago Business Journal's Women of Influence list, and Midwest Women in Tech Award.

== Personal life ==
Kristi Ross grew up in Wisconsin. Ross trained to become a CPA at St. Norbert College.

She lives in Chicago with her three daughters.
