= Japanese encyclopedias =

In Japanese, encyclopedias are known as hyakka jiten (百科事典), which literally means "book of a hundred subjects," and can trace their origins to the early Heian period, in the ninth century. Encyclopedic works were published in Japan for well over a thousand years before Japan's first modern encyclopedias were published after Japan's opening to the West, during the Meiji Period (1868–1912). Several encyclopedias have been published in Japan since World War II, including several children's encyclopedias, and two major titles are currently available: the Encyclopedia Nipponica, published by Shogakukan, and the Sekai Dai-Hyakka Jiten, compiled by the Heibonsha publishing company. A Japanese Wikipedia is also available.

== History ==
The antecedents of the modern Japanese encyclopedia date from the ancient period and the Middle Ages. Encyclopedic books were imported from China from an early date, but the first proto-encyclopedia produced in Japan was the 1000-scroll Hifuryaku (秘府略), compiled in 831 upon the emperor's orders by Shigeno no Sadanushi (滋野貞主) and others, only fragments of which survive today. The first truly Japanese-style encyclopedia is said to be Minamoto no Shitagō's 10-scroll work, Wamyō Ruijushō, which was written in the ancient Japanese syllabary system of man'yōgana and contained entries arranged by category. During the 13th century, an 11-scroll book appeared on the origins of things, Chiribukuro (塵袋) (literally, “rubbish bag”), and its innovative question-and-answer format was much imitated throughout the medieval period.

In the 17th century, the Sancai Tuhui (三才図会; Sansai Zue in Japanese) (literally, "illustrated book of the 'Three Powers,' i.e., heaven, earth, and man"), a 14-part, 106-scroll illustrated encyclopedia published in Ming China in 1609, entered Japan. In 1712, emulating the Sancai Tuhui, Terajima Ryōan published the Wakan Sansai Zue (和漢三才図会) ("illustrated book of the three powers in Japan and China"), the first Japanese illustrated encyclopedia. Written in classical Chinese (the language of scholarship throughout East Asia at the time), the book reflected the outlook of its day with such fantastical entries as "The Country of the Immortals" (不死国, fushi koku) and "The Land of the Long-Legged People" (長脚国, naga-ashi koku). Its logical presentation, topical divisions, and discussion of alternative explanations for the same phenomena, however, anticipated the modern encyclopedia.

During Japan's Civilization and Enlightenment Movement (文明開化, bunmei kaika) at the time of the Meiji Period, the westernizer Nishi Amane (西周) compiled Japan's first modern encyclopedia, the Hyakugaku renkan (百学連環). Beginning in 1873, the Ministry of Education sponsored the translation of Chambers' Information for the People into Japanese under the name Hyakka Zensho (百科全書, the "Comprehensive Encyclopedia"), which was completed in the 1880s. Later, the Ministry of Temples and Shrines sponsored the compilation by Nishimura Shigeki (西村茂樹) and others of another encyclopedic work, the Koji ruien (古事類苑), which was finally completed in 1914. The publishing house Sanseido published its 10-volume encyclopedia, the Nihon Hyakka Daijiten (日本百科大辞典, the "Great Japan Encyclopedia"), between 1908 and 1919, and Heibonsha published a 28-volume work, the Dai-Hyakka Jiten (大百科事典, the "Great Encyclopedia"), between 1931 and 1934. The Dai-Hyakka Jiten was the first publication to use the characters 事典 (jiten) rather than 辞典 (jiten) to represent the word "encyclopedia," starting the convention whereby 事典 is used to mean "encyclopedia" and 辞典 is used to mean "dictionary."

After World War II, Heibonsha responded to Japan's new internationalization by publishing the Sekai Dai-Hyakka Jiten (世界大百科事典, the "Great World Encyclopedia") in 32 volumes, between 1955 and 1959. Shogakukan then published the 19-volume Encyclopedia Japonica, Japan's first full-color reference work, between 1967 and 1972. Between 1970 and 1974, Gakushu Kenkyusha published a 21-volume encyclopedia, the Gurando Gendai Hyakka Jiten (グランド現代百科事典, the "Great Modern Encyclopedia"). In 1974 and 1975, a 30-volume Japanese version of the Encyclopædia Britannica, the Buritanica Kokusai Hyakka Jiten (ブリタニカ国際百科事典, the "Britannica International Encyclopedia"), was also published in Japan. In 1984, Heibonsha returned with a 16-volume compilation, the Dai-Hyakka Jiten (大百科事典, the "Great Encyclopedia"), and Shogakukan began publishing a 25-volume encyclopedia, the Nihon Dai-Hyakka Zensho (日本大百科全書, literally, the "Japan Comprehensive Encyclopedia," but officially known by the English title, Encyclopedia Nipponica) the same year, finishing in 1989. A second edition was published in 1994. Various children's encyclopedias were also published in the 1950s and 1960s.

== Major currently available Japanese print encyclopedias ==
=== Encyclopedia Nipponica ===
Encyclopedia Nipponica (日本大百科全書, Nihon Dai–Hyakka Zensho; literally the "Japan Comprehensive Encyclopedia") was an encyclopedia published by Shogakukan in Japan. It is published in five formats: traditional book form, CD-ROM, e-book, Internet, and as an i-Mode service. Both the Internet and i-Mode versions require payment to use.

=== Sekai Dai-Hyakka Jiten ===
The Sekai Dai–Hyakka Jiten (世界大百科事典, literally the “World Comprehensive Encyclopedia”) is an encyclopedia compiled by the Japanese publisher Heibonsha. It is published in three formats: traditional book form, CD-ROM, and Internet. The online version is known as the Network Encyclopedia (ネットで百科, Netto-de Hyakka).

Heibonsha has also compiled a smaller encyclopedia called the Mypedia (マイペディア, Maipedia), published in five formats: a single-volume book form, CD-ROM, electronic dictionary, memory card for PDAs, and Internet.

== Subject-specific encyclopedias ==
=== Nihon Rekishi Chimei Taikei ===
The "Encyclopedia of Japanese Historical Place Names" (日本歴史地名大系, Nihon Rekishi Chimei Taikei) is a fifty-volume encyclopedia published by Heibonsha between 1979 and 2005. It is similar in scope to the "Kadokawa Dictionary of Japanese Place Names" (角川日本地名大辞典, Kadokawa Nihon Chimei Daijiten), published in forty-nine volumes by Kadokawa Shoten between 1978 and 1990.

== Digital and online encyclopedias ==
The advent of personal computers and the Internet has brought encyclopedias into the digital age. In addition to the Japanese version of Wikipedia, the Encyclopædia Britannica and Microsoft's Encarta both appear on CD-ROM in Japanese versions.

== Other Japan related encyclopedias ==
Though not technically a Japanese encyclopedia because it is not written in Japanese, the Kodansha Encyclopedia of Japan is an English-language encyclopedia on Japan, first published by Kodansha in 1983, supplemented in 1986, and revised in 1993. An online version of this encyclopedia also exists at www.ency-Japan.com.
