= Wisconsin Association of Independent Colleges and Universities =

Coordinates: 43°4′25.094″N 89°23′11.183″W

The Wisconsin Association of Independent Colleges and Universities (WAICU) is the official organization of Wisconsin's private, nonprofit (or independent) institutions of higher learning and their more than 56,000 students. It is headquartered in Madison, Wisconsin, was founded in 1961 and is recognized under state law. In 2023, the Association has 23 members. Each WAICU member is a nonprofit, fully accredited, four-year baccalaureate and/or graduate institution. The presidents of these institutions lead WAICU as its board of directors.

== Programs and services ==
- Policies: WAICU advocates for public policies that support the member institutions
- Accessibility: WAICU implements outreach initiatives that advance the affordability and accessibility of private, nonprofit colleges and universities in Wisconsin.
- Collaboration: WAICU organizes cost-saving collaborations such as joint purchases, insurance programs, and service offers.
- Involvement: Over 30 groups meet under the WAICU umbrella. The groups provide advice to the presidents (the Board) and to WAICU staff on programs and policies, share best practices, vet new opportunities, and provide personal and professional support to peers.
- Scholarships/Internships: WAICU seeks private philanthropic support for scholarships and internships for students and currently administers scholarships funded through WAICU endowments or through gifts. At 2021 the average annual sticker price for a student with the financial aid was $4,415.
- Workforce initiatives: WAICU works with career directors at member institutions to create and promote career, internship, and graduate school opportunities for students that meet their professional and educational goals.
- Research: WAICU is the state coordinator for the federal Integrated Postsecondary Education Data System or IPEDS (for private, nonprofit colleges) and operates the WAICU Longitudinal Data System.

== Members ==
WAICU members include:

- Alverno College
- Bellin College
- Beloit College
- Carroll University
- Carthage College
- Concordia University Wisconsin
- Edgewood University
- Herzing University
- Lakeland University
- Lawrence University
- Marian University
- Marquette University
- Medical College of Wisconsin
- Milwaukee Institute of Art and Design
- Milwaukee School of Engineering
- Mount Mary University
- Nashotah House
- Ripon College
- St. Norbert College
- Viterbo University
- Wisconsin Lutheran College
