= Lawrence J. Fleming =

United States Air Force general

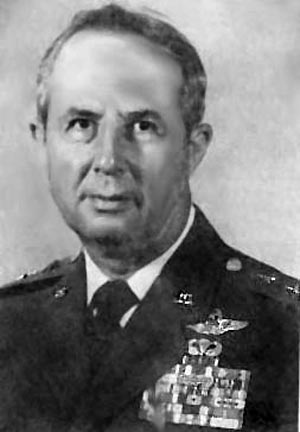
- Born: December 12, 1922; Green Bay, Wisconsin
- Died: September 2, 2006 (aged 83)
- Military career
- Allegiance: United States of America
- Branch: United States Air Force
- Service years: 1942–1975
- Rank: Major general

Lawrence J. Fleming (December 12, 1922 – September 2, 2006) was a major general in the United States Air Force.

== Early life ==
Fleming was born in Green Bay, Wisconsin, in 1922. He attended St. Norbert College.

== Military career ==
Fleming originally enlisted in the United States Army Air Corps in 1942. He was commissioned an officer in 1944. During World War II, he served with the 55th Fighter Group, where he piloted a North American P-51 Mustang. Following the war he was assigned to the 1st Fighter Group before being transferred to the 94th Fighter-Interceptor Squadron. Later he served as an exchange officer with the Royal Air Force of the United Kingdom, during which time he piloted a Gloster Meteor. In 1955 he was assigned to the 327th Fighter-Interceptor Squadron. Fleming was later assigned to the Military Assistance Advisory Group. While serving with the MAAG he completed parachutist training with the Belgian Army. He was later assigned to the 29th Air Division before being given the command of the 13th Fighter-Interceptor Squadron and the 343d Composite Group.

During the Vietnam War, he piloted a Douglas A-1 Skyraider. He served as commander of Tyndall Air Force Base from 1971 to 1973. Later in his career he became Chief of Staff of the United States Southern Command in the Panama Canal Zone. His retirement was effective as of September 1, 1975.

== Awards ==
Fleming received include the Legion of Merit with two oak leaf clusters, the Distinguished Flying Cross, the Meritorious Service Medal, the Air Medal with silver oak leaf cluster and bronze oak leaf cluster, the Air Force Commendation Medal with oak leaf cluster, the Distinguished Unit Citation, and the Outstanding Unit Award with oak leaf cluster.

== Death and legacy ==
Fleming died on September 2, 2006.
