= John C. Hanley =

United States Army general

John C. Hanley is a brigadier general in the United States Army Reserve.

== Career ==
Hanley was originally commissioned an officer in the United States Army and was assigned to the 101st Airborne Division (Air Assault). While with a second assignment with the 101st Airborne Division (Air Assault), he was deployed to serve in the Gulf War.

He also served in Germany as a member of the 56th Field Artillery Brigade and the 41st Field Artillery Brigade. After returning to the United States from Operation Desert Storm, he was named an assistant professor of military science at Georgetown University.

After transferring to the Army Reserve, Hanley's first assignment was with the 84th Division (Training). From 1996 to 1999, he served as a battalion commander in Milwaukee, Wisconsin. After serving various other roles with the 84th Division (Institutional Training), he was assigned to the 85th Division (Training Support) at Ft. Sheridan as a group commander, then as the chief of staff, 88th Regional Readiness Command, Ft. Snelling, Minnesota.

In 2008, Hanley was promoted to brigadier general and was assigned to Fort McCoy in Monroe County, Wisconsin, then returned to Fort Sheridan, Illinois, as a brigade commander with the 75th Training Division (Mission Command). Upon completion of this assignment, he was assigned as program manager, Office of the Program Manager-Facilities Security Forces in Saudi Arabia.

Awards he has received include the Legion of Merit with one oak leaf clusters, the Bronze Star Medal, the Meritorious Service Medal with three oak leaf clusters and the Army Commendation Medal with silver oak leaf cluster. In addition, Hanley is authorized to wear the Parachutist Badge and the Air Assault Badge.

== Education ==
- St. Norbert College
- Troy State University
