= Thomas Kunkel =

Thomas Kunkel (born September 24, 1955) is an author, journalist, educator and past president of St. Norbert College in De Pere, Wisconsin.

== Career ==
Kunkel earned his B.A. in political science at the University of Evansville in 1977 and his master's degree in humanities from there in 1979. He spent much of his early career in the newspaper industry, working in editorial and managerial roles for newspapers, including the San Jose Mercury News, the Miami Herald, The New York Times, and The Cincinnati Post.

From 1997 to 2000 he served as editor and director of the Project on the State of the American Newspaper. From 2000 to 2008, Kunkel was dean of the Philip Merrill College of Journalism and president of the American Journalism Review at the University of Maryland.

In 2008, Kunkel became the seventh president of St. Norbert College. He retired from the college in 2017. Kunkel was named CEO of the Year by unanimous vote in the 2015 Council for Advancement and Support of Education District V Chief Executive Leadership Award program. The association represents 383 Midwestern colleges and universities.

Kunkel has authored or edited seven books. His most recent, Man on Fire: The Life and Spirit of Norbert of Xanten, published in 2019 by St. Norbert College Press in association with the Center for Norbertine Studies, was named 2020 Best Book by a Small Publisher in the Catholic Book Awards. His 2015 book, Man in Profile: Joseph Mitchell of The New Yorker, won the prestigious Sperber Prize from Fordham University for the best media biography of the year.

== St. Norbert College ==
In his inaugural speech, Kunkel spoke of maintaining the core values of the Catholic, liberal arts college: reflection, service to others, and a sense of community.

In his nine-year tenure, he oversaw new developments at the college, including the introduction of the Master of Business Administration and Master of Arts in Liberal Studies graduate programs; the launch of the Donald J. Schneider School of Business & Economics; a partnership with the Medical College of Wisconsin; the implementation of a new core curriculum; and the establishment of a biennial academic conference titled “Sport and Society in America” that is co-sponsored by the Green Bay Packers.

He raised more than $150 million, resulting in the construction of a new science facility, enhancement of existing campus facilities, an increase in the school's endowment, additional support to faculty and student programs, and increased financial aid for students.

During Kunkel's tenure, the college constructed and renovated facilities, including the Gehl-Mulva Science Center, Michels Commons, Schneider Stadium, the Mulva Library, Gries Hall, the Ariens Family Welcome Center, Todd Wehr Hall and the Cassandra Voss Center.

Kunkel retired in the summer of 2017. He subsequently completed a biography of the college's founding saint, Norbert of Xanten (1075–1134). Man on Fire: The Life & Spirit of Norbert of Xanten was published in 2019.

== Works ==
- Genius in Disguise: Harold Ross of The New Yorker (1995)
- Enormous Prayers: A Journey Into the Priesthood (1998)
- Letters From the Editor (Editor, 2000)
- Leaving Readers Behind: The Age of Corporate Newspapering (Editor, with Gene Roberts and Charles Layton, 2001)
- Breach of Trust: A Crisis of Coverage in the Age of Corporate Newspapering (Editor, with Gene Roberts, 2002)
- Man in Profile: Joseph Mitchell of The New Yorker (2015)
- Man on Fire: The Life and Spirit of Norbert of Xanten (2019)
