= Japan Center for International Exchange =

Organization based in Tokyo, Japan

- Abbreviation: JCIE
- Formation: 1970
- Founder: Tadashi Yamamoto
- Type: Foreign policy think tank
- Location: Tokyo
- Website: jcie.org

Japan Center for International Exchange (JCIE) is an "independent, nonprofit, and nonpartisan organization dedicated to strengthening Japan's role in international networks of dialogue and cooperation." Founded in 1970 by Tadashi Yamamoto, their stated goals are:

- promoting Japan's engagement in the international community;
- encouraging thoughtful and collaborative analysis of critical issues in international affairs;
- strengthening civil society and enhancing its domestic and global contributions; and
- establishing, strengthening, and expanding networks of dialogue and cooperation.

The three major program they have created to accomplish these goals include: the Political Exchange Program, the Global ThinkNet policy research and dialogue programs, and the CivilNet program to strengthen civil society and philanthropy. Many of their programs are coordinated with their U.S. affiliate JCIE/USA and other international organizations.

They also host the Shimoda Conferences. While hosting dialogues on policies, the JCIE does not hold policy related positions themselves. Policy Innovations describes the JCIE as "one of the few truly independent think tanks" in Japan's international affairs. At the last Shimoda Conference Japan's Minister of Foreign Affairs commented that since their founding the Japan Center for International Exchange "has played an enormous role in enhancing mutual understanding and exchange between Japan and other countries."

The Japan Center for International Exchange alongside the Japan Society have been leading fundraising efforts in Japan in response to the 2011 Tōhoku earthquake and tsunami. The fund operated by the JCIE is called the Japan NGO Earthquake Relief and Recovery Fund. Their website alongside save-the-children.org and japansociety.org/earthquake was reported to be one of the three most recommended websites to donate to from organizers of the relief efforts.
