= Encyclopedia Nipponica =

Encyclopedia of Japan by Shogakukan

The Encyclopedia Nipponica (日本大百科全書, Nihon Dai Hyakka Zensho; lit. The Japan Comprehensive Encyclopedia) is a discontinued series of encyclopedia of Japan and the Japanese people, first published by Shogakukan from 1984 to 1989 in 25 volumes. After 10 years of preparation, over 130,000 entries and 500,000 indexes were organized in alphabetical order in more than 23,000 pages. The most recent version, 1994, has 26 volumes, including the separate volumes of indexes and an auxiliary. The encyclopedia is currently out of print.

== Shogakukan and Heibonsha ==
When it was founded in 1922, Shogakukan specialized in study books and magazines for elementary school students. According to its websites, Nihon hyakka daijiten (日本百科大事典) published in 1962 was the first encyclopedia from Shogakukan. Since then, Shogakukan has continuously published encyclopedias: Sekai genshoku hyakka jiten (世界原色百科事典) in 1965, Dainihon hyakka jiten japonica (大日本百科事典ジャポニカ) in 1967, Kodomo hyakka jiten (こども百科事典) in 1970, and Banyu hyakka daijiten (万有百科大事典) in 1972 among others. Shogakukan's Encyclopedia Nipponica has been one of the major Japanese encyclopedias. The other major encyclopedia, World Encyclopedia (世界大百科事典), was published from Heibonsha. Since the foundation in 1914, Heibonsha has put emphasis on encyclopedias. Currently, World Encyclopedia holds three editions: World Encyclopedia, World Encyclopedia on DVD, and the online edition called Netto de hyakka.

== Topics ==
Over 6,000 authorities contributed articles to the Encyclopedia Nipponica. The topics ranges from social sciences, sciences, humanities, leisure, and lifestyle, emphasizing the Japanese social climate and culture. It focuses on local regions and their histories, holding 3,325 entries on Japanese place names. At the same time, it explains foreign countries, their culture, history, and society, focusing especially on their relationships with Japan.

The length of the articles varies. Some are only a paragraph, while the others are over two pages. The articles are signed. Over 50,000 images enable the users to enjoy the encyclopedia and to understand the explanation. In particular, sciences and arts articles contain graphs, charts, maps, earth satellite maps, chronological tables, pictures of the arts, and portraits.

== Special features ==
In addition to each entry, the encyclopedia contains "collaborations" where several authorities from different academic fields combine their various academic viewpoints.

The verb entries are the other feature of Encyclopedia Nipponica, which cannot be seen in conventional encyclopedias. They not only explain the simple meaning of verbs but also describe them culturally, socially, and scientifically. For instance, the entry of “walk” explains the ways and the reason for both people and animals to walk and the results of medical experiments on walking.

== Formats ==
In addition to the paper-based encyclopedia, a CD-ROM version of Encyclopedia Nipponica and DVD version were once available. Entries from the CD-ROM and DVD version totaled 380,000. They also included approximately 80 video clips, 8,000 images, 90 animations, 350 music clips, and 60 virtual reality images. However, all three versions of Encyclopedia Nipponica are out of print as of November 2005. The National Diet Library in Tokyo, Japan, holds the first and second version of Encyclopedia Nipponica.

== See also ==
- Japanese encyclopedias
