= National Shrine of Saint Joseph (De Pere, Wisconsin) =

Shrine in De Pere, Wisconsin, USA

Coordinates: 44.4453429°N 88.0708525°W

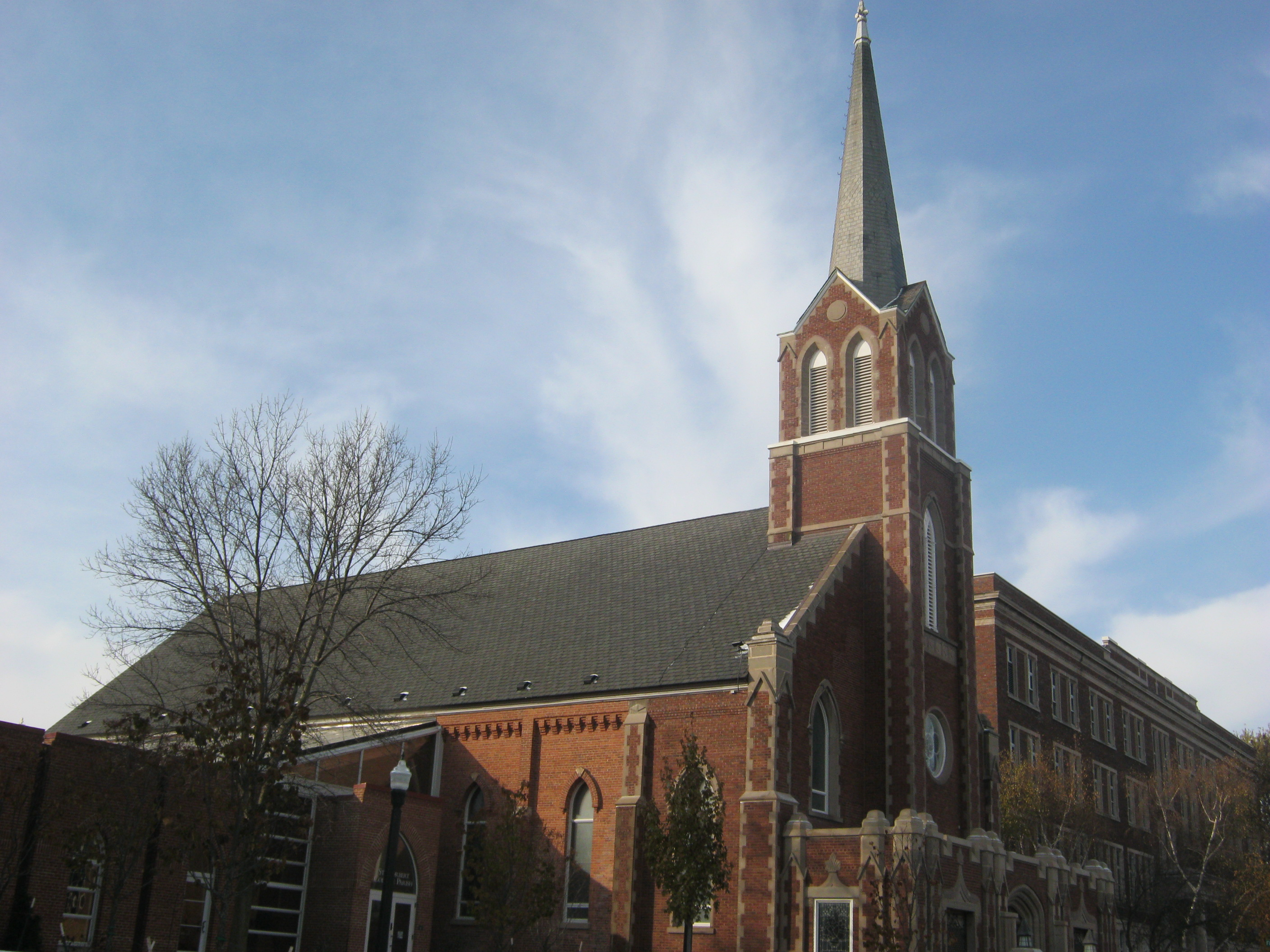
The National Shrine of St. Joseph (De Pere, WI, USA) exterior.

The National Shrine of St. Joseph is located in De Pere, Wisconsin, a few miles from the city of Green Bay, in the Roman Catholic Diocese of Green Bay. The Shrine is located at 123 Grant Street, De Pere, Wisconsin, on the St. Norbert College campus.

== Description ==
The National Shrine of St. Joseph, De Pere, Wisconsin, was established in 1888 by Fr. Joseph Durin, a Missionary of the Sacred Heart, pastor of then St. Joseph Parish (De Pere). It was first described as a Shrine in 1890, and termed a National Shrine in 1892 from correspondence with Pope Leo XIII.

The Norbertine (Premonstratensian) Community of St. Norbert Abbey assumed the ministry of the Shrine in 1898, the same year as the establishment of St. Norbert Priory (now St. Norbert Abbey) and St. Norbert College on the grounds of which the Shrine is located.

The Shrine's Statue of St. Joseph was solemnly crowned by the Most Rev. Sebastian Messmer, 4th Bishop of Green Bay, in 1892. Though the Shrine was temporarily relocated to the new St. Norbert Abbey between 1969 and 2015, it has since returned to its original location.

Since 1888, a weekly Perpetual Novena in honor of St. Joseph has been prayed every Wednesday at the Shrine as well as an annual Solemn Novena leading to the Solemnity of St. Joseph (March 19) from March 10 to 19.
