= Heibonsha =

Japanese publishing company

Heibonsha Ltd.
- Heibonsha company logo
- Founded: 1914
- Founder: Shimonaka Yasaburō
- Country of origin: Japan
- Headquarters location: Tokyo
- Publication types: Books
- Official website: www.heibonsha.co.jp

Heibonsha (平凡社) is a Japanese publishing company based in Tokyo, which publishes encyclopedias, dictionaries and books in the fields of science and philosophy. Since 1945 it has also published books on art and literature. Similarly to the Iwanami Shoten and the Chikuma Shobō publishing houses, its publishing program is directed primarily at an academic audience and features well-illustrated publications.

Heibonsha's head office is at 3-29 Kanda-jinbocho, Chiyoda-ku, Tokyo 101-0051.

== History ==
In 1914 the educator Shimonaka Yasaburō (下中彌三郎) (1878–1961) founded the Heibonsha publishing house as a means of selling copies of his pocket encyclopedia That is Convenient: Pocket Advisor (や此は便利だ! : ポケツト顧問, Ya kore wa benri da: Poketto komon) to the general public. In 1923 it was converted into a public limited company. In 1924, in the wake of the 1923 Great Kantō earthquake, it began to publish books on a larger scale. In 1927, it began publishing the 60-volume Collection of Contemporary Popular Literature (現代大衆文学全集, Gendai taishū bungaku senshū) as a series of budget small format books, which have been dubbed a series of "one-yen books" (一円本). Beginning in 1928 there followed the publication of its Encyclopedia (大百科事典, Daihyakka jiten) in 28 volumes, the final volume of which appeared in 1934.

In the years 1934–36 Heibonsha published the Daijiten (大辭典, Great/Comprehensive Dictionary), edited by Shimonaka Yasaburō. This work remains the largest kokugo dictionary ever published. The original 26-volume edition, which is still available in condensed versions, entered over 700,000 headwords, listed by pronunciation, and covered a wide variety of Japanese vocabulary.

The publishing house ceased operations in the 1940s, but at the end of the Second World War in 1945 it relaunched with a reprinting of the 1934 Encyclopedia. Over the following decade new works followed, including the Social Encyclopedia (社会科事典, Shakaika jinten), Housekeeping (家庭科事典, Kateika jitan), Complete Collection of World Art (世界美術全集, Sekai bijutsu zenshū), Encyclopedia of World History (世界歴史事典, Sekai rekishi jiten), and the Children's Encyclopedia (児童百科事典, Kodomo hyakkaten). In 1954–59, in order to commemorate the 40th anniversary of the publishing house, a 32-volume comprehensive World Encyclopedia (世界大百科事典, Sekai hyakka jiten) was issued.

In 1961, as part of an encyclopedia boom, the company's National Encyclopedia (国民百科事典, Kokumin hyakka jiten) appeared. In 1963, Heibonsha launched Japan's first monthly graphics magazine, Sun (太陽, Taiyō). "The Eastern Library Series" (東洋文庫, Tōyō Bunko) book series was issued featuring a comprehensive range of literature from the Far East.

1971 saw the launch of another book series under the title of Heibonsha Selected Books (平凡社選書, Heibonsha sensho), which was followed in 1972 by the first edition of Special Editions Taiyō (別冊 太陽, Bessho Teiyō). In the early 1970s Weatherhill, a U.S.-based publisher, and Heibonsha jointly published The Heibonsha Survey of Japanese Art, a book series with text in both Japanese and English. In 1979 the 50-volume gazetteer Japanese Historical Place Names (日本歴史地名大系, Nihon rekishi chimei taikei) series began to be published, and as of 2022 it is also available online with "200,000 headings with detailed explanations of [each] place name".

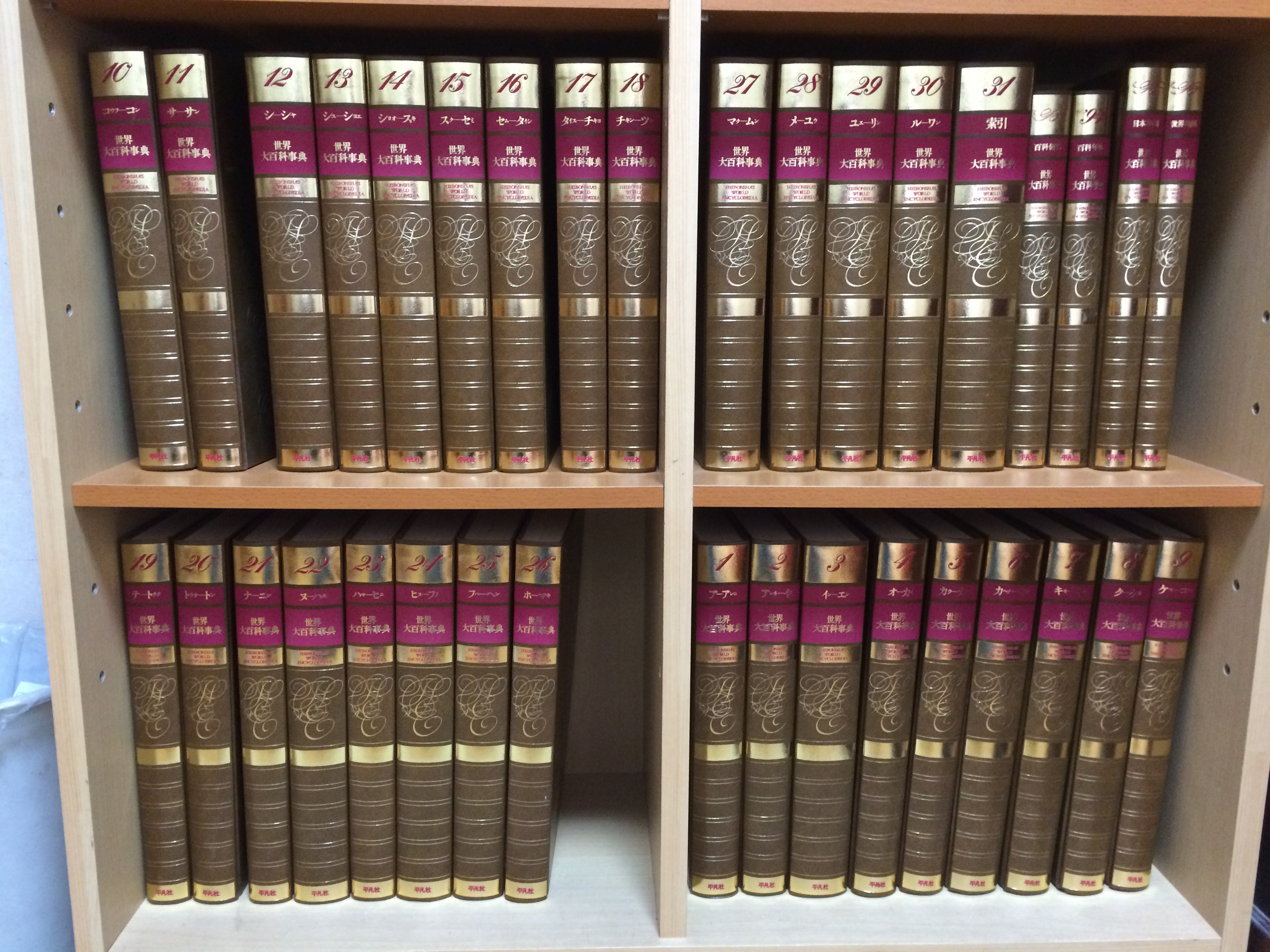
Heibonsha's World Encyclopedia (1988)

In 1980 the Japanese Map Research Institute (日本地図研究所, Nihon chizu kenkyūjo), an internal division of Heibonsha, was spun off as the Heibonsha Map Publishing (平凡社地図出版, Heibonsha chizu shuppan) imprint. In 1984, Heibonsha published a 16-volume Encyclopedia (大百科事典), and in 1987 the publication of the seven-volume World Great Museum Picture Book (世界大博物図鑑, Sekai dai-hakubutsu zukan) began. In 1988 the publication of all 35 volumes of the World Encyclopedia (世界大百科事典, Sekai daihayakka jiten) was completed. 1993 saw the launch of the "Heibonsha Library" (平凡社ライブラリー, Heibonsha raiburarī) book series, and in 1994 the "Corona Books" (コロナ・ブックス, Korona bukkusu) book series began issuing volumes.

In 2011 a new magazine Heart (こころ, Kokoro) began publication. In 2012 the company moved its offices across Tokyo to Kanda-Jimbochō. In 2014 the 100th anniversary of the publishing house was celebrated.

== See also ==
- Heibonsha World Encyclopedia
- Japanese dictionary
- Japanese encyclopedias
