= Heibonsha World Encyclopedia =

Japanese encyclopedia published by Heibonsha

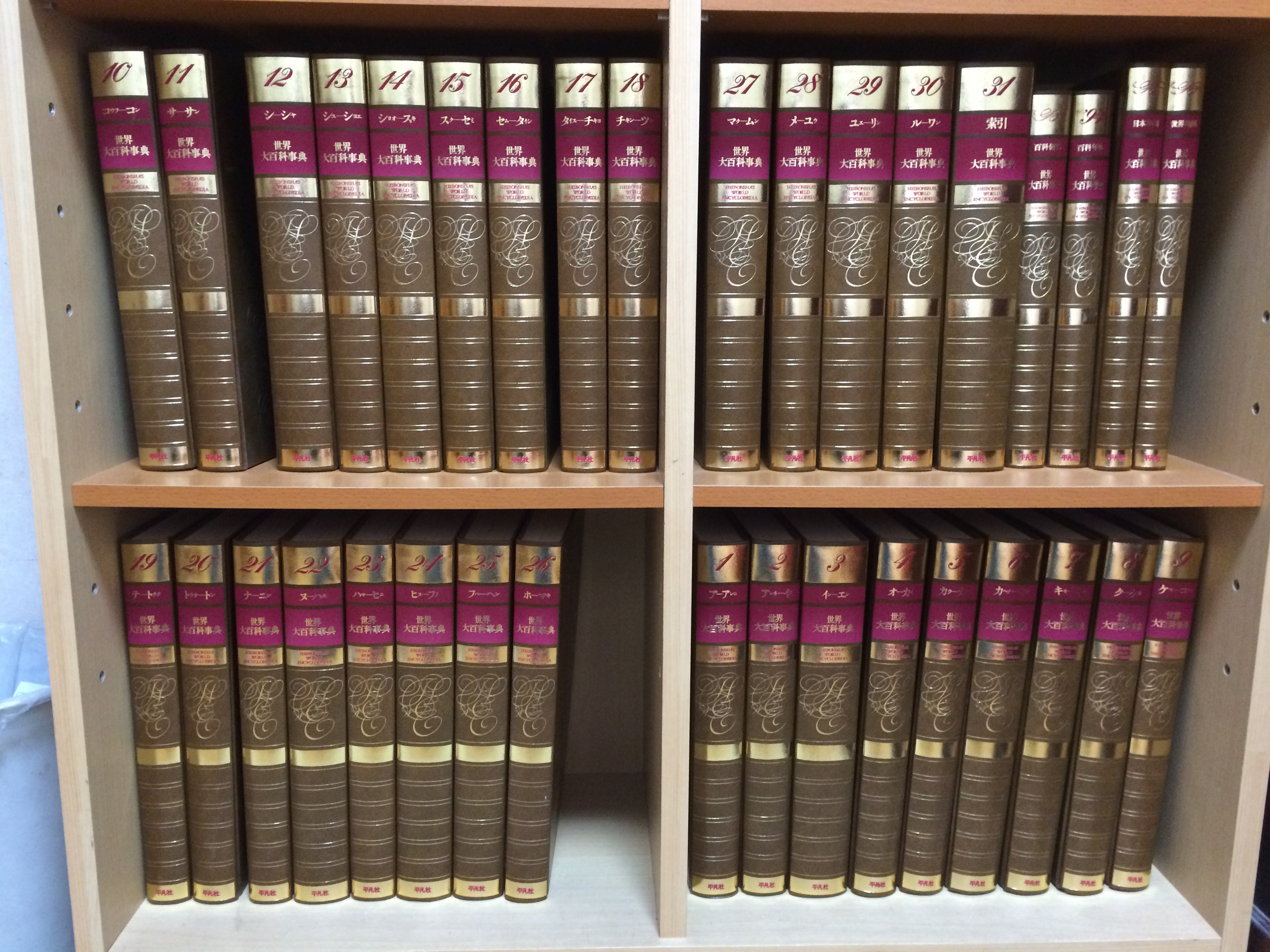

The Heibonsha World Encyclopedia (世界大百科事典, Sekai Dai-hyakka Jiten) is one of Japan's two major encyclopedias, the other being the Encyclopedia Nipponica. The World Encyclopedia is widely held to be the most complete and up-to-date encyclopedia in the Japanese language.

== Formats ==
The Heibonsha World Encyclopedia currently exists in three slightly different editions:

- the World Encyclopedia, originally published in 1988 by Heibonsha, Tokyo, and based on the Heibonsha Encyclopedia (Heibonsha Dai-hyakka Jiten) published in 1984–1985
- the World Encyclopedia on DVD
- the Internet-only Netto de Hyakka (ネットで百科), which was started in 1999

The 1984–1985 Heibonsha Encyclopedia was published in sixteen volumes, while the 1988 World Encyclopedia had thirty-five volumes. The content changed very little between these two editions, but the latter version was published on heavier paper and included several additional indexes and supplementary volumes.

The Heibonsha Encyclopedia is no longer being published in a print edition, and is instead being produced in the above-mentioned DVD and Internet formats. A reduced version of this encyclopedia is also available in numerous Japanese electronic dictionaries, and modified access to Netto de Hyakka is available using Japanese cell phones. The content differs only slightly between the various formats. Netto de Hyakka is constantly updated and therefore provides the most current information, but the majority of articles have not been significantly altered from the text edition. The Internet format is text-only and does not include the images that are present in the text and DVD version.

The current version of Netto de hyakka (ネットで百科@Home) is called the Network Encyclopedia in English, and is provided by Hitachi Systems and Services. Heibonsha no longer provides support for electronic versions of the World Encyclopedia.

== Characteristics ==
All articles in the Heibonsha Encyclopedia are signed by their authors. The encyclopedia does not include a list of reference works used in each article. Articles differ widely in length based on the significance of the topic. The encyclopedia covers a wide variety of topics of both general and specific interest, with particular attention to topics relating to Japan. The 1988 edition features 90,000 entries and includes an index that lists cross-references for approximately 400,000 terms. Beginning with the 1988 edition, the encyclopedia has included an index in Western character sets for more convenient searching of foreign words.

== See also ==
- Japanese encyclopedias
