= Shimoda Conference =

Shimoda Conference (previously Japanese-American Assembly) was a series of unofficial dialogues between representatives of the United States and Japan that first began in 1967 and continued every 2–4 years until 1994. In 2011, representatives from the United States and Japan gathered to hold the New Shimoda Conference in order to revive these dialogues.

== History ==
The first conference took place in 1967 and was the first forum for serious, but unofficial discussion between the two nations since World War II. Hosted by the Japan Council for International Understanding (JCIE's predecessor) and the American Assembly of Columbia University the conference was attended by several Congressional members, including then Senate Majority Leader Mike Mansfield, Senator Edmund Muskie (later secretary of state), Representative Tom Foley (later Speaker of the House), and Representative Donald Rumsfeld (later secretary of defense), as well as Japanese diet members Yasuhiro Nakasone (later prime minister) and Eiichi Nagasue (later chairman of the Democratic Socialist Party).

== New Shimoda Conference ==
On February 22, 2011 about 50 representatives from the United States and Japan gathered at the Tokyo hotel for the New Shimoda Conference in order to revive the historic forum between the two nations. The conference commemorates the 40th anniversary of the Japan Center for International Exchange(JCIE), the independent organization that hosts the event.

Attendees

- Jim Webb, Member, US Senate; Chairman, US Senate Foreign Relations Subcommittee on East Asian and Pacific Affairs; Chairman, Senate Armed Services Subcommittee on Personnel
- Diana DeGette, Member, US House of Representatives
- Motohisa Furukawa, Member, House of Representatives of Japan; former Deputy Chief Cabinet Secretary
- Tadashi Yamamoto, President, Japan Center for International Exchange
- Hitoshi Tanaka, Senior Fellow, Japan Center for International Exchange; Chairman, Institute for International Strategy; former Deputy Minister for Foreign Affairs of Japan
- Ichiro Fujisaki, Ambassador of Japan to the United States
- Seiji Maehara, Foreign Minister of Japan
- ...

== Conferences ==
- First Shimoda Conference (1967)
- Second Shimoda Conference (1969)
- Third Shimoda Conference (1972)
- Fourth Shimoda Conference (1977)
- Fifth Shimoda Conference (1981)
- Sixth Shimoda Conference (1983)
- Seventh Shimoda Conference (1987)
- Eighth Shimoda Conference (1990)
- Ninth Shimoda Conference (1994)
- New Shimoda Conference (2011)

== Publications ==
In addition to analysis and coverage of the forum, most of the discussions at the Shimoda Conferences are available in bilingual copies.

- Discord in the Pacific: Challenges to the Japanese-American Alliance, 1972 (3rd Shimoda Conference)
- The United States and Japan, 1975
- Encounter at Shimoda: Search for a New Pacific Partnership, 1979 (Fourth Shimoda Conference)
- The Fifth Shimoda Conference, 1981
- Shimoda Report: A Continuing Dialogue on Critical Issues in U.S.-Japan Relations, 1982
- Report of the 6th Shimoda Conference, 1983
- Report of the 7th Shimoda Conference, 1987
- Report of the 8th Shimoda Conference, 1990
- Japan and the United States in Asia Pacific: The Challenges for Japan in Asia (Final Report of the Shimoda '94), 1995
- Japan and the United States in Asia Pacific: The Challenges for Japan in Asia (Background Papers for the Shimoda '94), 1995
