= Techweek =

Techweek may refer to:

- Techweek (conference), a Chicago-based conference and expo for start-up companies
- TechWeek (magazine), a bi-weekly technology magazine
- Tech week or technical week, the week before the opening night of a play
