= Technical rehearsal =

Rehearsal in film and stage

The technical rehearsal or tech rehearsal is a rehearsal that focuses on the technological aspects of the performance, in theatrical, musical, and filmed entertainment. It involves integrating lighting, sound, set changes, special effects, and other technical elements with the performance. Technical rehearsals generally happen after performers have learned their lines, blocking, and choreography. This lets the production staff, including directors, stage managers, lighting designers, sound engineers, and backstage crew, identify and fix potential issues. The forms of technical rehearsals range from a dry tech (without performers) to a wet tech (performers participate fully in costumes). Technical rehearsals are important for ensuring the safety of the performers, maintaining timing, and giving a professional experience for the audience during the main show.

== Types ==
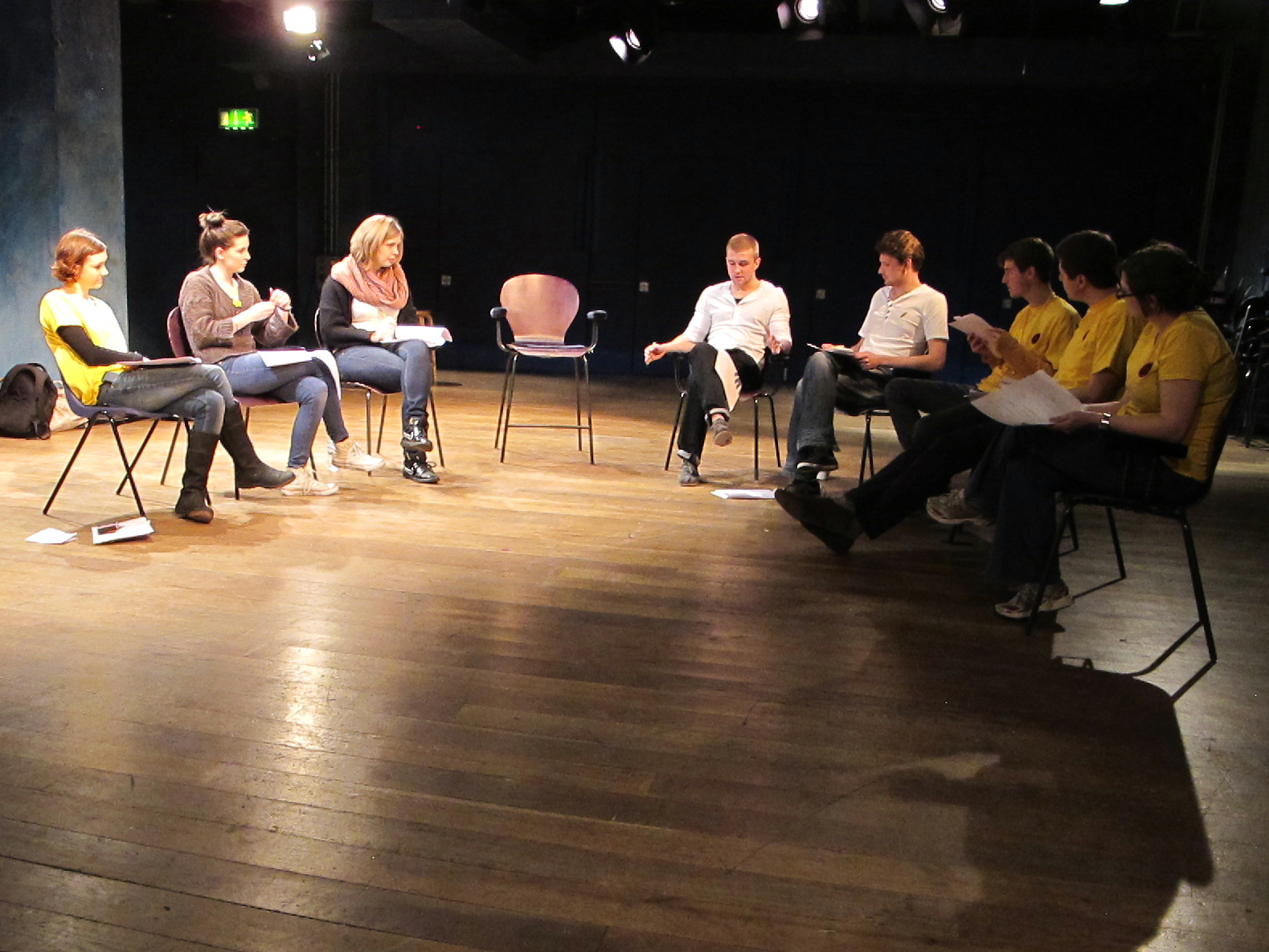
Rehearsals for actors in a theatre

Tech rehearsals are generally broken down into several types, including dry tech rehearsals, tech rehearsals, pick-up tech rehearsals, paper tech, and wet tech. Each of these rehearsals focuses on specific aspects of production. Their purpose is to fully test all of the technology being used in the performance (lighting, sound, automation, special effects (e.g. pyrotechnics), etc.) and to help the crew identify and correct mistakes. This allows various design departments(such as lighting, sound, and set design etc.) to see how their work interacts with the stage and make any adjustments if needed. For example, they allow the designers to see how their designs will impact each other (i.e. how the color of a light might affect the look of a costume), and to make final changes. Tech rehearsals make sure that all technical elements run smoothly, enhancing the safety and professionalism of the final production.

=== Dry tech ===
The dry tech is essentially a rehearsal without performers. It focuses solely on the technical elements of the production. It is a period, usually lasting multiple hours, where each designer and department head runs his or her segment of the production and goes through their specific responsibilities. It is also a chance for the technical crew such as lighting operators, sound technicians, and stagehands who will operate the equipment to become familiar with the flow of the performance. This rehearsal usually involves systematically cueing lights, where the team can identify and fix issues related to brightness, color, angle, framing, and positioning.

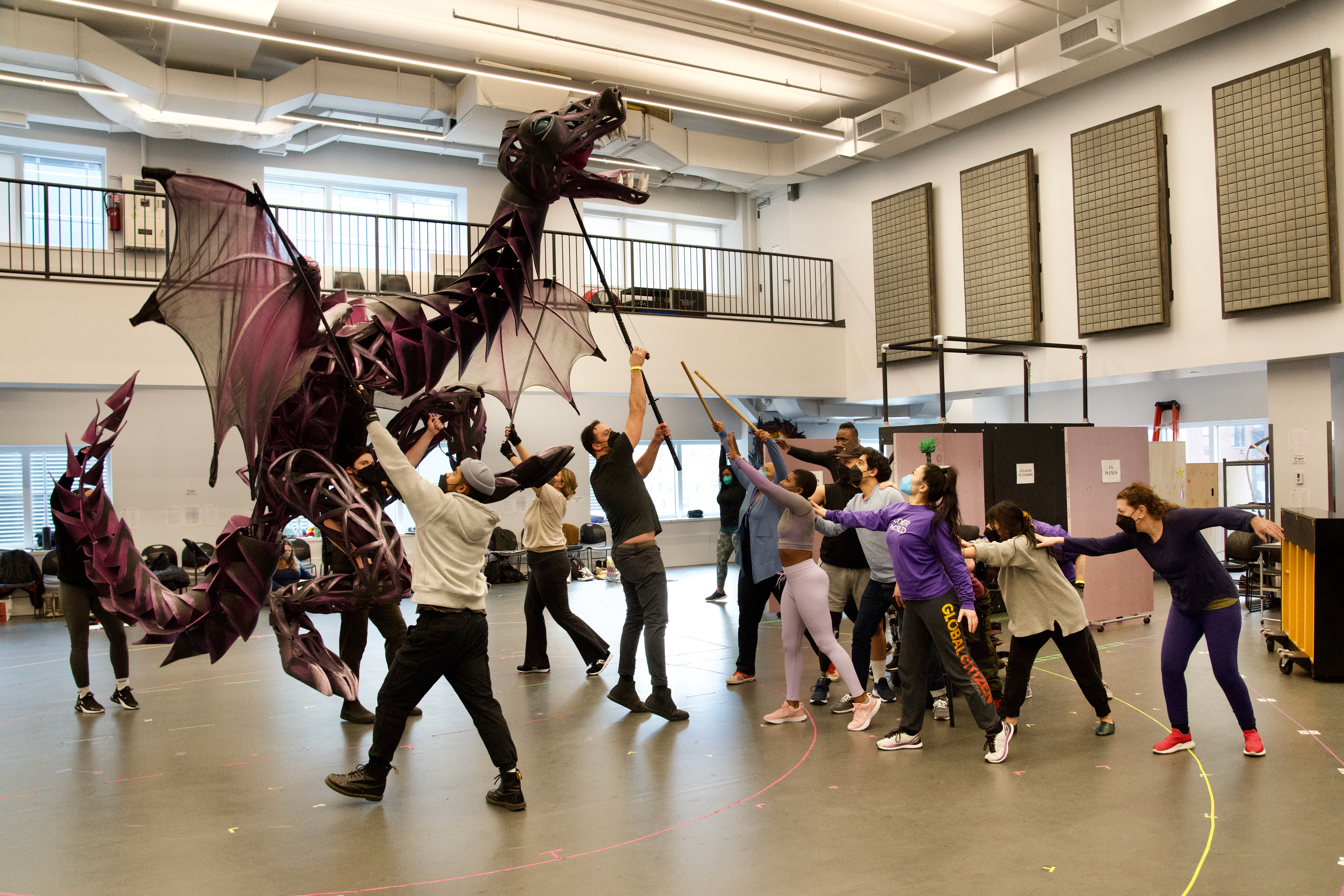
Dry tech rehearsals with props

Dry tech rehearsals also include sound checks. This allows the crew to test the levels for music, sound effects, and microphone inputs that will be used during the performances. The main goal is to check and correct any issues related to volume, pitch, timing, or feedback, to make sure the best sound quality is produced.

Lastly, for stage shows, the fly rigs or battens are tested for weight and accuracy of cueing with sound and lights. If there are moving set pieces, the crew will test their operation and mechanics (if they are automated) and practice their movement, flow, and position on and offstage.

There may be an extra step for particularly effect-intensive productions, such as film, TV, or Broadway-style stage shows, where the crew tests any special effects that require systems such as rain, fire, or explosions. When these effects are completed to the director's and production designer's satisfaction, the crew is ready to move onto the tech rehearsal.

Once these elements are successfully reviewed and meet the director's and production designer's approval, the crew moves on to the next stage. This is where technical elements are integrated with the performers during a full tech rehearsal.

=== Tech ===
The tech rehearsal includes the performers as well as production staff or crew members. It is a rehearsal that focuses on the technological aspects of the performance in theatrical, musical, and filmed entertainment. It runs through the entire production, either in its entirety or cue-to-cue. A cue (theatrical) -to-cue is when the sound and lights are run with certain parts of scenes within the production. Usually, a scene will start with the first few lines and then skip to the lines and staged blocking for the next lighting, sound, or other cues. Tech rehearsals have been known to run long hours, mainly due to multiple runs of the show within the tech.

Often included in the tech are the final show props. These props differ from rehearsal props because they are not just placeholders but the props to be used in the actual production. This is so that a performer can become acquainted with using the true prop before the actual performance so as not to look awkward when using it. It is also to test the durability of the final prop, as well as how the props will look under the final stage lighting.

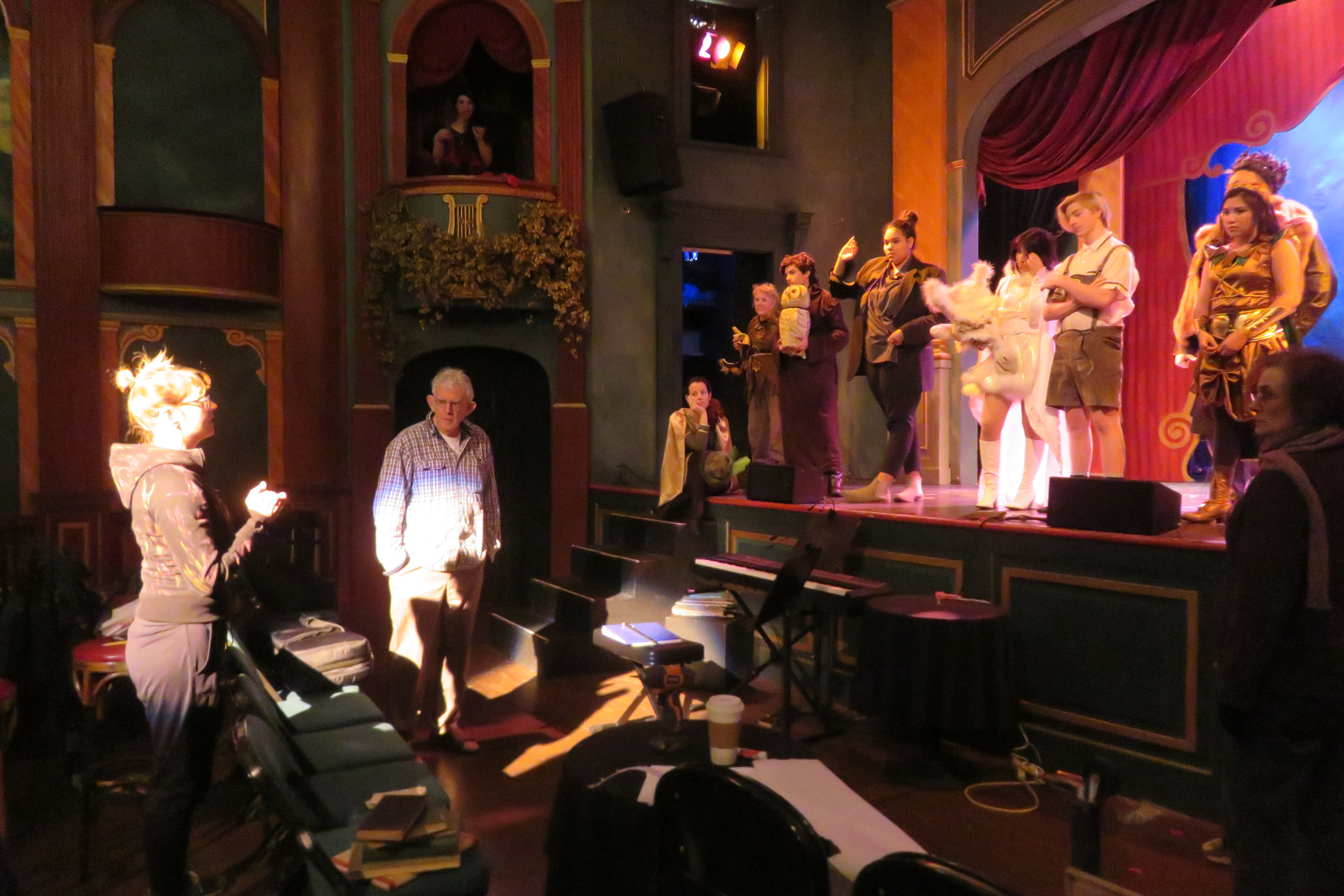
Snow White - Dress Rehearsal Scenes from December 22 to 30, 2017 at the Throckmorton Theatre in Mill Valley.

Costumes are usually reserved for use starting with the dress rehearsal, but they are sometimes brought in to test the costumes against the final stage lighting as well, so as not to produce a conflict in color differentiation in the final product. Also, costume pieces that restrict movement or fit strangely such as shoes, hats, gloves and so on may be added either in their final form or (usually) in rehearsal form approximating size, shape, etc., to allow actors to get used to them in advance. Sometimes actors will get dressed in costume for the first time and come on stage so the production staff can see the costumes in their finished form for the first time under stage lighting, called a costume parade. Costumes may also be used earlier in the week for promotional photos or videos, especially at the community theatre level.

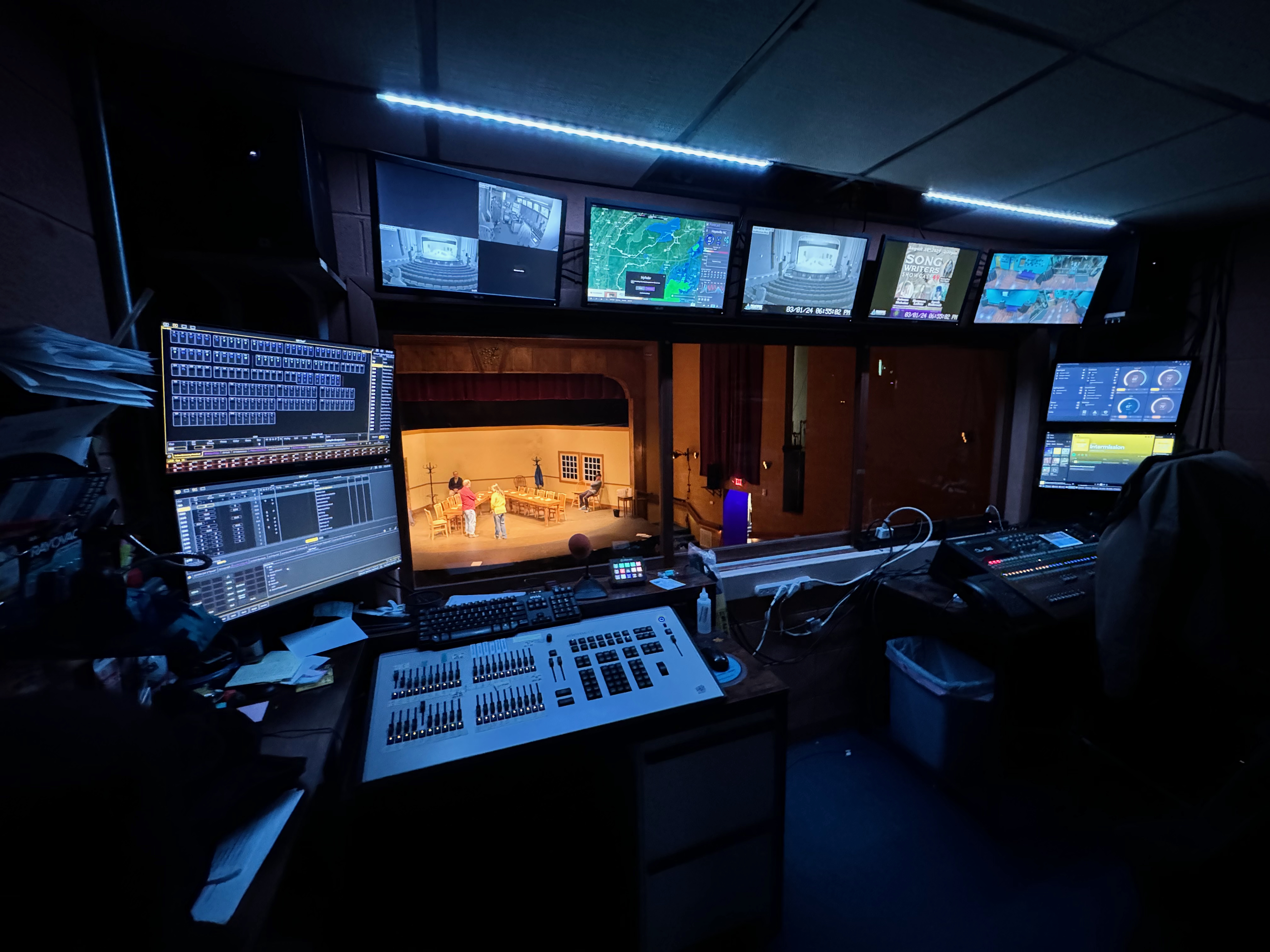
A modern control booth or tech booth for lighting and sound technicians in a theatre

During the tech, not all of the previous actions taken during the dry tech are repeated, so as to check lighting in concordance with the stage blocking and stage placement (for example, finding whether the performer is in the light hotspot or not, or how the followspot operates), check the levels on the performers' microphones (if used) and how well the performers can project if orating concurrently with sound or music, allow the performers to know when there are incoming flying rigs, allow performers to experience and become accustomed to the special effects that will occur so that it will not interfere with the actual performance and generally make sure the director and designers are happy with all aspects of the production that can be seen or heard. One very significant effect that is added in tech is blood. This allows actors to get used to it and the costume designer to see how the blood will affect the costumes.

Once completed as many times as the director feels comfortable, the tech will end. Any number of actions can usually be taken after a tech such as the running of problematic scenes or acts, another dry tech to work out problematic technical issues, or certain performers may be held to work with certain effects for which the other performers are not needed. After all this is completed, the tech rehearsal is officially over. The next rehearsal(s) to be performed is the dress rehearsal, followed by final dress rehearsal just prior to opening night.

=== Pick-up tech ===
Pick-ups usually consist of covering problem areas from previous shows, rehearsing difficult effects or transitions, or rehearsing newly introduced technical aspects. These rehearsals are often done to specifically practice complex transitions and new technical elements. Typically, these rehearsals are shorter than regular tech rehearsals. Usually lasting no longer than a few hours, they will sometimes be held on different days or times as performance pick-ups so as not to bog down the performers or to detract from the performing rehearsal aspect of the show.

These rehearsals maintain and enhance the technical quality of productions. Directors, stage managers, lighting designers, and sound engineers use pick-up tech rehearsals to adjust timing, correct lighting angles, improve sound balance, and address any technical issues from previous shows.

If the show is on tour, additional tech rehearsals may be held to cover issues that might arise from being in a different size/shape performance space. Issues might include: set size, timing, lighting angles and intensity, offstage storage, etc. Due to the fast-paced nature of tours, often there is very little or no time for additional tech rehearsals. They play a crucial role in ensuring a smooth and polished performance before the next performance.

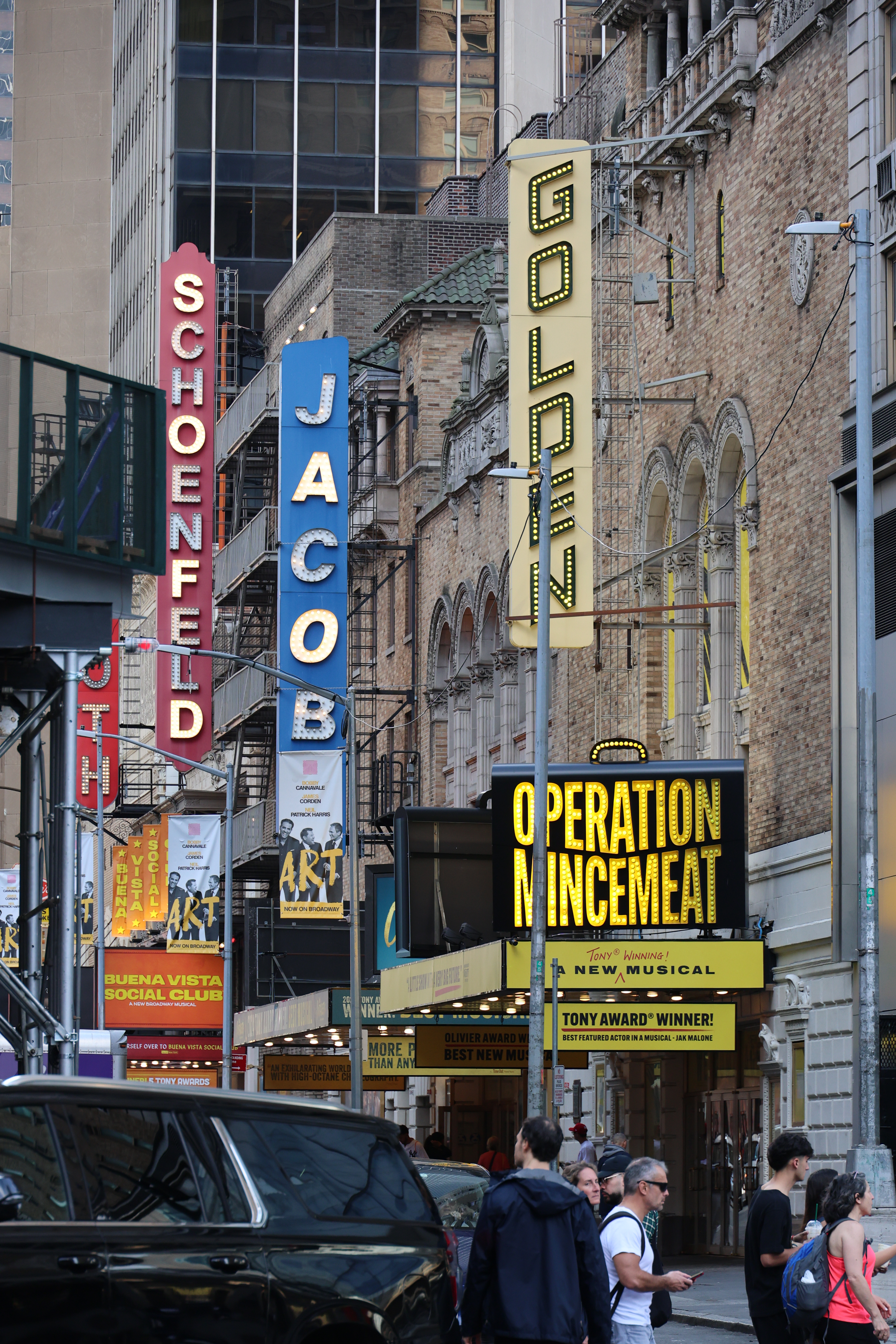
Broadway theaters on West 45th Street (George Abbott Way) in New York City.

=== Paper tech, wet tech ===
A paper tech is a rehearsal without sets or actors. It is used to allow the technical and design team to discuss aspects of the show. During a paper tech rehearsal, stage managers, lighting designers, sound engineers, and other technical crew members come together to review and organize technical elements. Stage managers lead this rehearsal session and make sure everything is written correctly, all cues are in order, and the crew is prepared for the show. This allows the crew to fully understand their responsibilities for the show. A paper tech helps the crew prepare cue scripts that allow the smooth execution of the production.

Wet Tech is a full technical rehearsal with actors and all technical elements. This rehearsal typically happens after a paper tech and includes actors in full costume, scenery, props, lighting, and sound in their complete form. Basically it is a show before the show in all its form and glory. It allows the production team to test all of the elements with live performances, so that they can solve technical challenges as they happen in real time. It also helps the actors become more comfortable with the final technical elements such as the stage transitions, scene changes and the various sound and light effects. This lets the whole team - cast, crew, actors and technical team to practice the final version of the show to make sure nothing goes wrong

=== Amusement park industry ===
In the amusement and theme park industry, dark rides featuring special effects based on various technology have occasionally been operated in early phases described as technical rehearsals. Prior to the opening of Epic Universe on May 22, 2025, Universal operated the whole theme park in technical rehearsal to limited numbers of guests.

== Roles ==
Technical rehearsals rely on a team of creative and technical specialists who handle a specific aspect of the show. A typical tech rehearsal includes the following roles:

- Director – Oversees the overall artistic vision of the production and has final approval on any technical changes related to pacing, blocking, or storytelling.
- Stage manager – Manages the rehearsal process by calling cues, making technical notes, and being the primary communicator between the creative and technical teams.
- Lighting designer, lighting operator – Programs and runs lighting cues while adjusting color, focus, and intensity etc., to align with the lighting design for each scene.
- Sound designer, sound engineer – Balances audio levels for music, sound effects, and microphones, and resolving audio issues.
- Scenic/stage crew – Testing and maintaining safety for moving set elements such as fly systems, turntables, and automated scenery.
- Costume supervisor, dressers – Checks costume changes, mic packs, and dress-change areas to make sure that wardrobe elements do not interfere with technical elements.

== See also ==
- Technical week
