= Art Buchwald =

American humorist

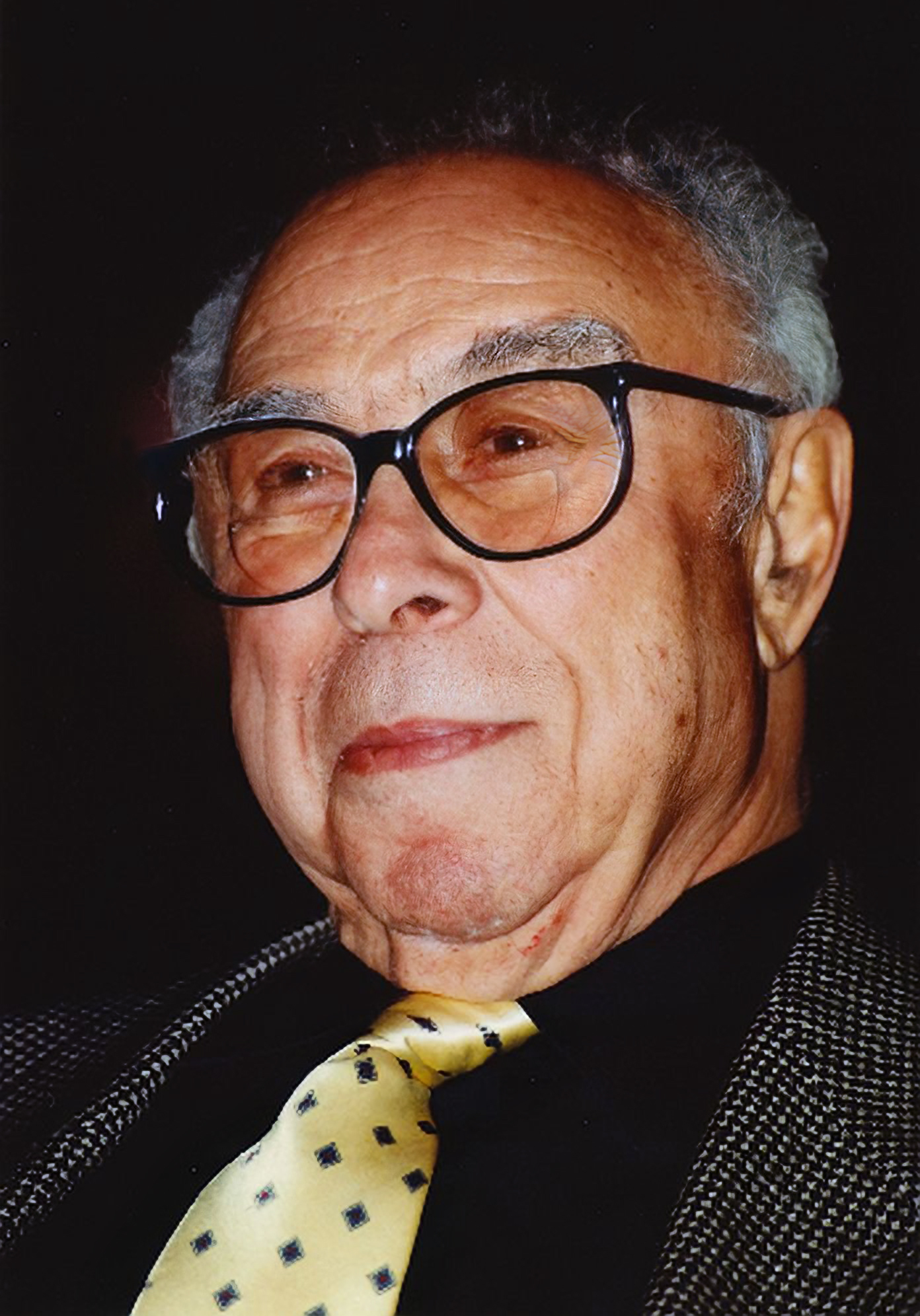
- Buchwald in 1995
- Born: October 20, 1925; New York City, U.S.
- Died: January 17, 2007 (aged 81); Washington, D.C., U.S.
- Education: University of Southern California
- Occupation: Writer
- Spouse: Ann McGarry
- Children: 3
- Parent(s): Helen and Joseph Buchwald

Arthur Buchwald (BUK-wahld; October 20, 1925 – January 17, 2007) was an American humorist best known for his column in The Washington Post. At the height of his popularity, it was published nationwide as a syndicated column in more than 500 newspapers. His column focused on political satire and commentary.

Buchwald had first started writing as a paid journalist in Paris after World War II, where he wrote a column on restaurants and nightclubs, "Paris After Dark", for the Paris Herald Tribune, which later became the International Herald Tribune. He was part of a large American expatriate community in those years. After his return to the United States in 1962, he continued to publish his columns and books for the rest of his life. He received the Pulitzer Prize in 1982 for Outstanding Commentary, and in 1991 was elected to the American Academy and Institute of Arts and Letters, in addition to other awards.

== Early life ==
Buchwald was born in New York City in 1925, to an Austrian-Hungarian Jewish immigrant family. He was the son of Joseph Buchwald, a curtain manufacturer, and Helen (Klineberger). His mother suffered from depression and was later committed to a mental hospital, where she lived for 35 years. Buchwald was the youngest of four children, with three older sisters: Alice, Edith, and Doris. When the family business failed at the start of the Great Depression, Buchwald's father put the boy in the Hebrew Orphan Asylum in New York City, as he could not care for him. Buchwald was soon placed in foster homes, and lived in several, including a Queens boarding house for sick children (he had rickets because of poor nutrition). It was operated by Seventh-day Adventists. He stayed in the foster home until he was 5.

Buchwald was eventually reunited with his father and sisters; the family settled in Hollis, a residential community in Queens. Buchwald did not graduate from Forest Hills High School, and ran away from home at age 17.

He wanted to join the United States Marine Corps during World War II but was too young to join without parental or legal guardian consent. He bribed a drunk with half a pint of whiskey to sign as his legal guardian. From October 1942 to October 1945, Buchwald served with the Marines as part of the 4th Marine Aircraft Wing. He spent two years in the Pacific Theater and was discharged from the service as a sergeant. He said of his time in the Marines, "In the Marines, they don't have much use for humorists, they beat my brains in."

== Journalism ==
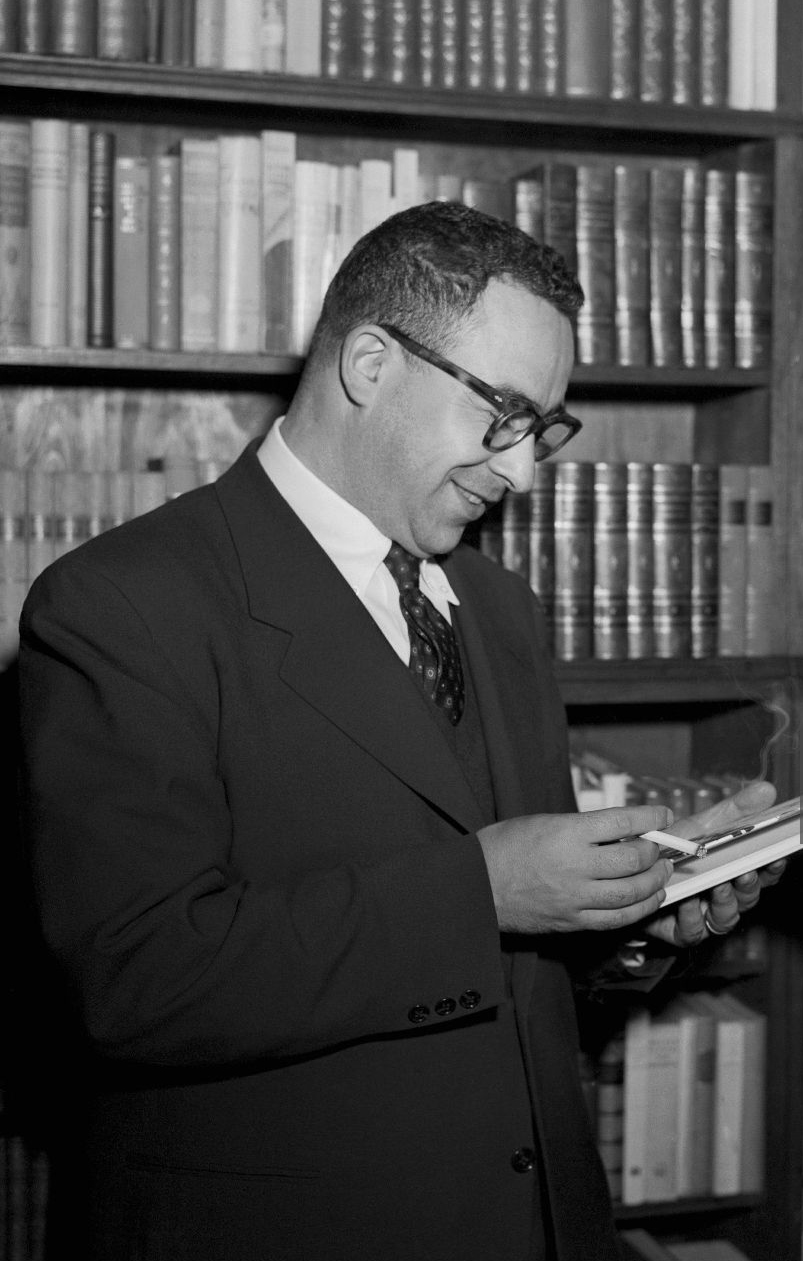
Buchwald in 1953

On his return, Buchwald enrolled at the University of Southern California in Los Angeles on the G.I. Bill, despite not having graduated from high school. At USC he became managing editor of the campus magazine Wampus; he also wrote a column for the college newspaper, the Daily Trojan. The university permitted him to continue his studies after learning he had not graduated from high school, but deemed him ineligible for a degree. After establishing his national reputation and winning the Pulitzer Prize, he was invited as a commencement speaker in 1993 and received an honorary doctorate from the university.

In 1949, Buchwald left USC and bought a one-way ticket to Paris. He got a job as a correspondent for Variety in Paris. In January 1950, he took a sample column to the offices of the European edition of the New York Herald Tribune. Titled "Paris After Dark", it was filled with scraps of offbeat information about Parisian nightlife. Buchwald was hired and joined the editorial staff as a restaurant and nightclub reviewer. His column caught on quickly, and in 1951 Buchwald started another column, "Mostly About People". They were fused into one under the title "Europe's Lighter Side". Buchwald's columns soon began to attract readers on both sides of the Atlantic.

In postwar Paris, Buchwald met many American expatriate writers, going about with Janet Flanner, E.B. White, Allen Ginsberg, Gregory Corso, and Thornton Wilder. He also had brief encounters with the artist Pablo Picasso, writer Ernest Hemingway, directors Orson Welles and Mike Todd, actress Audrey Hepburn, and attorney Roy Cohn.

In November 1952, Buchwald wrote a column to amuse his linguistically sophisticated readers in retelling the story of the first Thanksgiving with the inclusion of translations, including fractured ones such as "Merci Donnant" for "Thanksgiving". Buchwald considered it his favorite column. He published it every Thanksgiving during his lifetime.

Buchwald enjoyed the notoriety he received when U.S. President Dwight Eisenhower's press secretary, James Hagerty, took seriously a spoof press conference report claiming that reporters asked questions about the president's breakfast habits. After Hagerty called his own conference to denounce the article as "unadulterated rot", Buchwald famously retorted, "Hagerty is wrong. I write adulterated rot." On August 24, 1959, Time magazine, in reviewing the history of the European edition of The Herald Tribune, reported that Buchwald's column had achieved an "institutional quality".

While in Paris, Buchwald became the only correspondent to substantively interview famous American singer Elvis Presley, who had entered the U.S. Army. They met at the Prince de Galles Hotel, where the soon-to-be Sergeant Presley was staying during a week-end off from his army stint in Germany. Presley's impromptu performances at the piano at Le Lido nightclub, as well as his singing for the showgirls after most of the customers had left, became legendary after Buchwald included it in his memoir, I'll Always Have Paris (1995).

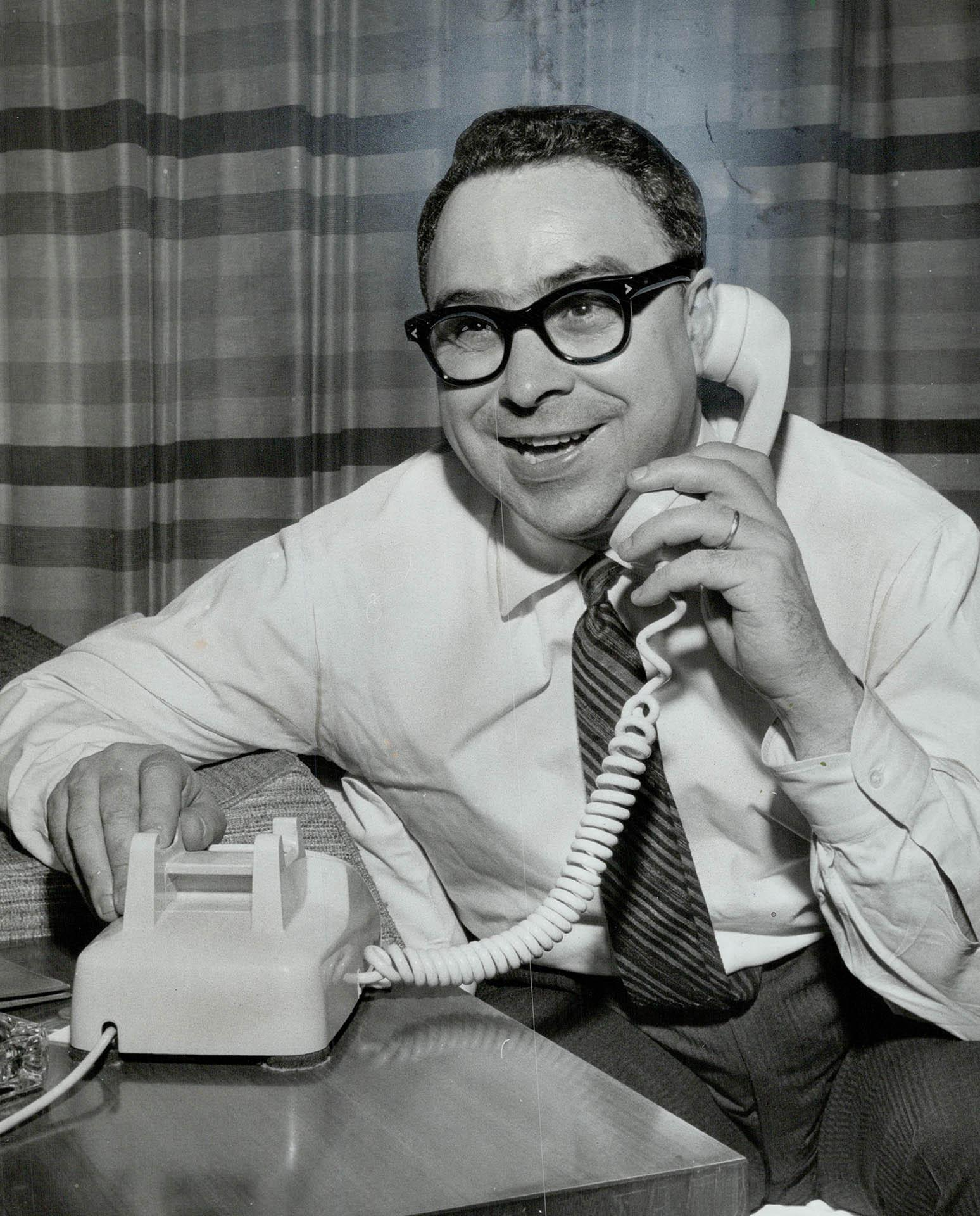
Buchwald in 1962

Buchwald returned to the United States in 1962. He wrote as a columnist for The Washington Post, frequently commenting on the political scene. When once asked where he got his ideas, he said simply that he read the newspaper every day. He could not make up the absurd situations that were reported. His column was syndicated by Tribune Media Services. His column appeared in more than 550 newspapers at its height. He also wrote memoirs and other books, a total of more than 30 in his lifetime. He also contributed fumetti to Marvel Comics' Crazy Magazine, which tore apart statistics regarding 1970s campus life.

== Marriage and family ==
During his time in Paris, Buchwald met Ann McGarry, and they married. She was an Irish-American apprentice couturier from Pennsylvania. After returning to the United States, they later adopted three children. They lived in Washington, D.C., where he wrote for The Washington Post. They spent most summers at their house in Vineyard Haven on Martha's Vineyard. After 40 years of marriage, the couple separated, and then decided to get a divorce. However, before the divorce proceedings could start, Ann was diagnosed with lung cancer, and died in 1994.

== Film ==
Buchwald had a cameo in Alfred Hitchcock's To Catch a Thief (1955). Near the beginning of the movie, an issue of the Paris Herald Tribune is shown in close-up to highlight a column, bylined by Buchwald, about jewel thefts on the French Riviera, which sets up the plot.

He contributed to the English dialogue of Jacques Tati's Playtime. Buchwald also had a cameo role in a 1972 episode, "Moving Target", of the TV series Mannix. He is shown in Frederick Wiseman's 1983 film The Store delivering a tribute to Stanley Marcus, the store's owner.

In 1988, Buchwald and partner Alain Bernheim filed suit against Paramount Pictures in a controversy over the Eddie Murphy film Coming to America. In the Buchwald v. Paramount lawsuit, Buchwald claimed Paramount had stolen his script treatment. He won, was awarded damages, and accepted a settlement from Paramount. The case was the subject of a 1992 book, Fatal Subtraction: The Inside Story of Buchwald v. Paramount.

== Criticism ==
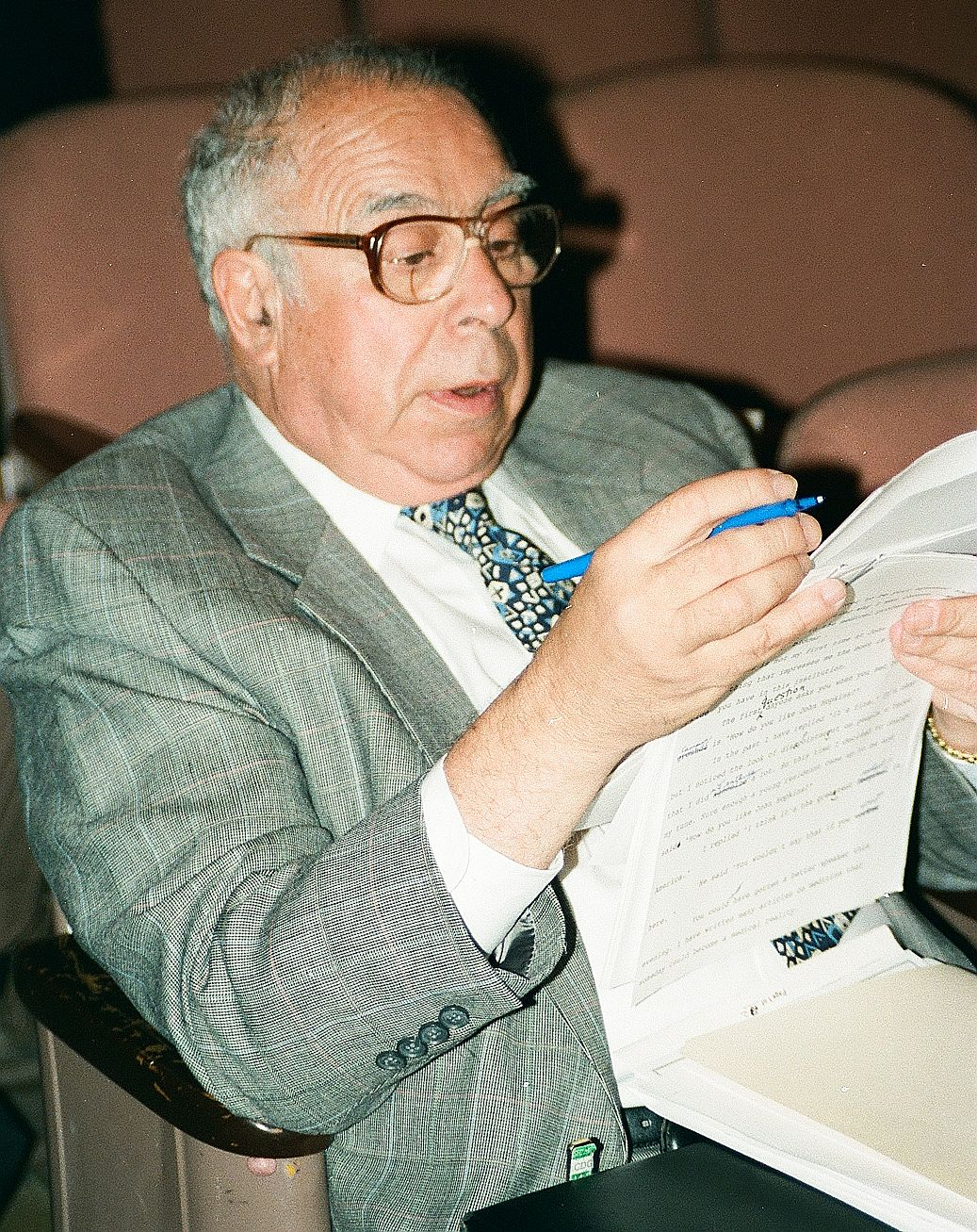
Buchwald editing his work, 1994

In Buchwald's later years, his detractors characterized the column as hackneyed, tiresome and not funny. Political analyst Norman Ornstein in 1991 said he thought Buchwald's column was more popular "outside the Beltway"; others disagreed.

Roy Bode, editor of the Dallas Times Herald, said that when his paper canceled Buchwald's column in 1989, the editors did not receive a single letter of protest. By contrast, when the paper cancelled the comic strip Zippy the Pinhead, so many readers complained that the editors were compelled to bring it back.

In September 2005, Timothy Noah wrote in Slate, "Yes, Buchwald still writes his column. No, it hasn't been funny for some time."

== Illness and death ==
Buchwald underwent hospitalization twice for mental disorders: once in 1963 for severe depression. In 1987, he was hospitalized for what was then diagnosed as an extreme episode of bipolar disorder, which he had probably had for years. He publicly recounted these experiences in 1999.

In 2000, at age 74, Buchwald suffered a stroke. He was hospitalized for more than two months. On February 16, 2006, the Associated Press reported that Buchwald had had a leg amputated below the knee and was staying at Washington Home and Hospice. The amputation was reportedly necessary because of poor circulation in the leg, resulting from diabetes.

Buchwald invited radio talk show presenter Diane Rehm to interview him. During the show, which aired on February 24, 2006, he revealed his decision to discontinue hemodialysis, which had previously been initiated to treat kidney failure, another result of his having diabetes mellitus. He described his decision as his "last hurrah", stating that, "If you have to go, the way you go is a big deal." He reported that he was "very happy with his choices" and was eating at McDonald's on a regular basis.

Buchwald was later interviewed by Miles O'Brien of CNN, in a segment aired on March 31, 2006. Buchwald discussed his living will, which documented his wishes not to be revived if he fell into a coma. As of the date of that interview, Buchwald was still writing a periodic column. In the interview, he described a dream in which he was waiting to take his "final plane ride".

Buchwald was interviewed by Fox News' Chris Wallace for a segment on May 14, 2006's edition of Fox News Sunday.

In June 2006, Buchwald left the hospice. He was again interviewed by Rehm and reported that his kidney was working. He said that he "blesses him every morning. Some people bless their hearts, I bless my kidney." He reported that he was looking forward to getting a new leg and visiting Martha's Vineyard. In July 2006, Buchwald returned to his summer home in Tisbury on Martha's Vineyard. While there, he completed a book titled Too Soon to Say Goodbye, about the five months he spent in the hospice. Eulogies that were prepared by his friends, colleagues, and family members and were never delivered (or not delivered until later) are included in the book.

On November 3, 2006, television news reporter Kyra Phillips interviewed Buchwald for CNN. Phillips had known Buchwald since 1989, when she had first interviewed him. On November 22, 2006, Buchwald was again featured on Rehm's show. He described himself as a "poster boy for hospices – because I lived."

External videos
- Art Buchwald memorial service, March 5, 2007, C-SPAN

In December 2006, in his final interview, he told nurse/writer Terry Ratner that he was also a poster boy for nurses. The article, "The 'Art' of Saying Goodbye", appeared in the January 2007 issues of Nursing Spectrum and NurseWeek, national nursing publications.

Buchwald died of kidney failure on January 17, 2007, at his son Joel's home in Washington, D.C. The next day the website of The New York Times posted a video obituary in which Buchwald said: "Hi. I'm Art Buchwald, and I just died."

== Awards ==
- In 1977, he received the S. Roger Horchow Award for Greatest Public Service by a Private Citizen, an award given out annually by Jefferson Awards.
- In 1982, Buchwald was awarded the Pulitzer Prize for Outstanding Commentary.
- In 1991, he was elected to the American Academy and Institute of Arts and Letters.
- In 1991, he received the World Humour Award, from the Workshop Library on World Humour.
- In 1994, he received the Golden Plate Award of the American Academy of Achievement.

== Books ==
Buchwald published numerous anthologies and collections of his columns, as well as memoirs.

- Paris After Dark (Imprimerie du Centre 1950. Also published by Herald Tribune, European Ed., S. A., 1953)
- Art Buchwald's Paris (Lion Library, 1956)
- I Chose Caviar (Victor Gollancz, 1957)
- The Brave Coward (Harper, 1957)
- More Caviar (Victor Gollancz, 1958)
- A Gift from the Boys (Harper, 1958)
- Don't Forget to Write (World Pub. Co., 1960)
- How Much is that in Dollars? (World Pub. Co., 1961)
- Is it Safe to Drink the Water? (PBK Crest Books, 1963)
- I Chose Capitol Punishment (World Pub. Co., 1963)
- ... and Then I Told the President: The Secret Papers of Art Buchwald (Weidenfeld & Nicolson, 1965)
- Son of the Great Society (Putnam, 1966)
- Have I Ever Lied to You?. New York: Putnam's Sons. 1968 – via Internet Archive.
- The Establishment is Alive and Well in Washington (Putnam, 1969)
- Counting Sheep; The Log and the Complete Play: Sheep on the Runway (Putnam, 1970)
- Oh, to be a Swinger (Vintage, 1970)
- Getting High in Government Circles (Putnam, 1971)
- I Never Danced at the White House (Putnam, 1973)
- "I Am Not a Crook" (Putnam, 1974)
- The Bollo Caper: A Fable for Children of All Ages (Doubleday, 1974)
- Irving's Delight: At Last! a Cat Story for the Whole Family! (McKay, 1975)
- Washington Is Leaking (Putnam, 1976)
- Down the Seine and Up the Potomac. New York: Putnam's Sons. 1977 – via Internet Archive.
- Best Cartoons of the World Miller Collection (Brown University) (Atlas World Press Review, 1978)
- Art Buchwald by Leonard Probst, transcript of an interview conducted by Leonard Probst, March 31 and April 1, 1978. (American Jewish Committee, Oral History Library, 1978)
- The Buchwald Stops Here (Putnam, 1979)
- Seems Like Yesterday Ann Buchwald interrupted by Art Buchwald (Putnam, 1980)
- Laid Back in Washington (Putnam, 1981)
- While Reagan Slept (Putnam, 1983)
- You Ask, Buchwald Answers (Listen & Learn U.S.A.!, 1983)
- The Official Bank-Haters' Handbook also by Joel D. Joseph (Natl Pr Books, 1984)
- "You Can Fool All of the People All the Time" (Putnam, 1985)
- I Think I Don't Remember (Putnam, 1987)
- Whose Rose Garden Is It Anyway? (Putnam, 1989)
- Lighten Up, George (Putnam, 1991)
- Leaving Home: A Memoir (Putnam, 1994)
- I'll Always Have Paris: A Memoir (Putnam, 1995)
- Stella in Heaven: Almost a Novel (Putnam, 2000)
- We'll Laugh Again. New York: Putnam's Sons. 2002. ISBN 9780399148927 – via Internet Archive.
- Beating Around the Bush (Seven Stories, 2005)

=== Autobiography ===
- Too Soon to Say Goodbye (Bantam Books 2006) ISBN 1-58836-574-3

== See also ==
- Sally Pierone
