= Rehearsal report =

A rehearsal report is a form created by a stage manager to record notes which arise during a rehearsal and affect other production departments (e.g. sound, set, costumes and lighting). In addition, the rehearsal report serves as a record of starting and ending times for a rehearsal, starting and end of breaks, lateness of actors or staff and other incidentals.

Rehearsal reports are generally filled out before, during and after the actual rehearsal. Before the rehearsal officially begins, the report should have the names of actors needed for the scenes and any notes about excused absences/tardies. It should also contain the date, rehearsal number, and the time that the rehearsal was to have started, as well as the actual starting time. During the rehearsal, the stage manager (and/or their assistants) note what is worked on and when, the timing of breaks and any design-related questions that may come up. Any incidents such as injuries are also noted in the report. After rehearsal, the stage manager should check in with the director and record all the production notes that the director makes on the report.

Rehearsal reports should be given to the heads of all departments and posted in a designated area for the production team as soon as possible.

The sections featured on a rehearsal report vary from form to form, but generally they all have a section for costumes, lights, props, scenery, fittings, sound, schedule, and actors. There should also be a space to record the rehearsal date, location, and number. The rehearsal report should also have the name of the production and stage manager in charge of that particular rehearsal.
