= Hell week =

Hell week may refer to:

- Hazing in Greek letter organizations
- Dead week, the period before and during final exams at universities
- A rigorous component of United States Navy SEAL selection and training: United States Navy SEAL selection and training#Phase 1: Physical conditioning (7 weeks)
- A police academy's most rigorous component
- Technical week of theatre rehearsals
- "Hell Week", season 3 episode 53 of the 1985 TV series MacGyver: MacGyver (1985 TV series)
- "Hell Week" (Scream Queens), the second episode of the 2015 horror comedy series Scream Queens
