= Dress rehearsal =

Rehearsal shortly before the first performance

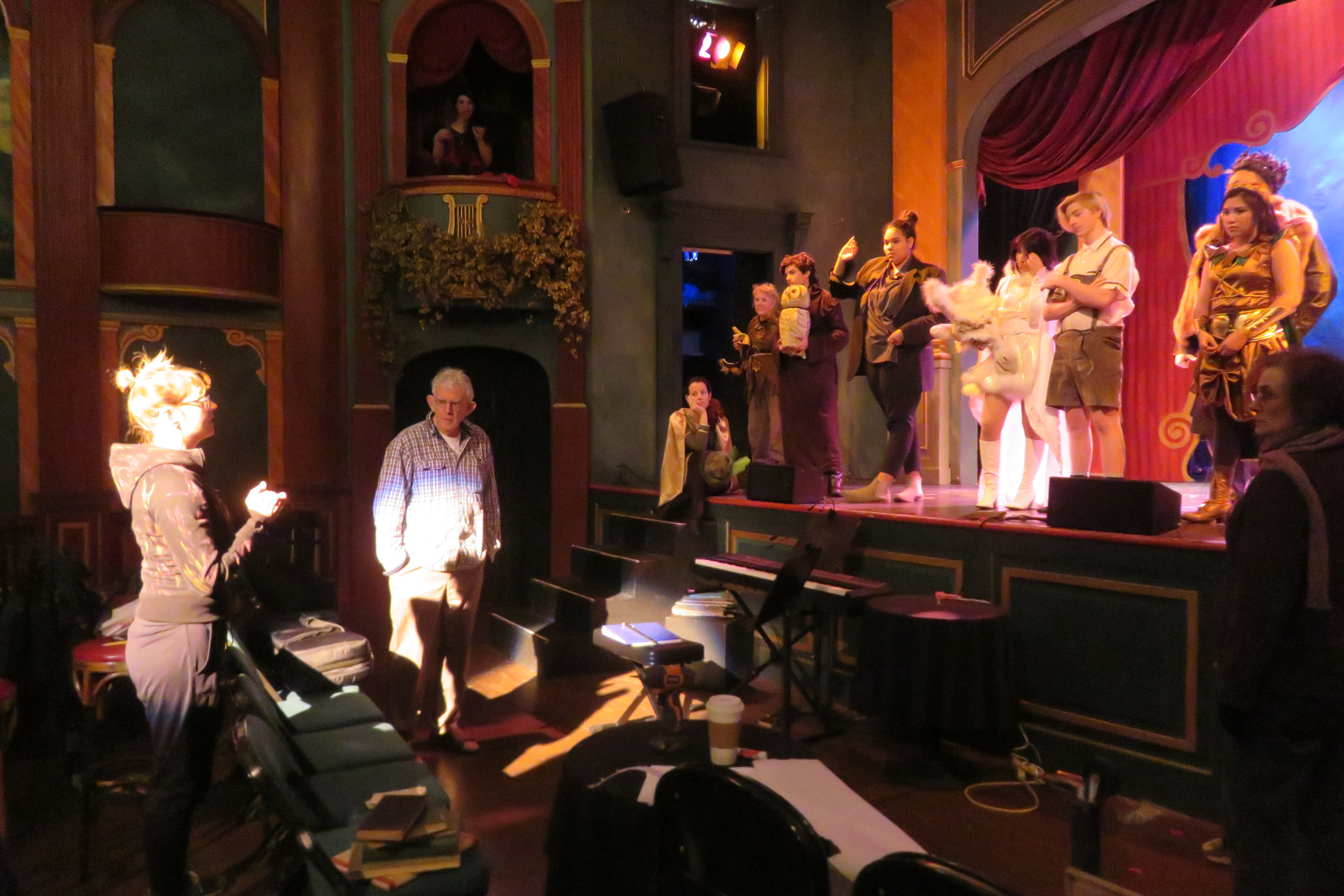
Director talking to the cast during a dress rehearsal of Snow White

The dress rehearsal is a full-scale rehearsal shortly before the first performance where the actors and/or musicians perform every detail of the performance. Dress rehearsal is often the final rehearsal before the premiere.

For a theatrical performance, cast members wear their costumes (hence "dress"). The actors also typically use all props and set pieces. Scripts are unusual for actors at this late rehearsal stage, while the stage manager and director usually continue using scripts even during dress rehearsal and actual performances.

For a musical performance, the dress rehearsal is the final rehearsal before the performance; initial rehearsals will often involve working on challenging sections of the musical piece or pieces, but during the dress rehearsal, the piece or pieces are typically played in their entirety.

For a dance performance, the dress rehearsal is the final rehearsal of a live show shortly before the show. It is a rehearsal conducted as if it were a live performance to ensure perfection for the actual show.
