= TechWeek (magazine) =

Bi-weekly technology magazine

TechWeek was a bi-weekly technology magazine owned by Metro States Media, a company headquartered in Sunnyvale, California. It had a controlled circulation of about 100,000. Its audience was people in the Silicon Valley who were interested in technology. It regularly featured a comic strip by Rudy Park.

== History ==
The magazine began in 1998. Tim Graham, the editor-in-chief, said that the magazine created a large following in its reader base but never managed to establish the same connection with our advertisers

On November 27, 2000, the magazine published its final issue and announced that publication was ceasing. Graham said that several factors, including the migration of advertising to the internet, the failure to invest enough funds in advertising, and "bad timing" caused it to close. The magazine used technologically advanced advertising methods funded with $4 million, but did not make money from them.
