= Rehearsal =

Practice performance

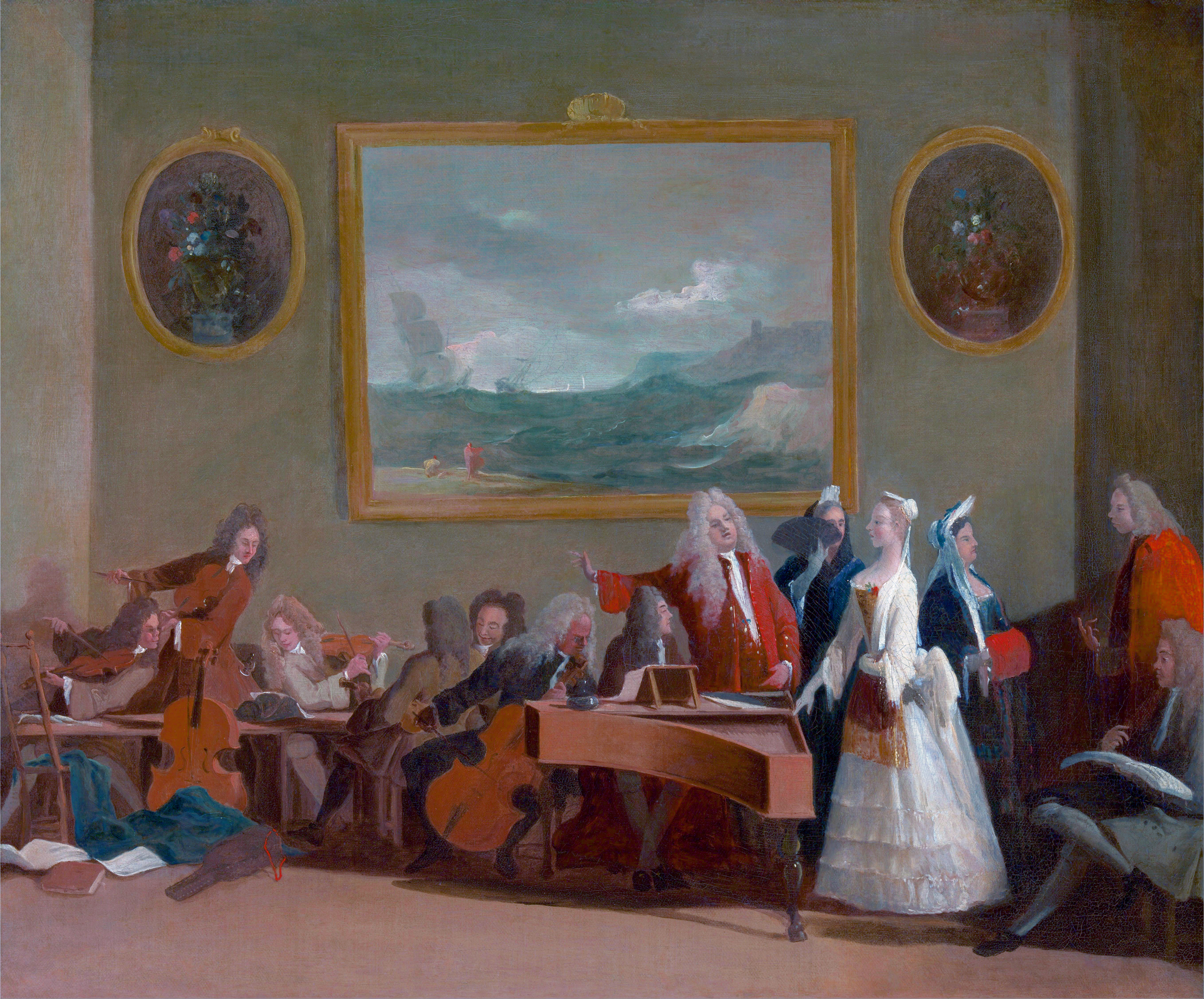
Marco Ricci's "Prove per un'opera" ("Rehearsal of an Opera") depicts Pyrrhus and Demetrius being rehearsed at the Haymarket Theatre in 1709.

A rehearsal is an activity in the performing arts that occurs as preparation for a performance in music, theatre, dance and related arts, such as opera, musical theatre and film production. It is undertaken as a form of practising, to ensure that all details of the subsequent performance are adequately prepared and coordinated. The term rehearsal typically refers to ensemble activities undertaken by a group of people. For example, when a musician is preparing a piano concerto in their music studio, this is called practising, but when they practice it with an orchestra, this is called a rehearsal. The music rehearsal takes place in a music rehearsal space.

A rehearsal may involve as few as two people, as with a small play for two actors, an art song by a singer and pianist or a folk duo of a singer and guitarist. On the other end of the spectrum, a rehearsal can be held for a very large orchestra with over 100 performers and a choir. A rehearsal can involve only performers of one type, as in an a cappella choir show, in which a group of singers perform without instrumental accompaniment or a play involving only theatre actors; it can involve performers of different instruments, as with an orchestra, rock band or jazz "big band"; vocal and instrumental performers, as with opera and choral works accompanied by orchestra; or a mix of actors, vocalists, instrumentalists and dancers, as with musical theatre.

Rehearsals of small groups, such as small rock bands, jazz quartets or organ trios may be held without a leader; in these cases, the performers jointly determine how to run the rehearsal, which songs to practice, and so on. Some small groups may have their rehearsals led by a bandleader. Almost all mid- to large-group performances have a person who leads the rehearsals; this person may be a bandleader in a rock, country, or jazz setting; conductor in classical music (including opera); director in theatre or musical theatre; or film director for movies.

While the term is most commonly used in the performing arts to refer to preparation for a public presentation, the term is also used to refer to the preparation for other anticipated activities, such as wedding guests and couples practicing a wedding ceremony, paramedics practicing responding to a simulated emergency, or troops practicing for an attack using a mock-up of the building.

== Dress rehearsal ==
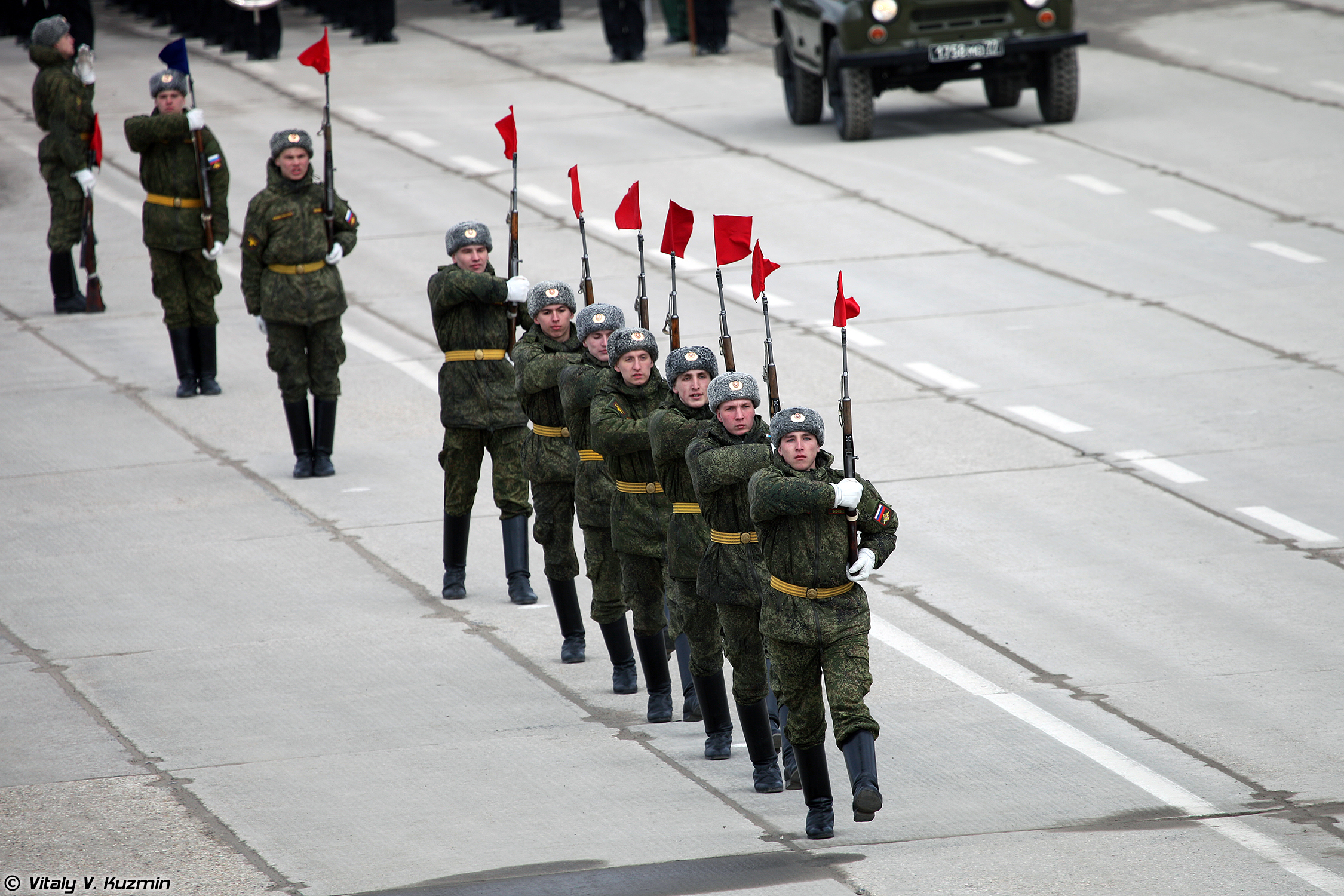
Russian Ground Forces Guards during a dress rehearsal for a military parade in Alabino, Moscow Oblast.

The dress rehearsal is a full-scale rehearsal where the actors and/or musicians perform every detail of the performance. For a theatrical performance, cast members wear their costumes. The actors may use props and backdrops and do not use scripts although the stage manager and director might do so.

For a musical performance, the dress rehearsal does not require wearing formal concert outfits (such as, tuxedos and gowns). In music, the dress rehearsal is the final rehearsal before the performance; initial rehearsals will often involve working on challenging sections of the piece or pieces, but during the dress rehearsal, the piece or pieces are typically played in their entirety.

== Theatre or opera house ==
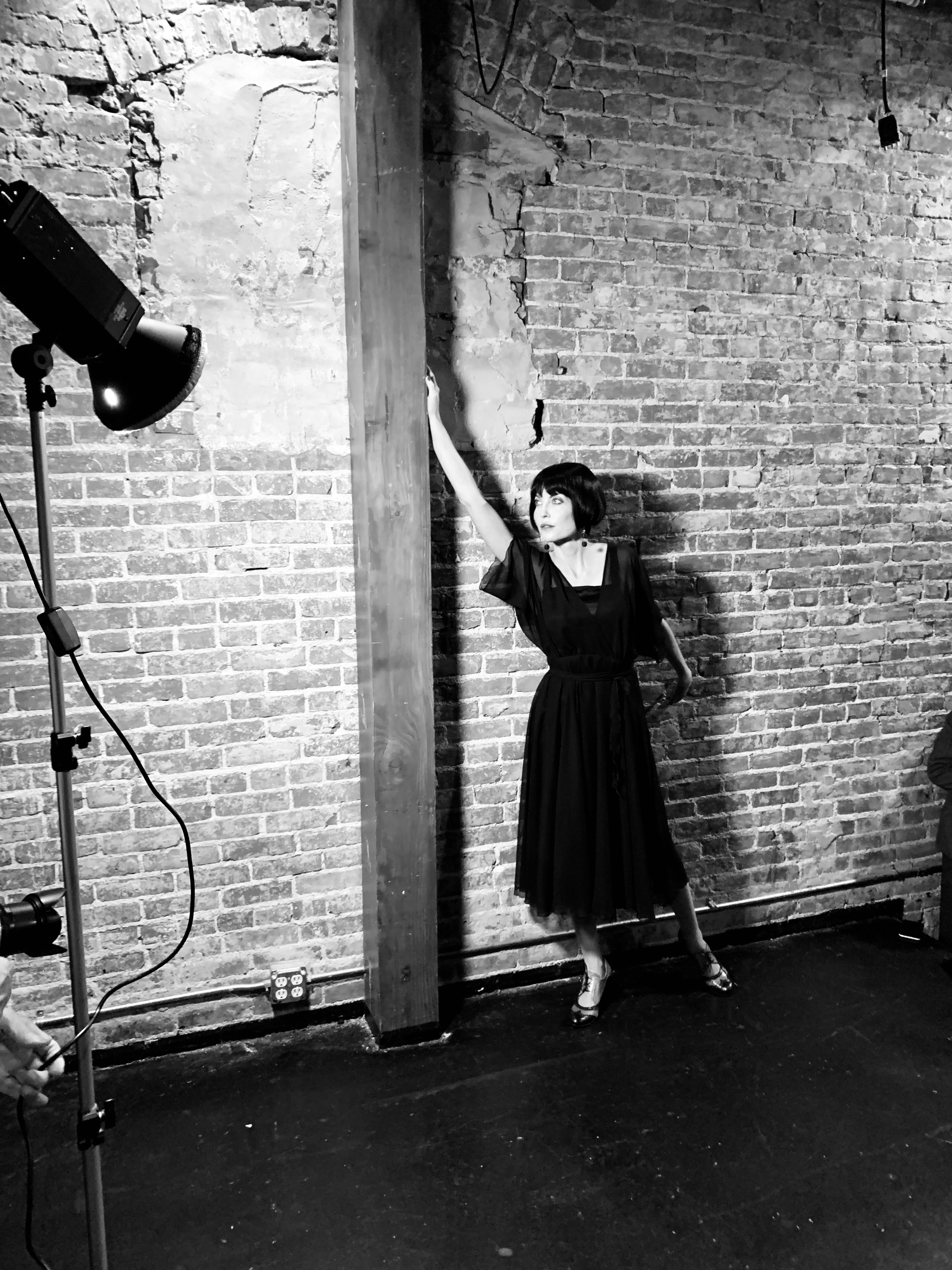
Laura Liguori playing Lilya Brik during a production rehearsal of Mayakovsky and Stalin.

In theatre, a performing arts ensemble rehearses a work in preparation for performance before an audience. Rehearsals that occur early in the production process are sometimes referred to as "run-throughs". Typically, a run-through does not involve most of the technical aspects of a performance, such as costumes, lights, and sound and is primarily used to assist performers in learning dialogue or music and to solidify aspects of blocking, choreography, and stage movement.

A "cue to cue" or "Q-2-Q" is a type of technical rehearsal and is intended primarily for the lighting and audio technicians involved in a performance although they are of great value to the entire ensemble. It is intended to allow the technicians and stage manager to rehearse the technical aspects of a performance (when lights have to be turned on, sound effects triggered, and items rolled on and off the stage) and to identify and resolve any glitches that might arise. Performers do not typically rehearse entire scenes during a Q-2-Q but instead perform dialogue or actions only that are used by the stage manager as a marker for when to initiate technical sequences or cues (hence the title). Abbreviated Q-2-Qs in which only the opening and closing sequences of each act or scene are performed are sometimes referred to as "tops and tails". It is rare for any but the most technically-complex performances to have Q-2-Q rehearsals other than during technical week.

Q-2-Qs are often preceded by a "dry tech" in which the technicians rehearse their technical cues (such as turning on stage lights or triggering sound effects or recorded music) without the actual performers being present at the rehearsal. A "dress rehearsal" is a rehearsal or series of rehearsals in which the ensemble dresses in costume, as they will dress at the performance for the audience. The entire performance will be run from beginning to end, exactly as the real performances will be, including pauses for intermissions. An "open dress" is a dress rehearsal to which specific individuals have been invited to attend as audience members. They may include patrons (who pay a reduced ticket price), family and friends of the ensemble, or reviewers from the media. The dress rehearsal is often the last set of rehearsals before the concert performance and falls at the end of technical week. A "preview", although technically a performance as there is a full audience, including individuals who have paid for admission, is arguably also a rehearsal in as far as it is common in complex performances for the production to stop or even to return to an earlier point in the performance if there are unavoidable or unresolvable problems. Audience members typically pay a lower price to attend a preview performance.

A "Put In" rehearsal is when a replacement comes in, they learn the show from the Dance Captain and Stage Manager and watch performances. After they have learned the show completely, they hold several rehearsals that are just run-throughs where the replacement is in full costume but the rest of the cast is only in rehearsal clothes. It is not uncommon for an incoming lead to only have had one or two run-throughs with the full company (which means they have only worked with their co-stars those few times). In some cases, they might never have a full run through/put in before they take over.

An "understudy rehearsal" is a dedicated rehearsal where understudies practice their assigned roles to ensure they are fully prepared to perform if a cast member is out. These rehearsals provide time on stage with the actual sets, costumes, and lighting to practice blocking, choreography, and technical cues, often led by a stage manager or dance captain. The goal is to maintain performance continuity and quality by giving understudies the confidence and skills needed to step in seamlessly with little to no notice

In traditional Japanese Noh theatre, performers primarily rehearse separately, rehearsing together only once, a few days before the show. That is to emphasize the transience of the show in the philosophy of "ichi-go ichi-e", "one chance, one meeting".

== Music ==
=== Professional classical ensembles ===
A professional orchestra, choir or chamber ensemble (e.g., string quartet or wind quintet) rehearses a piece (or song) in order to coordinate the rhythmic ensemble, ensure that the intonation of pitches of the different sections matches exactly, and coordinate the dynamics (changes in loudness and softness) and phrasing. A professional ensemble will typically only rehearse an orchestral work for two or three rehearsals which are held several days before the first performance. A professional ensemble is much less likely than an amateur orchestra to play the piece all the way through in the first rehearsals. Instead, a professional ensemble will typically review passages which pose challenges from the point of view of rhythmic or harmonic coordination. An example of a passage that might pose rhythmic coordination challenges would be a contemporary work which involves polyrhythms, in which one section of the orchestra plays a rhythm in 4/4 while another plays a melody in 5/4. An example of harmonic challenges would be a work in which the orchestra has to perform dissonant, complex harmonies, such as bitonality; an example would be the string section playing in C major while the brass section plays in F# major.

The conductor leads orchestral rehearsals, choosing sections to perform and calling out bar numbers or rehearsal letters to direct the orchestra to them. While classical conductors do not typically speak to direct the orchestra during concerts, during rehearsals, the conductor speaks to communicate their artistic vision for the piece and explain the "articulation" (note lengths), tone colors, and tempos they would like to use. During initial rehearsals, the conductor frequently stops the rehearsal to ask players or sections to change the way they are playing or provide guidance to the orchestra. For a choir, the choral conductor will lead rehearsals. In cases where a choir is preparing a piece which will be sung with an orchestra, the initial rehearsals may be led by the choir's conductor and the rehearsals closer to the concert by the orchestra's conductor.

For works that present a particular challenge for certain sections (e.g., a complex, exposed passage for the violas), orchestras may have sectional rehearsals or sectionals in which a section rehearses on their own under the direction of the principal player or, in some cases, also with the conductor (e.g., in the case of a very rhythmically challenging piece).

Prior to rehearsing a concerto with an orchestra, a soloist will rehearse it with a pianist substituting for the parts played by the orchestra (thus, two pianists in the case of piano concerti or a violinist and pianist in preparation for a violin concerto). To help with tempo in orchestral, solo, or chamber rehearsals, a metronome may be used to sound out the tempo prior to the commencement of a piece. For musical performances, a dress rehearsal does not imply dressing in concert dress. It is a final rehearsal before performance where generally the ensemble will run through the program as if there were an audience. In some orchestras, there may be a limited audience during the dress rehearsal (typically university music students or other invited guests).

=== Amateur classical ensembles ===
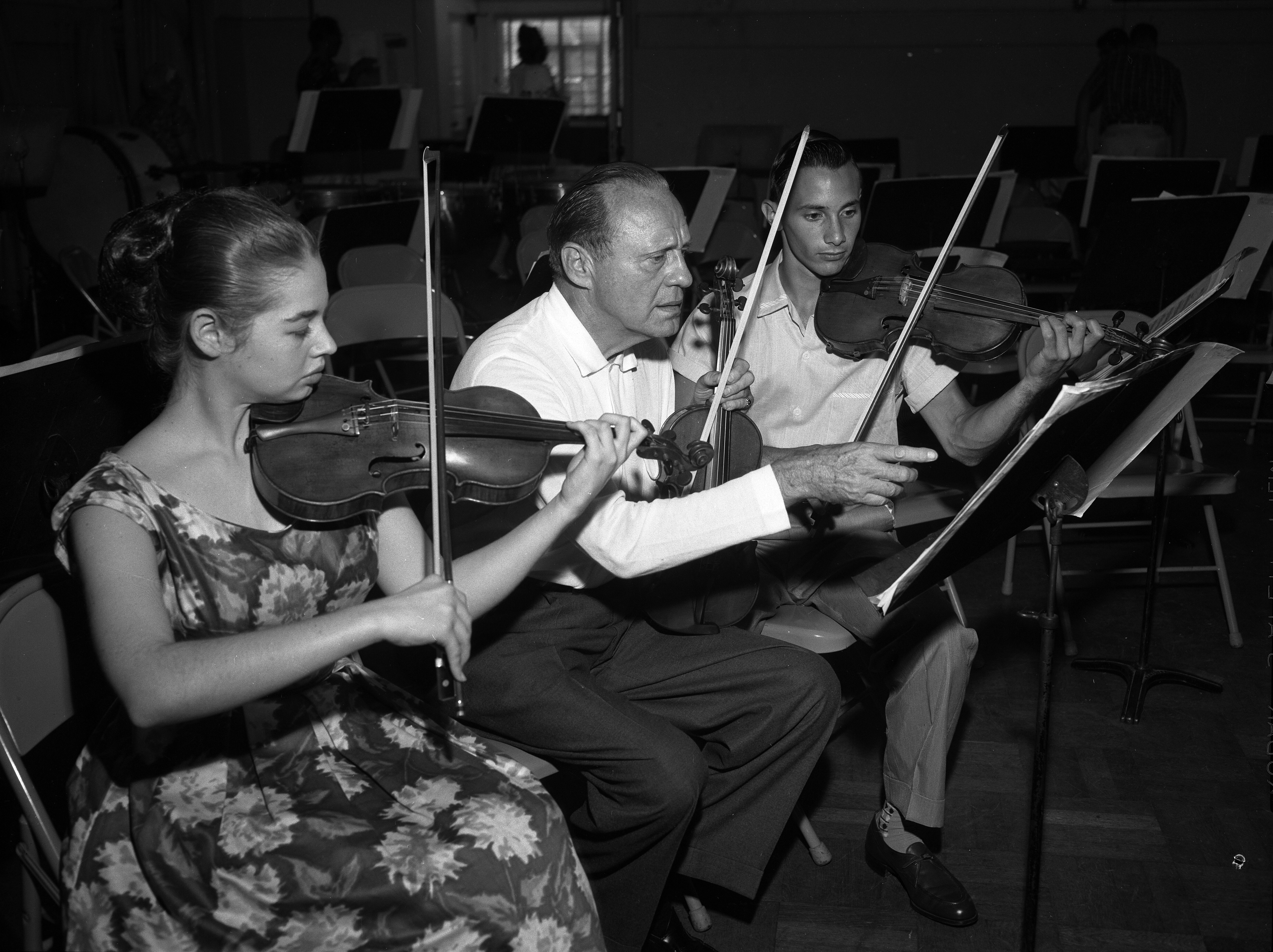
Jack Benny at a rehearsal with members of the California Junior Symphony Orchestra, 1959

Amateur orchestras or chamber ensembles, such as university or community groups, rehearse music for a number of reasons. While an amateur ensemble does rehearsals for many of the same reasons as a professional ensemble—to coordinate the rhythmic ensemble and intonation—with an amateur group the conductor has to do much more teaching to the orchestra. However, amateur musicians are much more likely to make note mistakes, transposition errors or play with incorrect intonation or rhythms; the conductor must point these issues out to the performers and give them advice on how to correct them. In amateur groups, players may not have strong ensemble skills, so the conductor may have to coach players about how to learn to blend their sound well with other sections or how to coordinate rhythmic passages that are played by different sections, or how to mark their part after they make an error to prevent the error from being repeated.

Rehearsals are also used to teach ensemble members about music history and basic performance practice, so that they can learn the different playing styles and tones used in music from different eras. As well, orchestra conductors select pieces so that players can learn new skills, such as more complicated rhythms. For an amateur ensemble, the rehearsals are used to give the players an opportunity to have repeated chances to learn to perform difficult passages in an ensemble context. Amateur choirs use rehearsals to build choral singing skills, such as singing with a good ensemble and with solid intonation and vocal tone. Amateur groups are much more likely than professional groups to hold sectional rehearsals. Another difference between rehearsals in an amateur orchestra and a professional orchestra is the number of rehearsals. A community orchestra or university ensemble may have ten or even fifteen rehearsals over several months to prepare a major symphony; a professional orchestra might prepare that same symphony in two rehearsals over two days.

In an amateur performance consisting of miscellaneous items, such as songs, theatrical performances, skits, and musical pieces, it is common to have "a walk through rehearsal" on the concert day. This "walk through" requires the musicians, singers and actors to walk on and off stage without actually performing their full pieces. Each soloist or ensemble has had a number of previous rehearsals to work on their specific song or piece. The "walk through" helps performers to remember which performers need to go on stage together (e.g., a jazz singer needs to go onstage with her piano accompanist and bass player), what materials or items are required (e.g., a string quartet will require four chairs and four music stands, in addition to their instruments), and which lighting or sound reinforcement system elements are required. For example, a comedian may want a dark stage with just a spotlight, whereas a choir may wish to have the entire stage lit.

=== Popular and traditional music ===
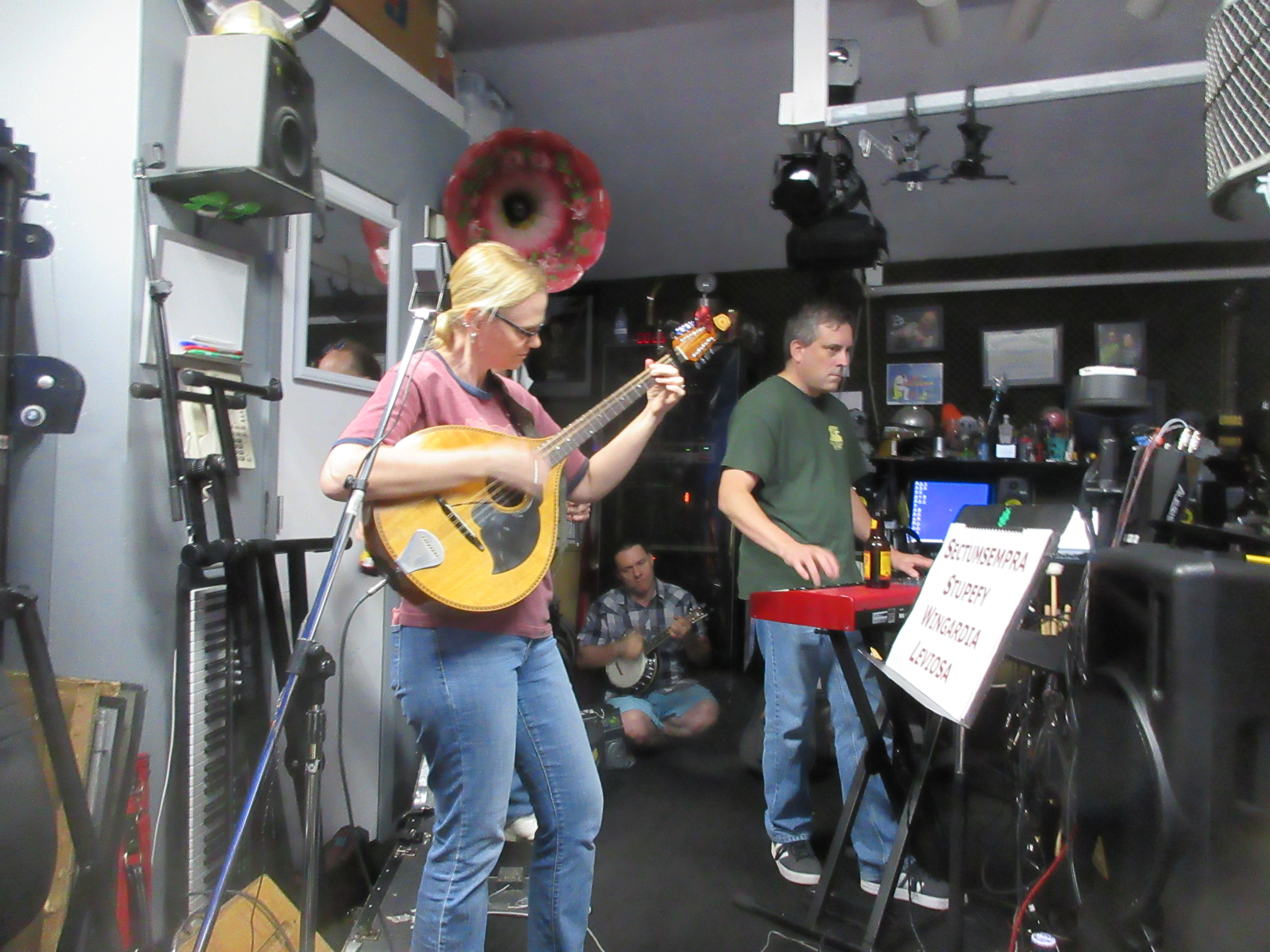
Steamcog band members at a rehearsal in September 2019.

Pop, rock, country and blues bands rehearse before performances. Rehearsals assemble the elements of a musical event, offering an experimental space where sounds and rhythms are put together and taken apart, played with, argued over, and refined. In these styles of music, rehearsals may be less formal than in a classical orchestra context. However, the purpose of rehearsals is the same: to ensure that all the band members can play and/or sing their parts with a good rhythmic ensemble, correct intonation, and the right "feel" and style. As with classical rehearsals, the earlier rehearsals for a show often focus more on working out the most difficult sections of songs, such as transitions from one tempo to another, modulations to a new key, or coordinating a duet between two solo instruments. The rehearsals closer to the performance are more likely to involve run-throughs of entire songs. Whereas Classical rehearsals are led by the conductor or choir leader, popular music band rehearsals are typically led by the bandleader, who is typically a member of the band. The bandleader sets the tempos for songs, chooses which instruments will have solos, and cues the start of new sections of a song.

The bandleader also typically chooses the members of the rhythm section: the instruments that provide the beat and the chord progression for songs. The rhythm section varies somewhat between genres, but in general it includes chordal instruments (e.g., piano, guitar, Hammond organ), a bass instrument (e.g., electric bass or double bass) and drum kit and/or percussion instruments.

For major touring bands that have a large stage show, with lights, pyrotechnics, massive moving props, and so on, there may be numerous rehearsals for the technical elements, in addition to the purely musical rehearsals held by the band.

When a pop or rock group is accompanied in a concert by an orchestra, a conductor is often used to lead the orchestra. In some pop or rock concerts where a large ensemble is performing, such as a group involving multiple guitar players, multiple percussionists, and the regular rhythm section, a conductor may also be used to lead the ensemble. For these types of shows, the conductor and the bandleader coordinate the rehearsals together.

== In other contexts ==
The use of rehearsals and dress rehearsals extends beyond the performing arts. When an organization has to learn how to implement a new process, it may rehearse the activity beforehand. Emergency-planning organizations often rehearse their preparations for responding to civil disasters; in some cases, there may even be actors playing the role of "injured people", so that emergency workers can learn how to provide assistance. Armies that are planning an attack on a certain target may create a mock-up of the target and rehearse the attack. The Israeli Defence Force used this approach in planning for the Raid on Entebbe, which freed air hijacking hostages. An accurate model of the airport building where the hostages were being held by gunmen was recreated so that the commandos could practice their attack maneuvers.

The introduction of major changes to complex industrial and technical fields, such as information systems is often rehearsed, particularly where this requires multiple activities to be coordinated and completed within time constraints. Many companies undertook major initiatives with their computer staff to rehearse the changes associated with the Year 2000 problem and the economic and monetary union of the European Union.

== See also ==
- Sitzprobe
- Stagecraft
- Technical rehearsal
