= Nursing Spectrum =

Magazine

The Nursing Spectrum is "a group of biweekly periodicals" that, in 1994, was acquired by Gannett. Both Gannett and the magazines continued, albeit with more than one parent corporation renaming.

== History ==
The periodical family was founded in 1987, acquired by Gannett in 1995, and became "12 regional nursing publications" by 2006. Name changed to Gannett Healthcare Group in 2006. GHG sold to OnCourse Learning in 2014.
