= Metro States Media =

Metro States Media, Inc. was a publication company headquartered in Sunnyvale, California. The company was owned by Dennis Riordan. It published TechWeek (till November 27, 2000) and NurseWeek (till August 14, 2016). NurseWeek was a magazine for registered nurses who resided in 20 U.S. states.
