= Technical week =

One-week period before a play's opening night where rehearsals have technical elements

Technical week (also called tech week, tech, techweek, production week or Hell Week) is the week prior to the opening night of a play, musical or similar production in which all of the technical elements (such as costumes, lights, sound, set and makeup) are present during rehearsal for the first time.

== Definition ==
Prior to this point, the actors may have been rehearsing in a separate rehearsal hall, or on the stage but without all technical elements present. At this point in the rehearsal progress, it is expected that the creative aspects of the production are ready. Actors have their lines memorized; lights, sound, scenery, and costumes are fully designed and completely constructed. If the production is a musical, then the pit orchestra has rehearsed the music completely, and any dancers are prepared with their choreography memorized. If the production has any form of stage combat, the actors should be already familiarized with their props and movement. Aspects of the set, performance, and any interactive digital media that the performers directly interact with will generally be introduced prior to technical week to avoid the actors using the time of technical week to learn these interactions. During technical week all of the various technical elements are fully implemented, making the rehearsals very similar to the actual performance.

== Purpose ==
The purpose of tech week is to rehearse the show with all technical elements in place. This allows the actors to become familiar with the set and costumes, the technical production crew to iron out unforeseen problems, and the director to see how everything comes together as an artistic whole. Tech week is when practical problems with the implementation of production elements are discovered. For example, an actor may report that their costume restricts their movement or that a hand prop is overly cumbersome. A set door that performed fine the week before may bang shut too loudly now that there are live microphones on the stage. While the primary purpose of technical week is to implement the technical elements, there is not a defined procedure that every show will use to go about technical week.

== Prior to technical week ==
Soon before the beginning of tech week, there is expected to be a "paper tech," which is a meeting between the stage manager, the director, and all of the designers to go over where all the cues are intended to be placed within the show to avoid conflict during tech week. The first few rehearsals are characterized by the frequent stopping and starting of scenes so that the technical crew can practice their necessary duties (such as executing their cues or scene changes correctly). Everything that goes wrong during a rehearsal is expected to be fixed by the next day.

== Controversy ==
Controversy exists surrounding the work hours of technical week, as the common daily schedule during this week is the "10 out of 12" schedule, in which the members of the production are actively working for ten hours out of the twelve-hour shifts. This movement sparked as actors and other production members do not believe productive work can occur in twelve-hour shifts, as well as the fact that two-hour breaks were often not fully given.

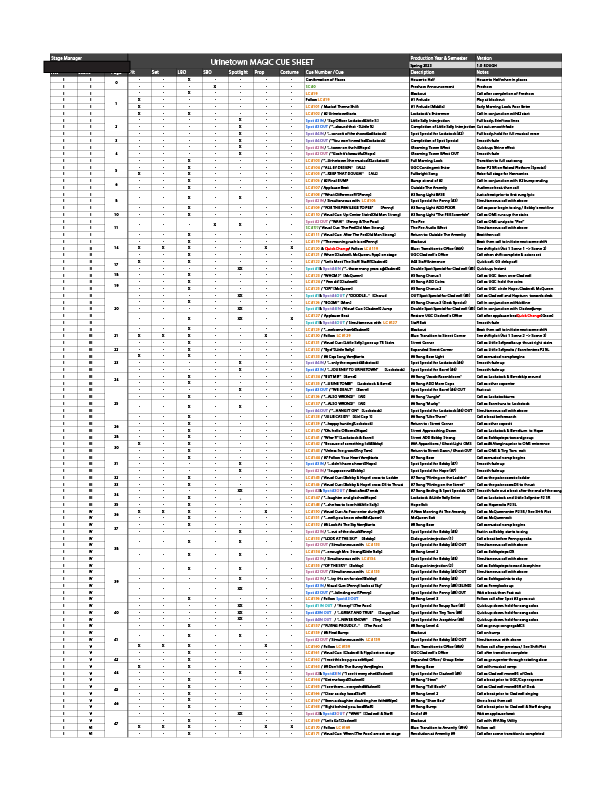
The light, sound, prop, and set cue list for a university production of "Urinetown"
