= Oscar Wilde =

Irish writer (1854–1900)

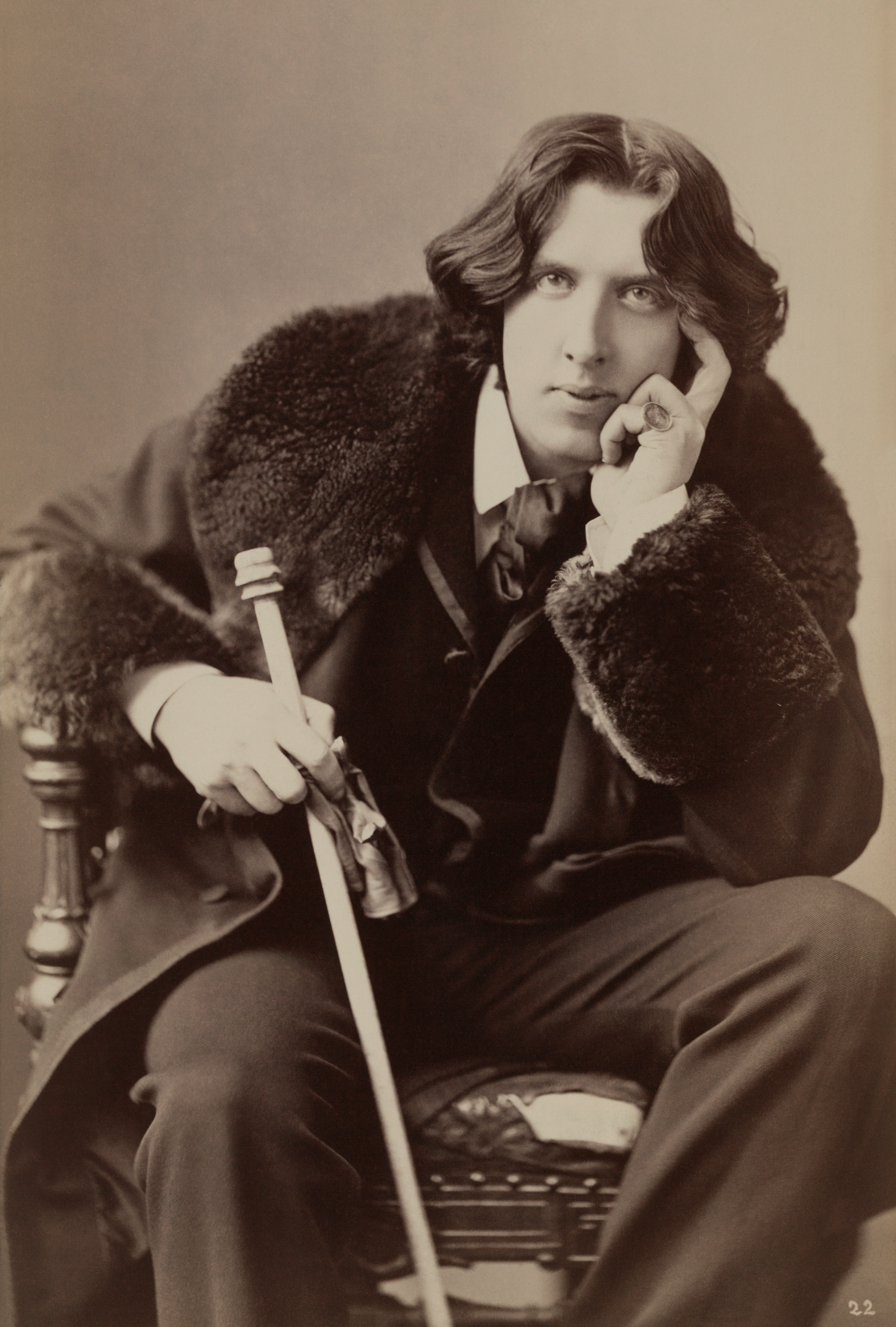
- Wilde photographed by Napoleon Sarony in 1882
- Born: Oscar Fingal O'Fflahertie Wills Wilde; 16 October 1854; Dublin, Ireland
- Died: 30 November 1900 (aged 46); Paris, France
- Resting place: Père Lachaise Cemetery
- Education: Trinity College Dublin (BA); Magdalen College, Oxford (BA)
- Occupations: Author; poet; playwright
- Spouse: Constance Lloyd (m. 1884; died 1898)
- Children: Cyril Holland; Vyvyan Holland
- Parents: Sir William Wilde (father); Jane, Lady Wilde (mother)
- Relatives: Willie Wilde (brother); Merlin Holland (grandson)
- Writing career
- Language: English; French; Ancient Greek
- Years active: 1881–1900
- Period: Victorian era
- Genres: Epigram; Drama; Short story; Criticism; Journalism; Gothic fiction; Children's literature
- Notable work: The Happy Prince and Other Tales; The Picture of Dorian Gray; The Importance of Being Earnest; An Ideal Husband; De Profundis
- Movements: Aesthetic movement; Decadent movement

Oscar Fingal O'Fflahertie Wills Wilde (Note: Wilde's third name is spelt 'O'Fflahertie' on his baptism certificate and in other important documents such as his 1895 police court statement, but different spellings were used during his lifetime and have been used ever since.) (16 October 1854 – 30 November 1900) was an Irish author, poet and playwright. After writing in different literary styles throughout the 1880s, he became one of the most popular and influential dramatists in London in the early 1890s. He was a key figure in the emerging Aestheticism movement of the late 19th century and is widely regarded as the greatest playwright of the Victorian era. Wilde is best known for his Gothic novel The Picture of Dorian Gray (1890), his epigrams, plays and bedtime stories for children, as well as his criminal conviction in 1895 for gross indecency and for practicing homosexual acts.

Wilde's parents were Anglo-Irish intellectuals in Dublin. In his youth, Wilde became conversant in French and German. At university, he read Greats; he demonstrated himself to be an exceptional classicist, first at Trinity College Dublin, then at Magdalen College, Oxford. He became associated with the emerging philosophy of aestheticism during this time, led by two of his tutors, Walter Pater and John Ruskin. After university, Wilde moved to London into fashionable cultural and social circles.

Wilde tried his hand at various literary activities: he wrote a play, published a book of poems, lectured in the United States and Canada on "The English Renaissance" in art and interior decoration, and then returned to London where he lectured on his American travels and wrote reviews for various periodicals. Known for his biting wit, flamboyant dress and glittering conversational skill, Wilde became one of the best-known personalities of his day. At the turn of the 1890s, he refined his ideas about the supremacy of art in a series of dialogues and essays, and incorporated themes of decadence, duplicity and beauty into what would be his only novel, The Picture of Dorian Gray (1890). Wilde returned to drama, writing Salome (1891) in French while in Paris, but it was refused a licence for England complicated by a prohibition on the portrayal of biblical subjects on the English stage. Undiscouraged, Wilde produced four society comedies in the early 1890s, which made him one of the most successful playwrights of late-Victorian London.

At the height of his fame and success, while An Ideal Husband (1895) and The Importance of Being Earnest (1895) were still being performed in London, Wilde issued a civil writ against John Sholto Douglas, the 9th Marquess of Queensberry for criminal libel. The Marquess was the father of Wilde's lover, Lord Alfred Douglas. The libel hearings unearthed evidence that caused Wilde to drop his charges and led to his own arrest and criminal prosecution for gross indecency with other males. The jury was unable to reach a verdict and so, a retrial was ordered. In the second trial, however, Wilde was convicted and sentenced to two years' hard labour, the maximum penalty, and jailed from 1895 to 1897. During his last year in prison he wrote De Profundis (published posthumously in abridged form in 1905, and in full in 1962 in his Complete Letters), a long letter that discusses his spiritual journey through his trials and is a dark counterpoint to his earlier philosophy of pleasure. On the day of his release, he caught the overnight steamer to France, never to return to Britain or Ireland. In France and Italy, he wrote his last work, The Ballad of Reading Gaol (1898), a long poem commemorating the harsh rhythms of prison life.

== Early life ==
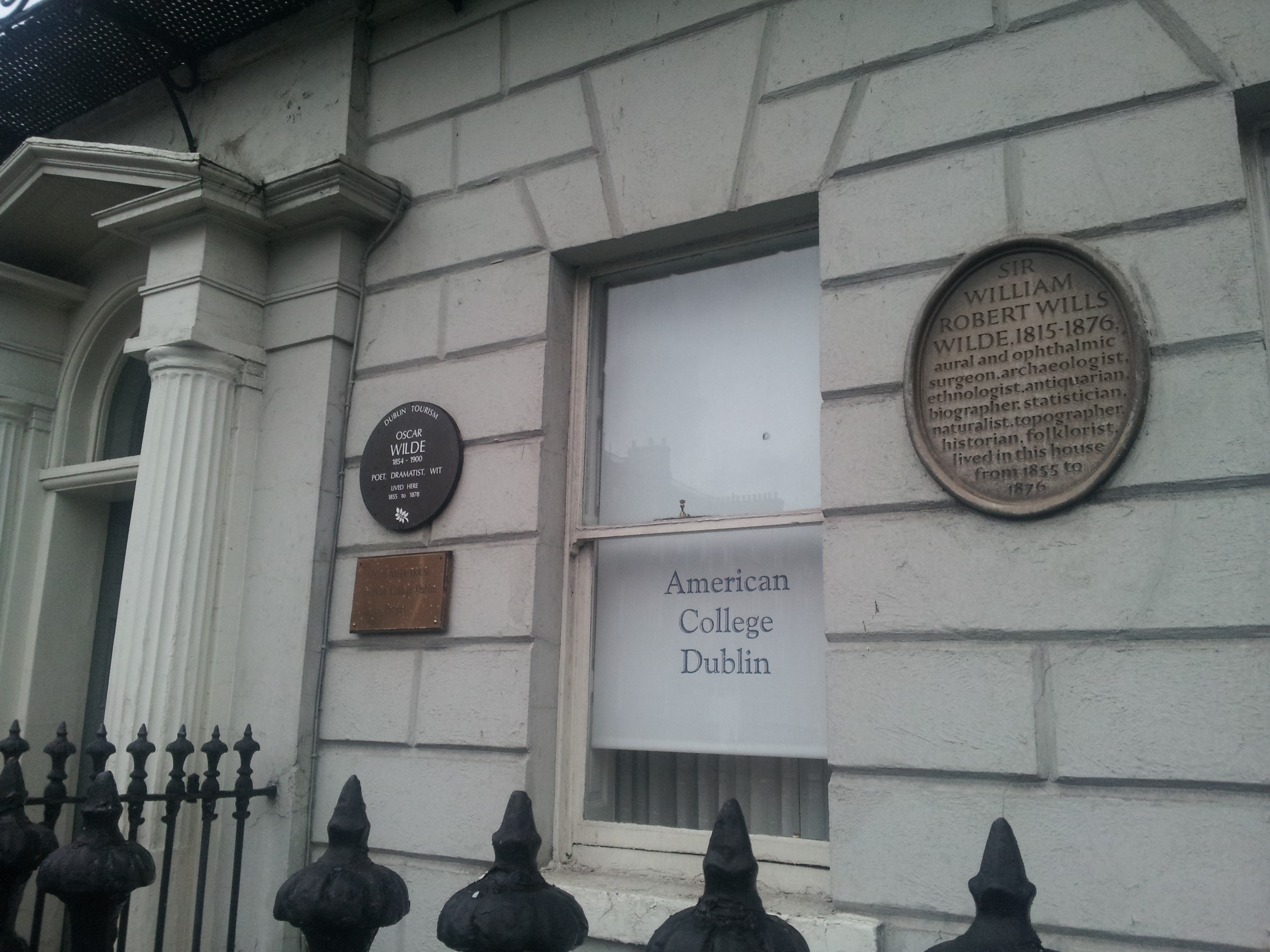
The Wilde family home on Merrion Square

Oscar Wilde was born on 16 October 1854 at 21 Westland Row, Dublin (now home of the Oscar Wilde Centre, Trinity College), the second of three children born to an Anglo-Irish couple: Jane, née Elgee, and Sir William Wilde. Oscar was two years younger than his brother, William (Willie) Wilde.

Jane Wilde was a niece (by marriage) of the novelist, playwright and clergyman Charles Maturin, who may have influenced her own literary career. She liked to believe, but without foundation, that she was of Italian ancestry, and under the pseudonym "Speranza" (the Italian word for 'hope'), she wrote poetry for the revolutionary Young Irelanders in 1848; she was a lifelong Irish nationalist. Jane Wilde read the Young Irelanders' poetry to Willie and Oscar, inculcating a love of these poets in her sons. Her interest in the neo-classical revival showed in the paintings and busts of ancient Greece and Rome in her home.

Sir William Wilde was Ireland's leading oto-ophthalmologic (ear and eye) surgeon and was knighted in 1864 for his services as medical adviser and assistant commissioner to the censuses of Ireland. He also wrote books about Irish archaeology and peasant folklore. A renowned philanthropist, his dispensary for the care of the city's poor at the rear of Trinity College Dublin (TCD) was the forerunner of the Dublin Eye and Ear Hospital, now located at Adelaide Road. On his father's side Wilde was descended from a Dutch soldier, Colonel de Wilde, who came to Ireland with King William of Orange's invading army in 1690, and numerous Anglo-Irish ancestors. On his mother's side, Wilde's ancestors included a bricklayer from County Durham, who emigrated to Ireland sometime in the 1770s.

Wilde was baptised as an infant in St. Mark's Church, Dublin, the local Church of Ireland (Anglican) church. When the church was closed, the records were moved to the nearby St. Ann's Church, Dawson Street. A Catholic priest in Glencree, County Wicklow, also claimed to have baptised Wilde and his brother Willie.

In addition to his two full siblings, Wilde had three paternal half-siblings, who were born out of wedlock before the marriage of his father: Henry Wilson, born in 1838 to one woman, and Emily and Mary Wilde, born in 1847 and 1849, respectively, to a second woman. Sir William acknowledged paternity of his children and provided for their education, arranging for them to be raised by his relatives.

The family moved to No 1 Merrion Square in 1855. With both Sir William and Lady Wilde's success and delight in social life, the home soon became the site of a "unique medical and cultural milieu". Guests at their salon included Sheridan Le Fanu, Charles Lever, George Petrie, Isaac Butt, William Rowan Hamilton and Samuel Ferguson.

Wilde's sister, Isola Francesca Emily Wilde, was born on 2 April 1857. She was named in tribute to Iseult of Ireland, wife of Mark of Cornwall and lover of the Cornish knight, Sir Tristan. She shared the name Francesca with her mother, while Emily was the name of her maternal aunt. Oscar would later describe how his sister was like "a golden ray of sunshine dancing about our home" and he was grief stricken when she died at the age of nine of a febrile illness. His poem "Requiescat" was written in her memory; the first stanza reads:

Tread lightly, she is near
Under the snow
Speak gently, she can hear
The daisies grow.

Until he was nine Wilde was educated at home, where a French nursemaid and a German governess taught him their languages. He joined his brother Willie at Portora Royal School in Enniskillen, County Fermanagh, which he attended from 1864 to 1871. At Portora, although he was not as popular as his older brother, Wilde impressed his peers with the humorous and inventive school stories he told. Later in life, he claimed that his fellow students had regarded him as a prodigy for his ability to speed read, claiming that he could read two facing pages simultaneously and consume a three-volume book in half an hour, retaining enough information to give a basic account of the plot. He excelled academically, particularly in the subject of classics, in which he ranked fourth in the school in 1869. His aptitude for giving oral translations of Greek and Latin texts won him multiple prizes, including the Carpenter Prize for Greek Testament. He was one of only three students at Portora to win a Royal School scholarship to Trinity in 1871.

In 1871, when Wilde was seventeen, his elder half-sisters Mary and Emily died aged 22 and 24, fatally burned at a dance at Drumacon, Co Monaghan. One of the sisters had brushed against the flames of a fire or a candelabra and her dress caught fire; in different versions, the man she was dancing with carried her and her sister down to douse the flames in the snow, or her sister ran her down the stairs and rolled her in the snow, causing her own muslin dress to catch fire too.

Until his early twenties, Wilde summered at Moytura House, a villa his father had built in Cong, County Mayo. There the young Wilde and his brother Willie played with George Moore.

== University education: 1870s ==
=== Trinity College Dublin ===
Wilde left Portora with a royal scholarship to read classics at Trinity College Dublin (TCD), from 1871 to 1874, sharing rooms with his older brother Willie Wilde. Trinity, one of the leading classical schools, placed him with scholars such as R. Y. Tyrell, Arthur Palmer, Edward Dowden and his tutor, Professor J. P. Mahaffy, who inspired his interest in Greek literature. As a student, Wilde worked with Mahaffy on the latter's book Social Life in Greece. Wilde, despite later reservations, called Mahaffy "my first and best teacher" and "the scholar who showed me how to love Greek things". For his part, Mahaffy boasted of having created Wilde; later, he said Wilde was "the only blot on my tutorship".

The University Philosophical Society also provided an education, as members discussed intellectual and artistic subjects such as the work of Dante Gabriel Rossetti and Algernon Charles Swinburne weekly. Wilde quickly became an established member – the members' suggestion book for 1874 contains two pages of banter sportingly mocking Wilde's emergent aestheticism. He presented a paper titled Aesthetic Morality. At Trinity, Wilde established himself as an outstanding student: he came first in his class in his first year, won a scholarship by competitive examination in his second and, in his finals, won the Berkeley Gold Medal in Greek, the university's highest academic award. He was encouraged to compete for a demyship, a half-scholarship worth £95 per year (equivalent to £9,300 in 2025), at Magdalen College, Oxford, which he won easily.

=== Magdalen College, Oxford ===
At Magdalen, he read Greats from 1874 to 1878. He applied to join the Oxford Union, but failed to be elected.

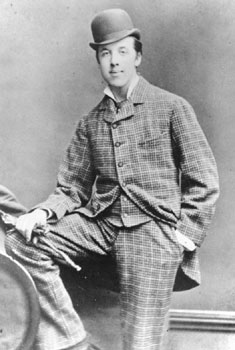
Oscar Wilde at Oxford in 1876

Attracted by its dress, secrecy and ritual, Wilde petitioned the Apollo Masonic Lodge at Oxford and was soon raised to the Sublime Degree of Master Mason. During a resurgent interest in Freemasonry in his third year, he commented he "would be awfully sorry to give it up if I secede from the Protestant Heresy". Wilde's active involvement in Freemasonry lasted only for the time he spent at Oxford; he allowed his membership of the Apollo University Lodge to lapse after failing to pay subscriptions.

Catholicism deeply appealed to him, especially its rich liturgy, and he discussed converting to it with clergy several times. In 1877, Wilde was left speechless after an audience with Pope Pius IX in Rome. He eagerly read the books of Cardinal Newman, a noted Anglican priest who had converted to Catholicism and risen in the church hierarchy. He became more serious in 1878, when he met the Reverend Sebastian Bowden, a priest in the Brompton Oratory who had received some high-profile converts. Neither Mahaffy nor Sir William, who threatened to cut off his son's funding, thought much of the plan; but Wilde, the supreme individualist, balked at the last minute from pledging himself to any formal creed. On the appointed day of his baptism into Catholicism, he sent Father Bowden a bunch of altar lilies instead. Wilde did retain a lifelong interest in Catholic theology and liturgy.

While at Magdalen College, Wilde became well known for his role in the aesthetic and decadent movements. He wore his hair long, openly scorned "manly" sports – though he occasionally boxed – and decorated his rooms with peacock feathers, lilies, sunflowers, blue china and other objets d'art. He entertained lavishly and once remarked to some friends, "I find it harder and harder every day to live up to my blue china." The line spread famously; aesthetes adopted it as a slogan, but it was criticised as being terribly vacuous. Some critics disdained the aesthetes, but their languorous attitudes and showy costumes became a recognisable pose. When four of his fellow students physically assaulted Wilde, he fended them off single-handedly, to the surprise of his detractors. By his third year Wilde had truly begun to develop himself and his myth, and considered his learning to be more expansive than what was within the prescribed texts. He was rusticated for one term, after he had returned late to college from a trip to Greece with Mahaffy.

Wilde did not meet Walter Pater until his third year, but had been enthralled by his Studies in the History of the Renaissance, published during Wilde's final year in Trinity. Pater argued that man's sensibility to beauty should be refined above all else, and that each moment should be felt to its fullest extent. Years later, in De Profundis, Wilde described Pater's Studies... as "that book that has had such a strange influence over my life". He learned tracts of the book by heart, and carried it with him on travels in later years. Pater gave Wilde his sense of almost flippant devotion to art, though he gained a purpose for it through the lectures and writings of critic John Ruskin. Ruskin despaired at the self-validating aestheticism of Pater, arguing that the importance of art lies in its potential for the betterment of society. Ruskin admired beauty, but believed it must be allied with, and applied to, moral good. When Wilde eagerly attended Ruskin's lecture series The Aesthetic and Mathematic Schools of Art in Florence, he learned about aesthetics as the non-mathematical elements of painting. Despite being given to neither early rising nor manual labour, Wilde volunteered for Ruskin's project to convert a swampy country lane into a smart road neatly edged with flowers.

Wilde won the 1878 Newdigate Prize for his poem "Ravenna", which reflected on his visit there in the previous year, and he duly read it at Encaenia. In November 1878, he graduated Bachelor of Arts with a double first, having been placed in the first class in Classical Moderations (the first part of the course) and then again in the final examination in Literae Humaniores (Greats). Wilde wrote to a friend, "The dons are 'astonied' beyond words – the Bad Boy doing so well in the end!"

== Apprenticeship of an aesthete: 1880s ==
=== Debut in society ===
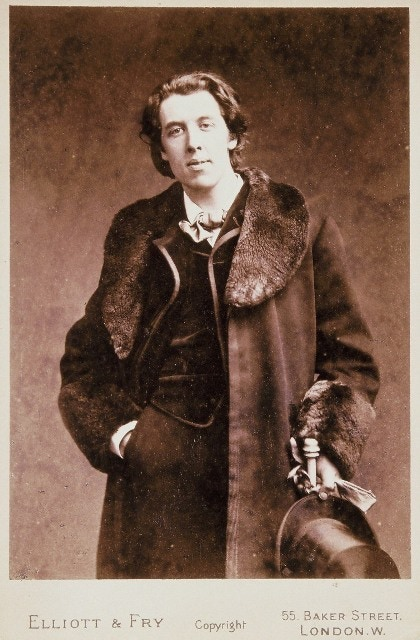
Photograph by Elliott & Fry of Baker Street, London, 1881

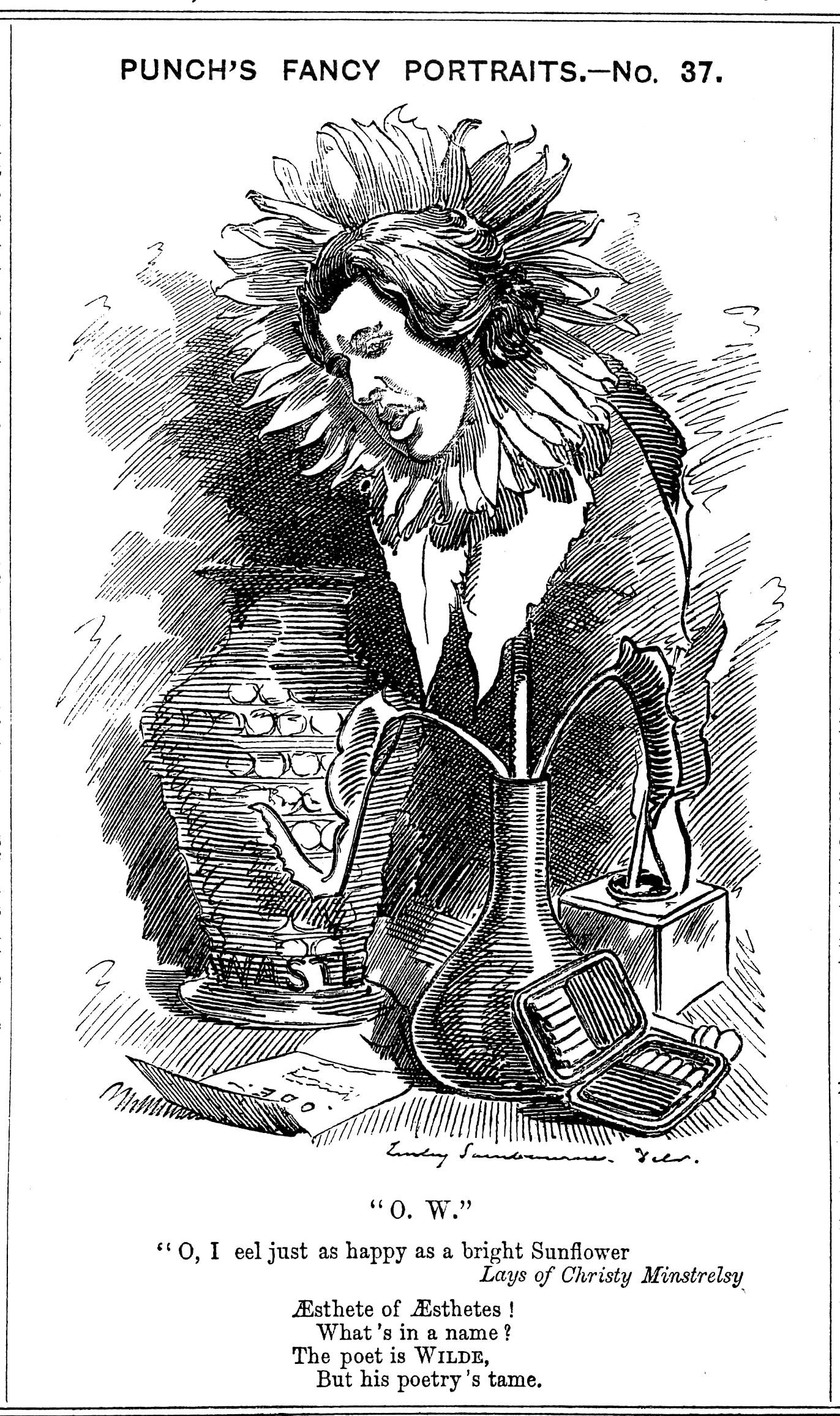
1881 caricature in Punch, the caption reads: "O.W.", "O, I feel just as happy as a bright sunflower!", Lays of Christy Minstrelsy, "Æsthete of Æsthetes!/What's in a name?/The poet is Wilde/But his poetry's tame."

After graduation from Oxford, Wilde returned to Dublin, where he met again Florence Balcombe, a childhood sweetheart. She became engaged to Bram Stoker and they married in 1878. Wilde was disappointed but stoic. He wrote to Balcombe remembering; "the two sweet years – the sweetest years of all my youth" during which they had been close. He also stated his intention to "return to England, probably for good". This he did in 1878, only briefly visiting Ireland twice after that.

Unsure of his next step, Wilde wrote to various acquaintances enquiring about Classics positions at Oxford or Cambridge. The Rise of Historical Criticism was his submission for the Chancellor's Essay prize of 1879, which, though no longer a student, he was still eligible to enter. Its subject, "Historical Criticism among the Ancients" seemed ready-made for Wilde – with both his skill in composition and ancient learning – but he struggled to find his voice in the long, flat, scholarly style. Unusually, no prize was awarded that year. (Note: The essay was later published in "Miscellanies", the final section of the 1908 edition of Wilde's collected works.)

With the last of his inheritance from the sale of his father's houses, he set himself up as a bachelor in London. The 1881 British Census listed Wilde as a boarder at 1 (now 44) Tite Street, Chelsea, where Frank Miles, a society painter, was the head of the household.

Lillie Langtry was introduced to Wilde at Frank Miles' studio in 1877. The most glamorous woman in England, Langtry assumed great importance to Wilde during his early years in London and they remained close friends for many years; he tutored her in Latin and later encouraged her to pursue acting. She wrote in her autobiography that he "possessed a remarkably fascinating and compelling personality", and "the cleverness of his remarks received added value from his manner of delivering them."

Wilde regularly attended the theatre and was especially taken with star actresses such as Ellen Terry and Sarah Bernhardt. In 1880 he completed his first play, Vera; or, The Nihilists, a tragic melodrama about Russian nihilism, and distributed privately printed copies to various actresses whom he hoped to interest in its sole female role. A one-off performance in London was advertised in November 1881 with Mrs. Bernard Beere as Vera, but withdrawn by Wilde for what was claimed to be consideration for political feeling in England.

He had been publishing lyrics and poems in magazines since entering Trinity College, especially in Kottabos and the Dublin University Magazine. In mid-1881, at 27 years old, he published Poems, which collected, revised, and expanded his poems.

Though the book sold out its first print run of 750 copies, it was not generally well received by the critics: Punch, for example, said that "The poet is Wilde, but his poetry's tame". By a tight vote, the Oxford Union condemned the book for alleged plagiarism. The librarian, who had requested the book for the library, returned the presentation copy to Wilde with a note of apology. Biographer Richard Ellmann argues that Wilde's poem "Hélas!" was a sincere, though flamboyant, attempt to explain the dichotomies the poet saw in himself; one line reads: "To drift with every passion till my soul / Is a stringed lute on which all winds can play". The book had further printings in 1882. It was bound in a rich, enamel parchment cover (embossed with gilt blossom) and printed on hand-made Dutch paper; over the next few years, Wilde presented many copies to the dignitaries and writers who received him during his lecture tours.

=== North America: 1882 ===
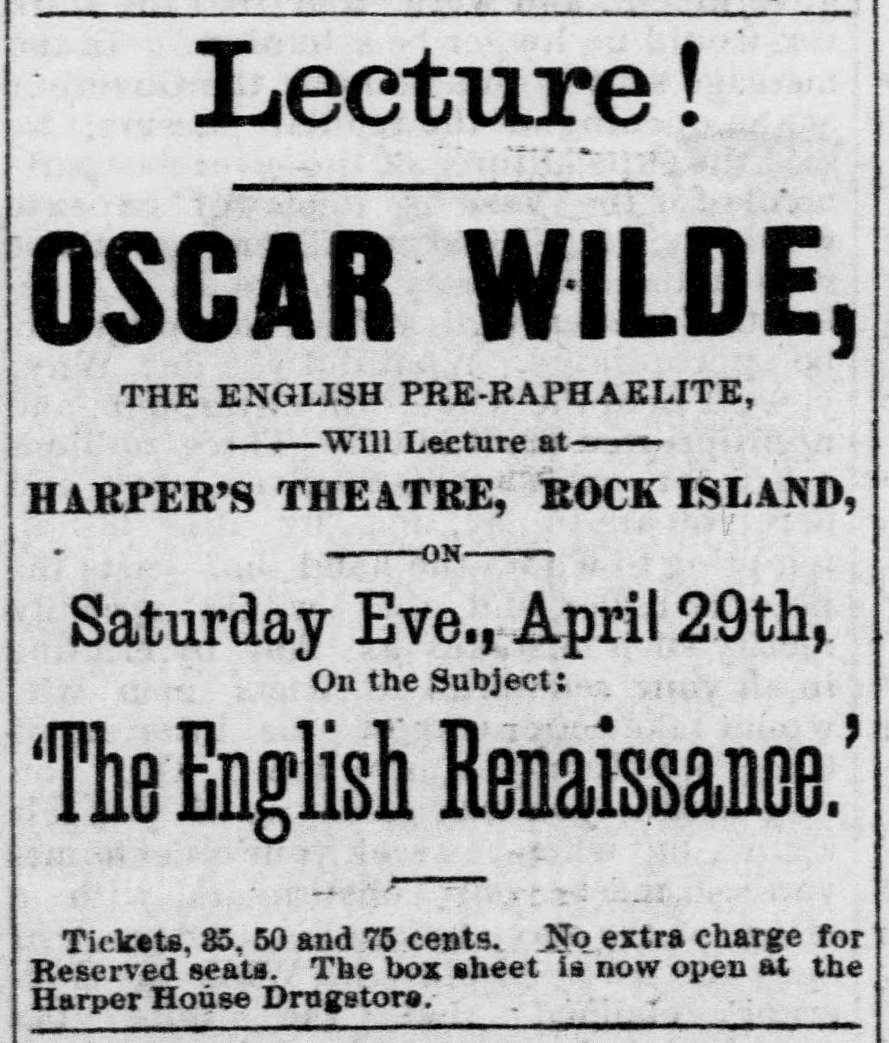
Wilde lectured on "The English Renaissance" in art during his US and Canada tour in 1882.

Aestheticism was sufficiently in vogue to be caricatured by Gilbert and Sullivan in Patience (1881). Richard D'Oyly Carte, an English impresario, invited Wilde to make a lecture tour of North America, simultaneously priming the pump for the US tour of Patience and selling this most charming aesthete to the American public. Wilde journeyed on the SS Arizona, arriving on 2 January 1882 and disembarking the following day. (Note: Wilde reputedly told a customs officer that "I have nothing to declare except my genius", although the first recording of this remark was many years later, and Wilde's best lines were often quoted immediately in the press.) Originally planned to last four months, the tour continued for almost a year owing to its commercial success. Wilde sought to transpose the beauty he saw in art into daily life. This was a practical as well as philosophical project: in Oxford he had surrounded himself with blue china and lilies, and now one of his lectures was on interior design. In a British Library article on aestheticism and decadence, Carolyn Burdett writes,

Wilde teased his readers with the claim that life imitates art rather than the other way round. His point was a serious one: we notice London fogs, he argued, because art and literature has taught us to do so. Wilde, among others, 'performed' these maxims. He presented himself as the impeccably dressed and mannered dandy figure whose life was a work of art.

When asked to explain reports that he had paraded down Piccadilly in London carrying a lily, long hair flowing, Wilde replied, "It's not whether I did it or not that's important, but whether people believed I did it". Wilde believed that the artist should hold forth higher ideals and that pleasure and beauty would replace utilitarian ethics.

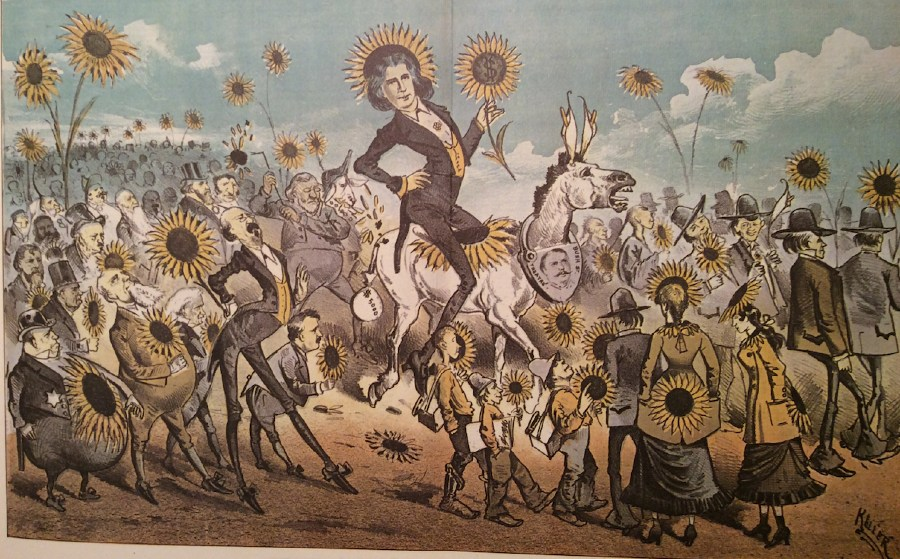
Keller cartoon from the Wasp of San Francisco depicting Wilde on the occasion of his visit there in 1882

Wilde and aestheticism were both mercilessly caricatured and criticised in the press: the Springfield Republican, for instance, commented on Wilde's behaviour during his visit to Boston to lecture on aestheticism, suggesting that Wilde's conduct was more a bid for notoriety rather than devotion to beauty and the aesthetic. Thomas Wentworth Higginson, a cleric and abolitionist, wrote in "Unmanly Manhood" of his general concern that Wilde, "whose only distinction is that he has written a thin volume of very mediocre verse", would improperly influence the behaviour of men and women.

According to biographer Michèle Mendelssohn, Wilde was the subject of anti-Irish caricature and was portrayed as a monkey, a blackface performer and a Christy's Minstrel throughout his career. "Harper's Weekly put a sunflower-worshipping monkey dressed as Wilde on the front of the January 1882 issue. The drawing stimulated other American maligners and, in England, had a full-page reprint in the Lady's Pictorial. ... When the National Republican discussed Wilde, it was to explain 'a few items as to the animal's pedigree.' And on 22 January 1882, the Washington Post illustrated the Wild Man of Borneo alongside Oscar Wilde of England and asked 'How far is it from this to this?'" When he visited San Francisco, the San Francisco Chronicle reported, "The city is divided into two camps, those who thought Wilde was an engaging speaker and an original thinker, and those who thought he was the most pretentious fraud ever perpetrated on a groaning public." Though his press reception was hostile, Wilde was well received in diverse settings across America: he claimed to have drunk whiskey with miners in Leadville, Colorado, and was fêted at the most fashionable salons in many cities he visited.

=== London life and marriage ===
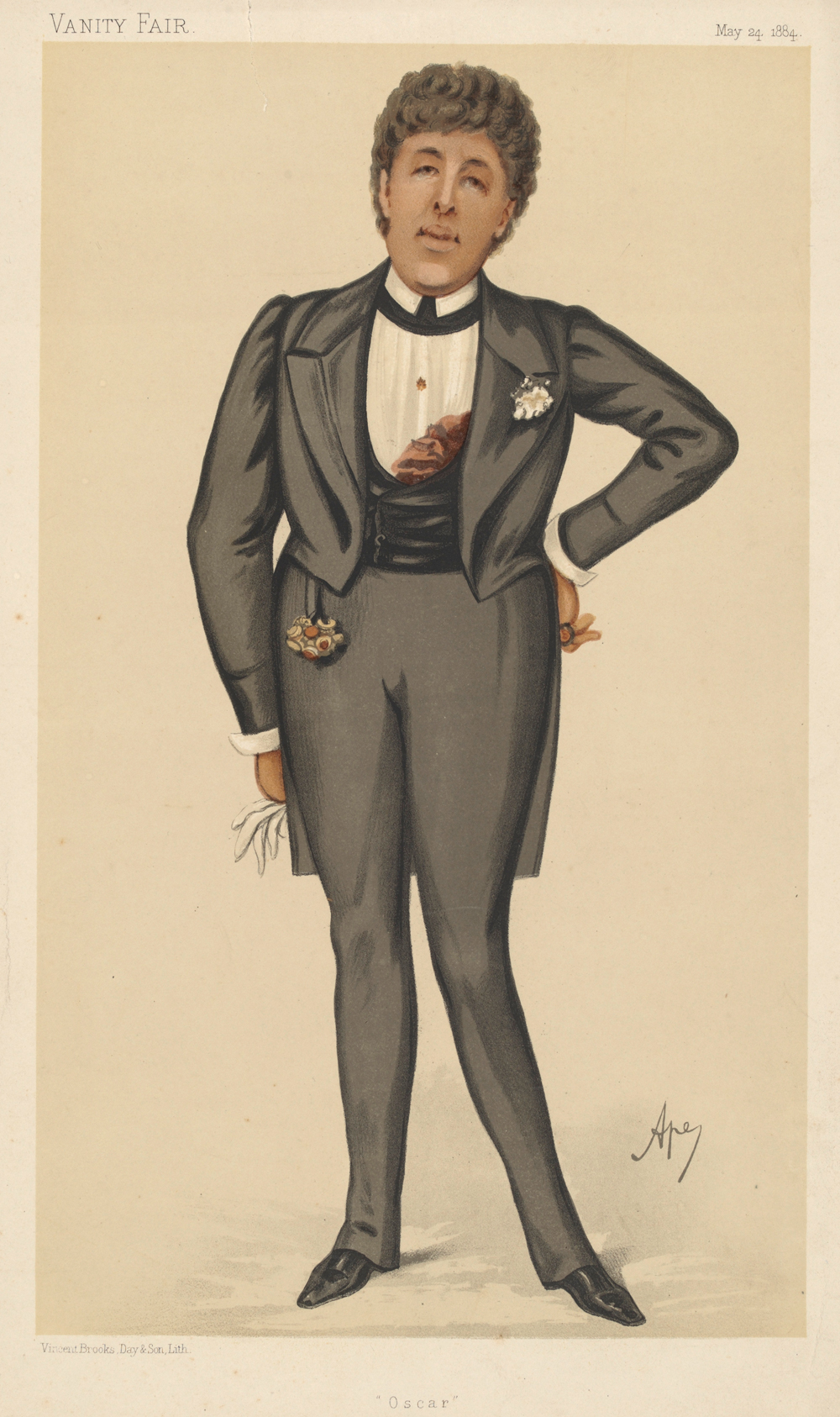
Caricature of Wilde in the London magazine Vanity Fair, 24 April 1884

His lecture earnings, plus money had received for the rights to Vera and The Duchess of Padua, allowed him to move to Paris between February and mid-May 1883. While there he met Robert Sherard, whom he entertained constantly. "We are dining on the Duchess tonight", Wilde would declare before taking him to an expensive restaurant. In August he briefly returned to New York for the production of Vera, the rights of which he had sold to the American actress Marie Prescott. The play was initially well received by the audience, but when the critics wrote negative reviews, attendance fell sharply and the play closed a week after it had opened.

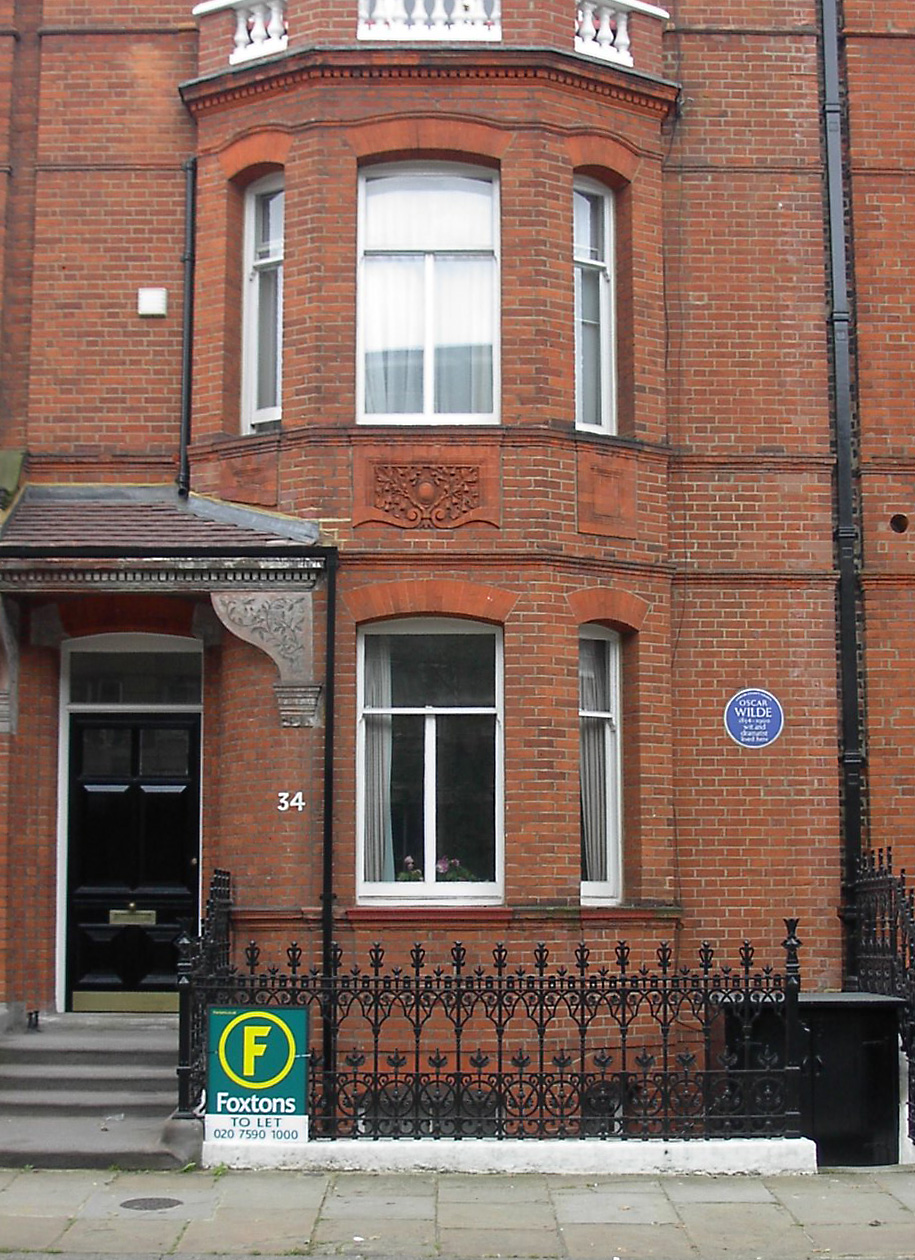
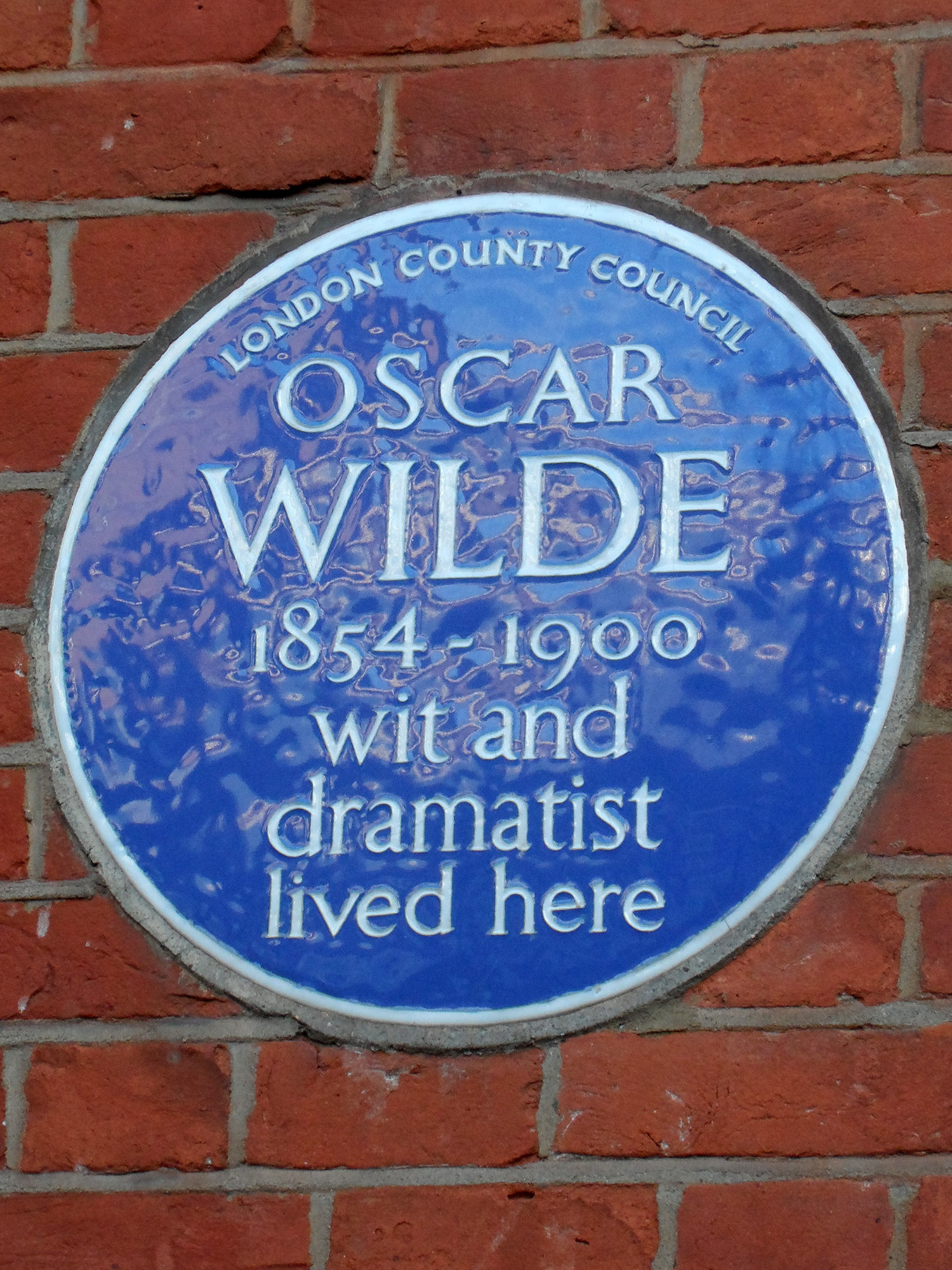
Left: No. 34 Tite Street, Chelsea, the Wilde family home from 1884 to his arrest in 1895. Right: close up of the commemorative blue plaque on the outer wall. In Wilde's time this was No. 16 – the houses have been renumbered.

In London, he had been introduced in 1881 to Constance Lloyd, daughter of Horace Lloyd, a wealthy Queen's Counsel (lawyer). She happened to be visiting Dublin in 1884 when Wilde was lecturing at the Gaiety Theatre. He proposed to her and they married on 29 May 1884 at the Anglican St James's Church, Paddington, in London. Although Constance had an annual allowance of £250, which was generous for a young woman (equivalent to £26,900 in 2025), the Wildes had relatively luxurious tastes. They had preached to others for so long on the subject of design that people expected their home to set new standards.

No 16 Tite Street in Chelsea, west London was duly renovated in seven months at considerable expense. The couple had two sons, Cyril (1885) and Vyvyan (1886). Wilde became the sole literary signatory of George Bernard Shaw's petition for a pardon of the anarchists arrested (and later executed) after the Haymarket massacre in Chicago in 1886.

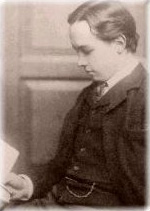
Robert Ross at twenty-four

In 1886, while at Oxford, Wilde met Robert Ross. Ross, who had read Wilde's poems before they met, seemed unrestrained by the Victorian prohibition against homosexuality. By Richard Ellmann's account, he was a precocious seventeen-year-old who "so young and yet so knowing, was determined to seduce Wilde". According to Daniel Mendelsohn, Wilde, who had long alluded to Greek love, was "initiated into homosexual sex" by Ross, while his "marriage had begun to unravel after his wife's second pregnancy, which left him physically repelled".

Wilde had a number of favourite haunts in London. These included the Café Royal in Piccadilly, Hatchards bookstore in Piccadilly, and the department stores Liberty & Co. on Great Marlborough Street and Harrods in Knightsbridge; Wilde was among Harrods' first selected customers who were granted extended credit.

== Prose writing: 1886–1891 ==
=== Journalism and editorship: 1886–1889 ===
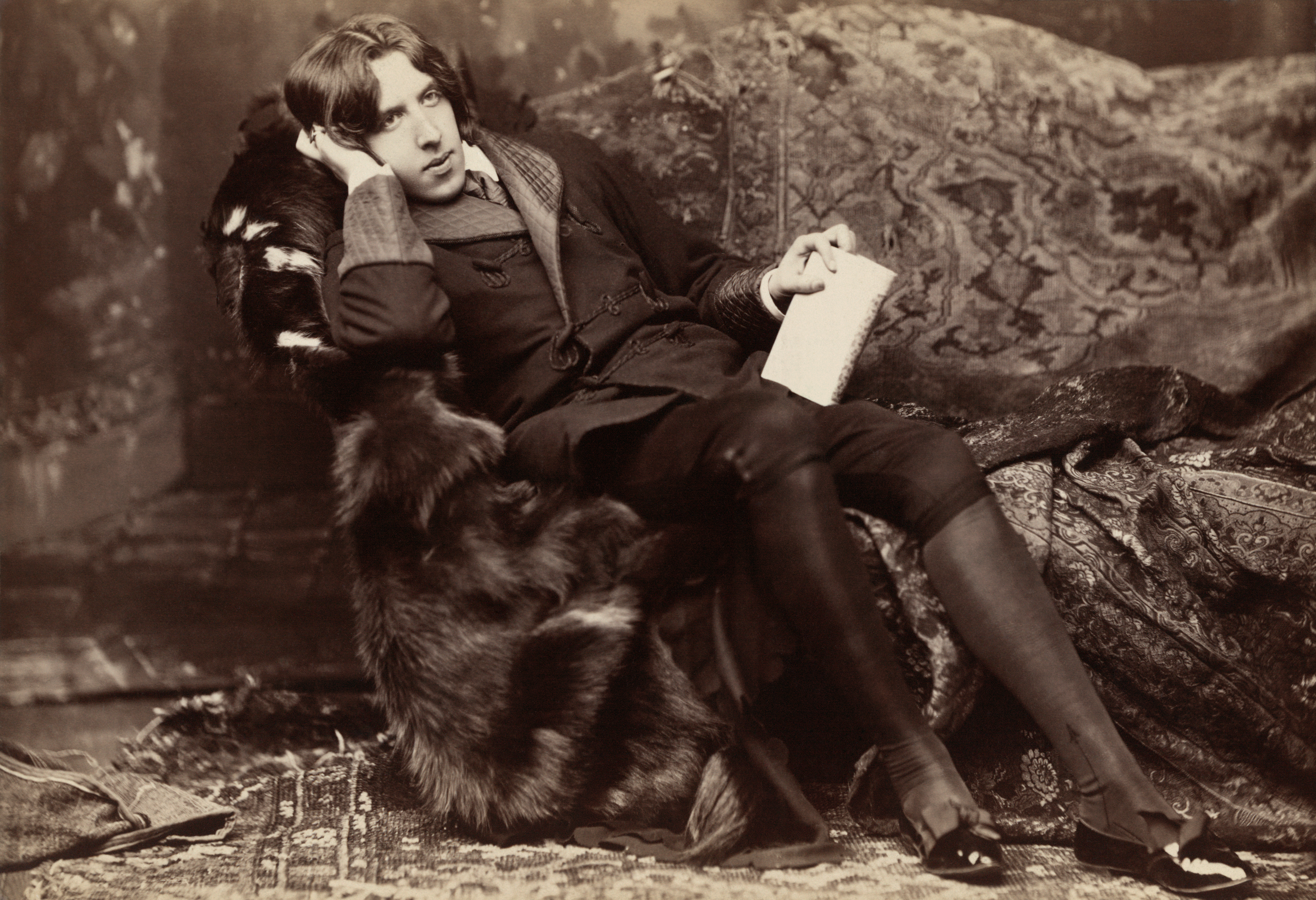
Wilde reclining with Poems, by Napoleon Sarony in New York in 1882. Wilde often liked to appear idle, though in fact he worked hard; by the late 1880s he was a father, an editor and a writer.

Criticism over artistic matters in The Pall Mall Gazette provoked a letter of self-defence, and soon Wilde was a contributor to that and other journals during 1885–87. Although Richard Ellmann has claimed that Wilde enjoyed reviewing, Wilde's wife would tell friends that "Mr Wilde hates journalism". Like his parents before him, Wilde supported Ireland's cause, and when Charles Stewart Parnell was falsely accused of inciting murder, he wrote a series of astute columns defending the politician in the Daily Chronicle.

His flair, having previously been put mainly into socialising, suited journalism and rapidly attracted notice. With his youth nearly over and a family to support, in mid-1887 Wilde became the editor of The Lady's World magazine, his name prominent on the cover. He promptly renamed it as The Woman's World and raised its tone, adding serious articles on parenting, culture and politics, while keeping discussions of fashion and arts. Two pieces of fiction were usually included, one to be read to children, the other for adult readers. Wilde worked hard to solicit good contributions from his wide artistic acquaintance, including those of Lady Wilde and his wife, Constance, while his own "Literary and Other Notes" were themselves popular and amusing.

The initial vigour and excitement which he brought to the job began to fade as administration, commuting and office life became tedious. At the same time as Wilde's interest flagged, the publishers became concerned about circulation: sales, at the relatively high price of one shilling, remained low. Increasingly sending instructions to the magazine by letter, Wilde began a new period of creative work and his own column appeared less regularly. In October 1889, Wilde had finally found his voice in prose and, at the end of the second volume, Wilde left The Woman's World. The magazine outlasted him by only a year. Wilde's period at the helm of the magazine played a pivotal role in his development as a writer and facilitated his ascent to fame. Whilst Wilde the journalist supplied articles under the guidance of his editors, Wilde the editor was forced to learn to manipulate the literary marketplace on his own terms.

During the 1880s, Wilde was a close friend of the artist James McNeill Whistler and they dined together on many occasions. At one of these dinners, Whistler produced a bon mot that Wilde found particularly witty, Wilde exclaimed that he wished that he had said it. Whistler retorted "You will, Oscar, you will." Herbert Vivian – a mutual friend of Wilde and Whistler – attended the dinner and recorded it in his article The Reminiscences of a Short Life, which appeared in The Sun in 1889. The article alleged that Wilde had a habit of passing off other people's witticisms as his own – especially Whistler's. Wilde considered Vivian's article to be a scurrilous betrayal, and it directly caused the broken friendship between Wilde and Whistler. The Reminiscences also caused great acrimony between Wilde and Vivian, Wilde accusing Vivian of "the inaccuracy of an eavesdropper with the method of a blackmailer" and banishing Vivian from his circle. Vivian's allegations did not diminish Wilde's reputation as an epigrammatist. London theatre director Luther Munday recounted some of Wilde's typical quips: Wilde said of Whistler that "he had no enemies but was intensely disliked by his friends", of Hall Caine that "he wrote at the top of his voice", of Rudyard Kipling that "he revealed life by splendid flashes of vulgarity", of Henry James that "he wrote fiction as if it were a painful duty", and of Marion Crawford that "he immolated himself on the altar of local colour".

=== Shorter fiction ===
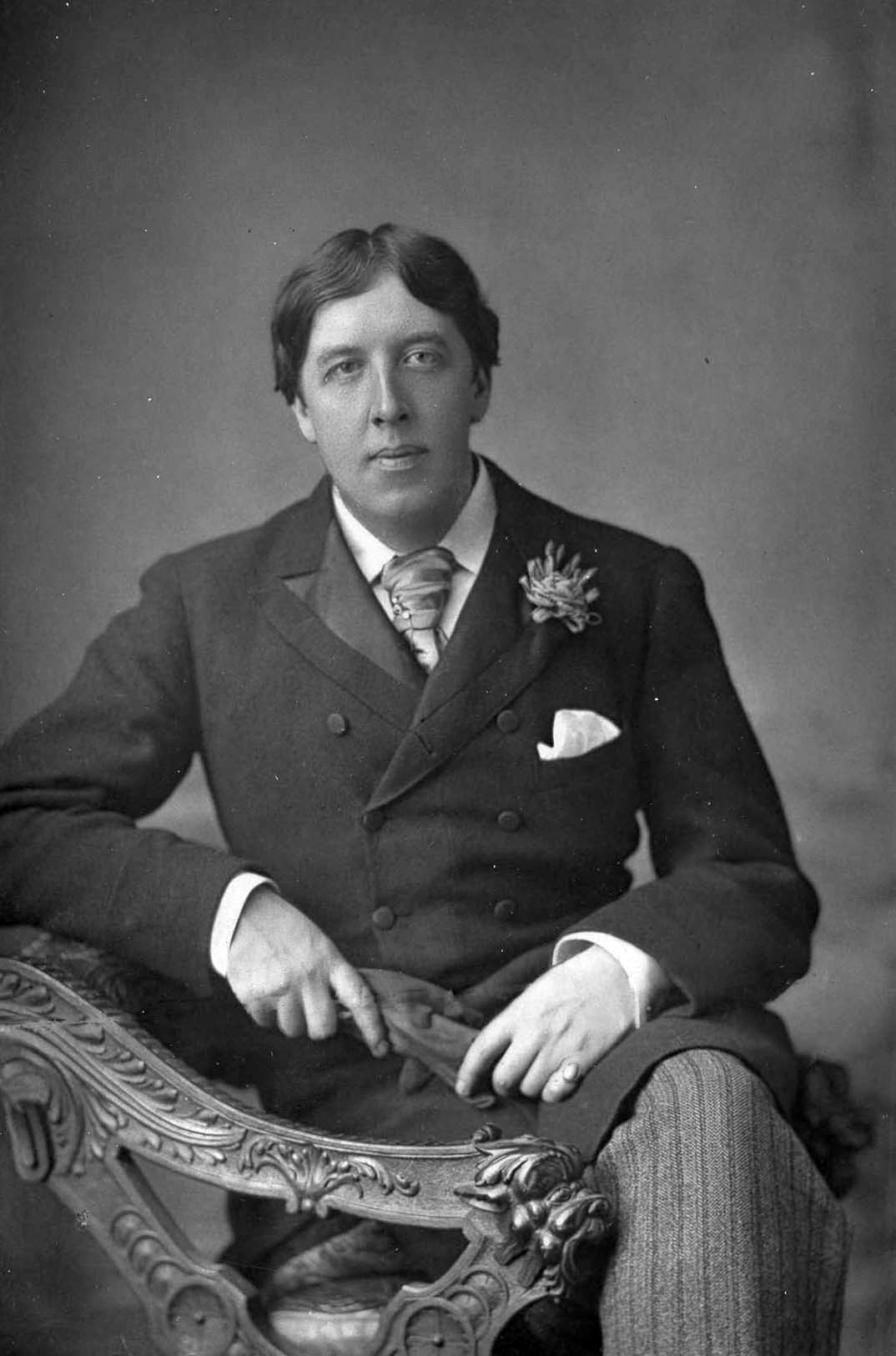
Wilde by W. & D. Downey of Ebury Street, London, 1889

Wilde published The Happy Prince and Other Tales in 1888. In 1891 he published two more collections, Lord Arthur Savile's Crime and Other Stories, and in September A House of Pomegranates was dedicated "To Constance Mary Wilde". "The Portrait of Mr. W. H.", which Wilde had begun in 1887, was first published in Blackwood's Edinburgh Magazine in July 1889. It is a short story which reports a conversation in which the theory that Shakespeare's sonnets were written out of the poet's love of the boy actor "Willie Hughes", is advanced, retracted and then propounded again. The only evidence for this are two supposed puns within the sonnets themselves.

The anonymous narrator is at first sceptical, then believing and finally flirtatious with the reader: he concludes that "there is really a great deal to be said of the Willie Hughes theory of Shakespeare's sonnets." By the end fact and fiction have melded together. Arthur Ransome wrote that Wilde "read something of himself into Shakespeare's sonnets" and became fascinated with the "Willie Hughes theory" despite the lack of biographical evidence for the historical William Hughes' existence. Instead of writing a short but serious essay on the question, Wilde tossed the theory to the three characters of the story, allowing it to unfold as background to the plot – an early masterpiece of Wilde's combining many elements that interested him: conversation, literature and the idea that to shed oneself of an idea one must first convince another of its truth. Ransome concludes that Wilde succeeds precisely because the literary criticism is unveiled with such a deft touch.

Though containing nothing but "special pleading" – it would not, he says "be possible to build an airier castle in Spain than this of the imaginary William Hughes" – we continue listening nonetheless to be charmed by the telling. "You must believe in Willie Hughes," Wilde told an acquaintance, "I almost do, myself."

=== Essays and dialogues ===
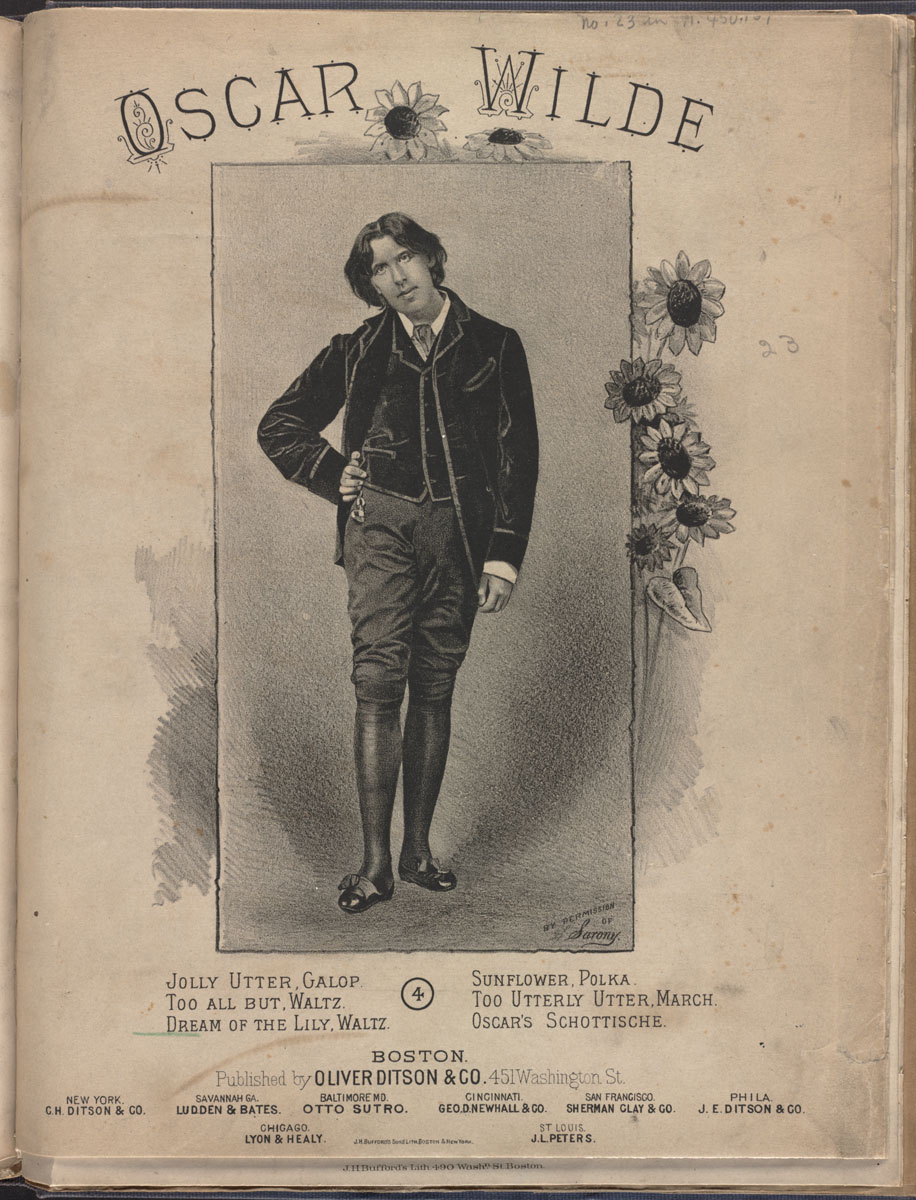
Sheet music cover, 1880s

Wilde, having tired of journalism, had been busy setting out his aesthetic ideas more fully in a series of longer prose pieces which were published in the major literary-intellectual journals of the day. In January 1889, The Decay of Lying: A Dialogue appeared in The Nineteenth Century, and Pen, Pencil and Poison, a satirical biography of Thomas Griffiths Wainewright, in The Fortnightly Review, edited by Wilde's friend Frank Harris. Two of Wilde's four writings on aesthetics are dialogues: though Wilde had evolved professionally from lecturer to writer, he retained an oral tradition of sorts. Having always excelled as a wit and raconteur, he often composed by assembling phrases, bons mots and witticisms into a longer, cohesive work.

Wilde was concerned about the effect of moralising on art; he believed in art's redemptive, developmental powers: "Art is individualism, and individualism is a disturbing and disintegrating force. There lies its immense value. For what it seeks is to disturb monotony of type, slavery of custom, tyranny of habit, and the reduction of man to the level of a machine." In his only political text, The Soul of Man Under Socialism, he argued political conditions should establish this primacy – private property should be abolished and cooperation should be substituted for competition. He wrote "Socialism, Communism, or whatever one chooses to call it, by converting private property into public wealth, and substituting co-operation for competition, will restore society to its proper condition of a thoroughly healthy organism, and insure the material well-being of each member of the community. It will, in fact, give Life its proper basis and its proper environment". At the same time, he stressed that the government most amenable to artists was no government at all. Wilde envisioned a society where mechanisation has freed human effort from the burden of necessity, effort which can instead be expended on artistic creation. George Orwell summarised, "In effect, the world will be populated by artists, each striving after perfection in the way that seems best to him."

This point of view did not align him with the Fabians, intellectual socialists who advocated using state apparatus to change social conditions, nor did it endear him to the monied classes whom he had previously entertained. Hesketh Pearson, introducing a collection of Wilde's essays in 1950, remarked how The Soul of Man Under Socialism had been an inspirational text for revolutionaries in Tsarist Russia but laments that in the Stalinist era "it is doubtful whether there are any uninspected places in which it could now be hidden".

Man is least himself when he talks in his own person. Give him a mask, and he will tell you the truth.

— From "The Critic as Artist" published in Intentions (1891)

Wilde considered including this pamphlet and "The Portrait of Mr. W. H.", his essay-story on Shakespeare's sonnets, in a new anthology in 1891, but eventually decided to limit it to purely aesthetic subjects. Intentions packaged revisions of four essays: The Decay of Lying; Pen, Pencil and Poison; The Truth of Masks (first published 1885); and The Critic as Artist in two parts. For Pearson the biographer, the essays and dialogues exhibit every aspect of Wilde's genius and character: wit, romancer, talker, lecturer, humanist and scholar and concludes that "no other productions of his have as varied an appeal". 1891 turned out to be Wilde's annus mirabilis; apart from his three collections he also produced his only novel.

=== The Picture of Dorian Gray ===
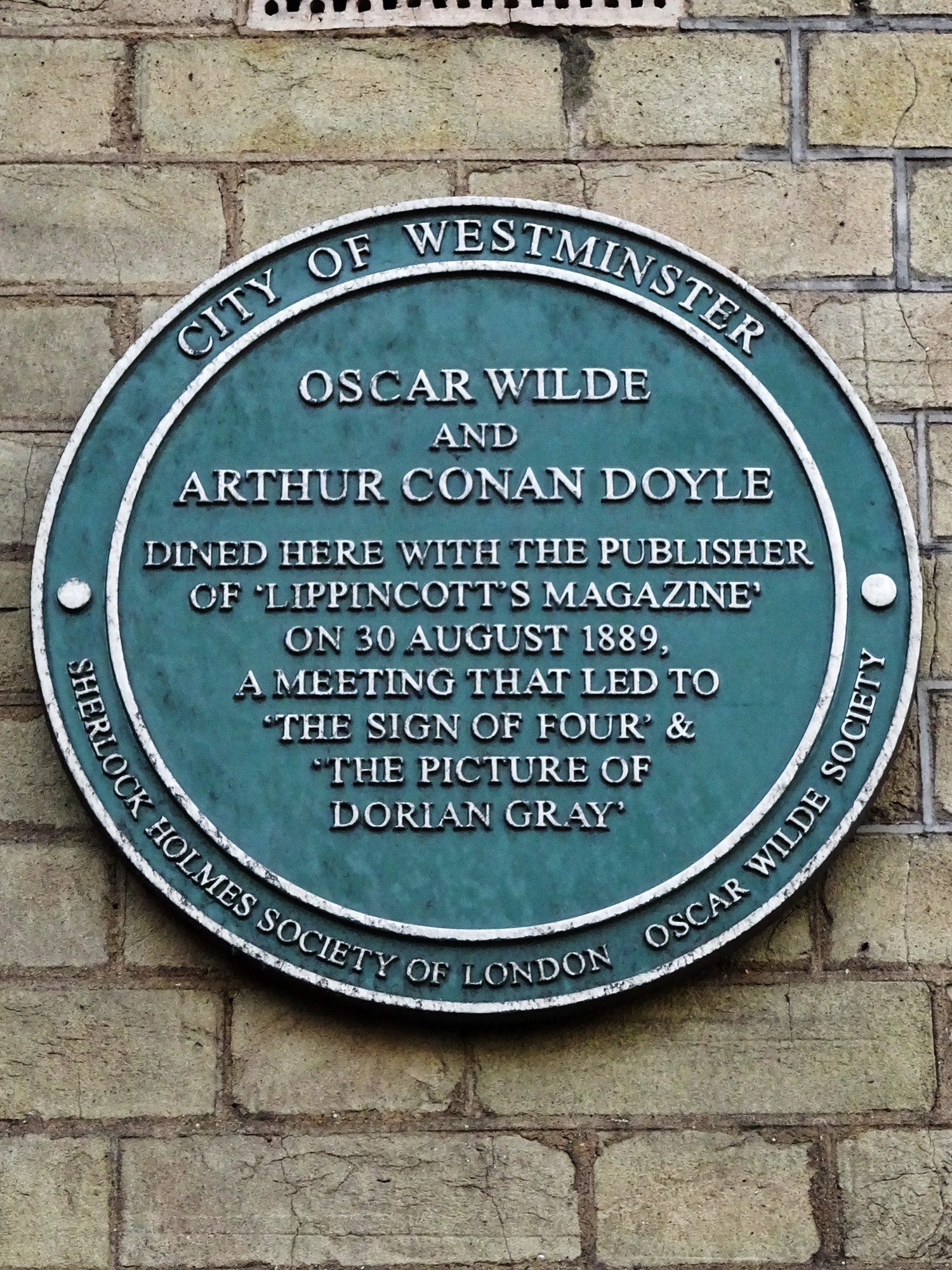
Plaque commemorating the dinner between Wilde, Arthur Conan Doyle and the publisher of Lippincott's Monthly Magazine on 30 August 1889 at the Langham Hotel, London, that led to Wilde writing The Picture of Dorian Gray

The first version of The Picture of Dorian Gray was published as the lead story in the July 1890 edition of Lippincott's Monthly Magazine, along with five others. The story begins with an artist painting a picture of Gray. When Gray, who has a "face like ivory and rose leaves", sees his finished portrait, he breaks down. Distraught that his beauty will fade while the portrait stays beautiful, he inadvertently makes a Faustian bargain in which only the painted image grows old while he stays beautiful and young. For Wilde, the purpose of art would be to guide life as if beauty alone were its object. As Gray's portrait allows him to escape the corporeal ravages of his hedonism, Wilde sought to juxtapose the beauty he saw in art with daily life.

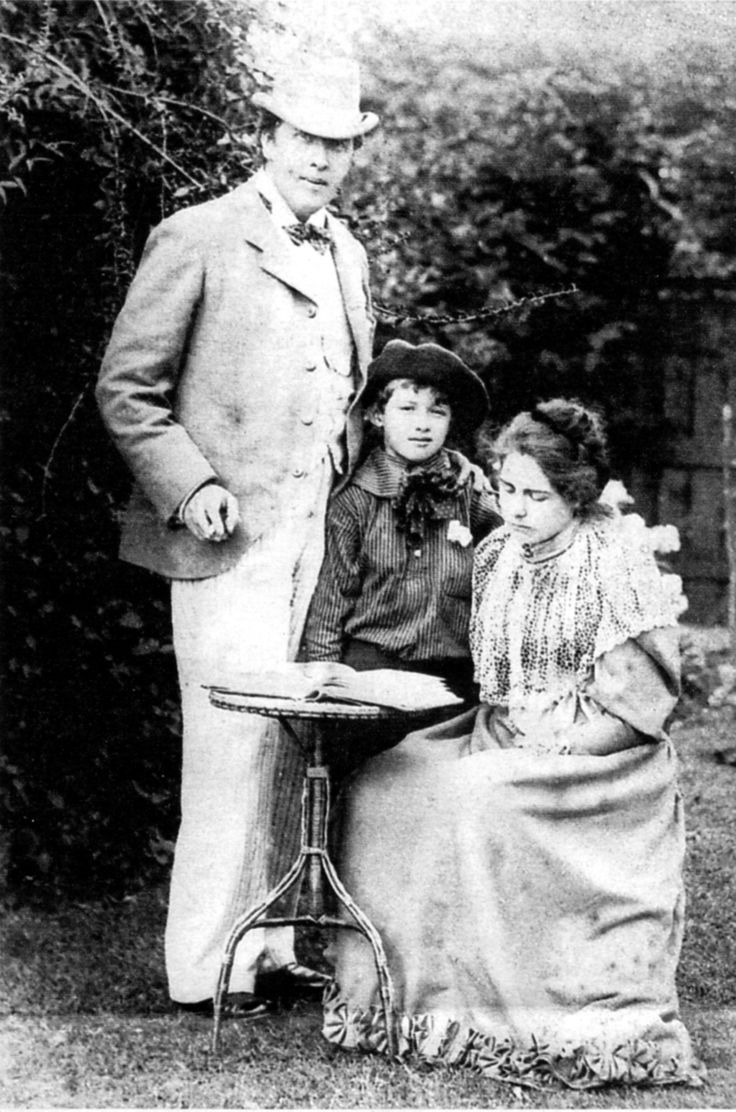
Oscar, Cyril and Constance Wilde during their summer holiday in Felbrigg, southwest of Cromer, Norfolk in 1892

Reviewers immediately criticised the novel's decadence and homosexual subtext; the Daily Chronicle for example, called it "unclean", "poisonous" and "heavy with the mephitic odours of moral and spiritual putrefaction". Wilde vigorously responded, writing to the editor of the Scots Observer, in which he clarified his stance on ethics and aesthetics in art – "If a work of art is rich and vital and complete, those who have artistic instincts will see its beauty and those to whom ethics appeal more strongly will see its moral lesson." He nevertheless revised it extensively for book publication in 1891: six new chapters were added, some overtly decadent passages and homo-eroticism excised, and a preface was included consisting of twenty-two epigrams, such as "Books are well written, or badly written. That is all."

Contemporary reviewers and modern critics have postulated numerous possible sources of the story, a search Jershua McCormack argues is futile because Wilde "has tapped a root of Western folklore so deep and ubiquitous that the story has escaped its origins and returned to the oral tradition". Wilde claimed the plot was "an idea that is as old as the history of literature but to which I have given a new form". Modern critic Robin McKie considered the novel to be technically mediocre, saying that the conceit of the plot had guaranteed its fame, but the device is never pushed to its full. On the other hand, Robert McCrum of The Guardian lists it among the 100 best novels ever written in English, calling it "an arresting, and slightly camp, exercise in late-Victorian gothic". The novel has been the subject of many adaptations to film and stage, and one of its most quoted lines, "there is only one thing in the world worse than being talked about, and that is not being talked about", features in Monty Python's "Oscar Wilde sketch" in an episode of Monty Python's Flying Circus.

The original typescript submitted to Lippincott's Monthly Magazine, now housed at UCLA, had been largely forgotten except by professional Wilde scholars until the 2011 publication of The Picture of Dorian Gray: An Annotated, Uncensored Edition by the Belknap Press.

== Theatrical career: 1892–1895 ==
=== Salomé ===
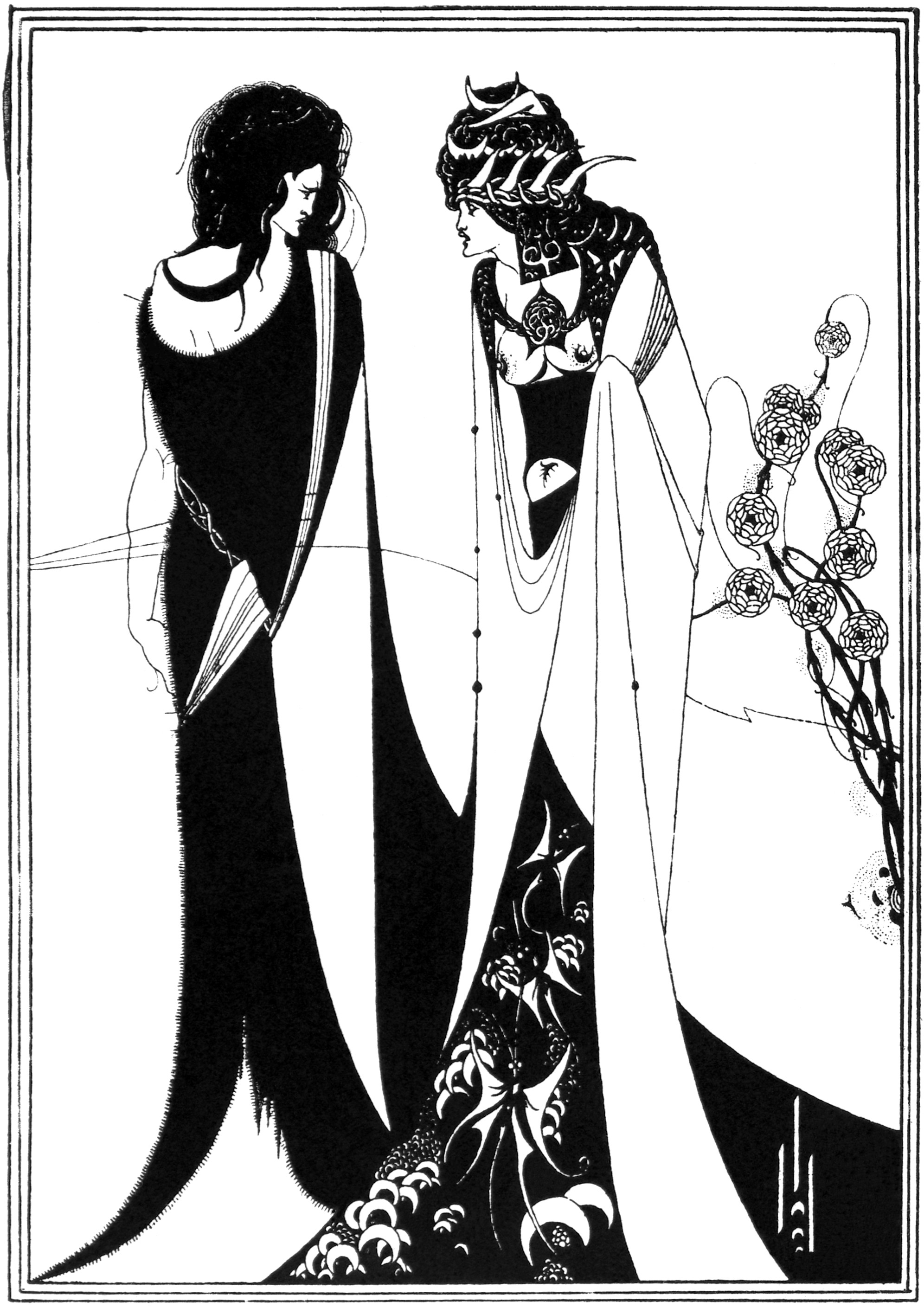
A stylistically androgynous Jokanaan, with Salome. Illustration by Aubrey Beardsley for the 1894 English edition of Salome

The 1891 census records the Wildes' residence at 16 Tite Street, (now 34) where Oscar lived with his wife Constance and two sons. Not content with being better known than ever in London, though, he returned to Paris in October 1891, this time as a respected writer. He was received at the salons littéraires, including the famous mardis of Stéphane Mallarmé, a renowned symbolist poet of the time. Wilde's two plays during the 1880s, Vera; or, The Nihilists and The Duchess of Padua, had not met with much success. He had continued his interest in the theatre and now, after finding his voice in prose, his thoughts turned again to the dramatic form as the biblical iconography of Salome filled his mind. One evening, after discussing depictions of Salome throughout history, he returned to his hotel and noticed a blank copybook lying on the desk, and it occurred to him to write in it what he had been saying. The result was a new play, Salomé, written rapidly and in French.

A tragedy, it tells the story of Salome, the stepdaughter of the tetrarch Herod Antipas, who, to her stepfather's dismay but mother's delight, requests the head of Jokanaan (John the Baptist) on a silver platter as a reward for dancing the Dance of the Seven Veils. When Wilde returned to London just before Christmas the Paris Echo referred to him as "le great event" of the season. Rehearsals of the play, starring Sarah Bernhardt, began but the play was refused a licence by the Lord Chamberlain since it depicted biblical characters. Salome was published jointly in Paris and London in 1893 in the original French, and in London a year later in Lord Alfred Douglas's English translation with illustrations by Aubrey Beardsley, though it was not performed until 1896 in Paris, during Wilde's incarceration.

=== Comedies of society ===
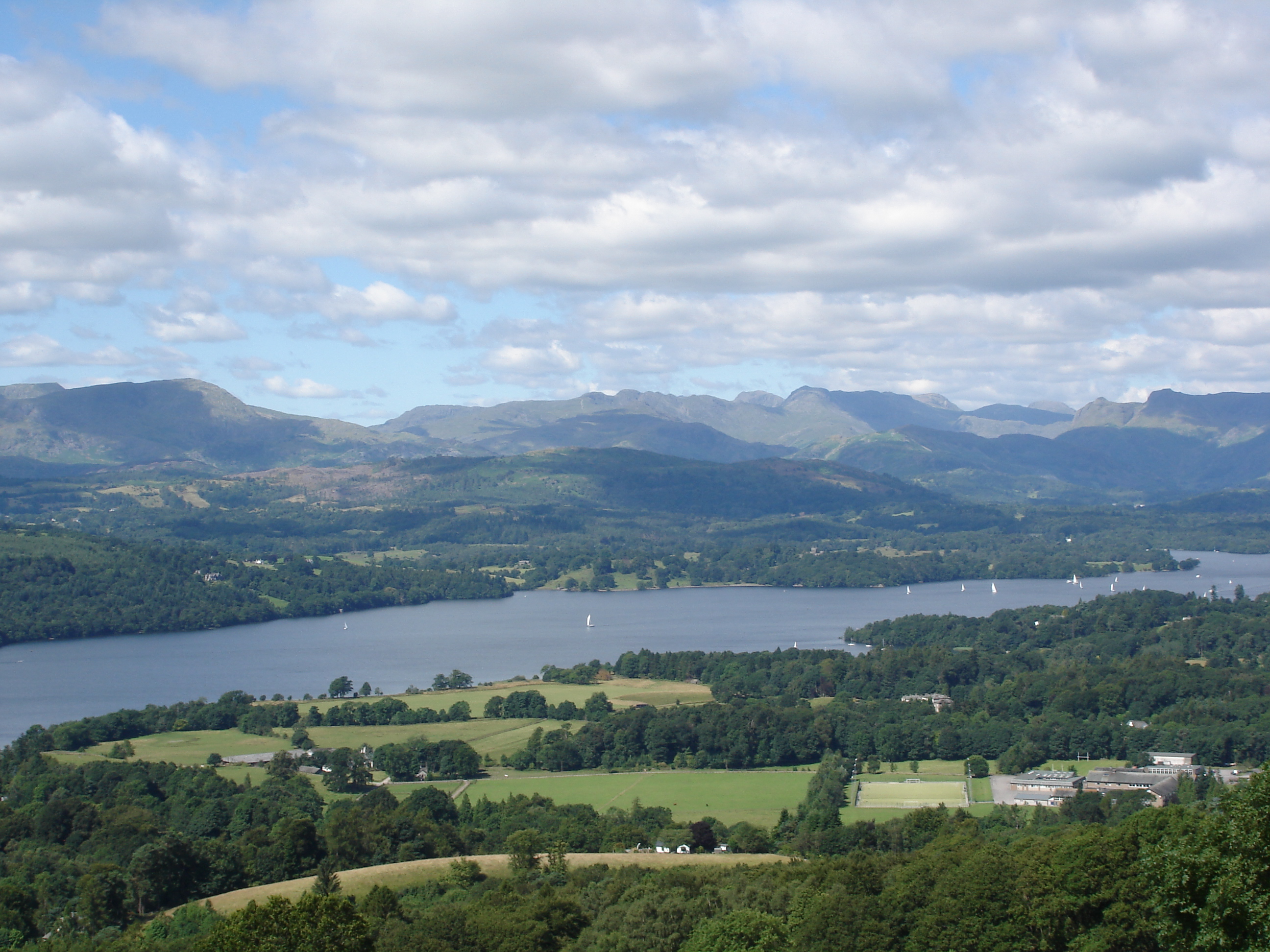
Lake Windermere in northern England where Wilde began working on his first hit play, Lady Windermere's Fan (1892), during a summer visit in 1891

Wilde, who had first set out to irritate Victorian society with his dress and talking points, then to outrage it with Dorian Gray, his novel of vice hidden beneath art, finally found a way to critique society on its own terms. Lady Windermere's Fan was first performed on 20 February 1892 at St James's Theatre, packed with the cream of society. On the surface a witty comedy, there is subtle subversion underneath: "it concludes with collusive concealment rather than collective disclosure". The audience, like Lady Windermere, are forced to soften harsh social codes in favour of a more nuanced view. The play was enormously popular, touring the country for months, but largely trashed by conservative critics. The success of the play saw Wilde earn £7,000 in the first year alone (equivalent to £769,000 in 2025).

His first hit play was followed by A Woman of No Importance in 1893, another Victorian comedy, revolving around the spectre of illegitimate births, mistaken identities and late revelations. Wilde was commissioned to write two more plays and An Ideal Husband, written in 1894, followed in January 1895.

Peter Raby said these essentially English plays were well-pitched: "Wilde, with one eye on the dramatic genius of Ibsen, and the other on the commercial competition in London's West End, targeted his audience with adroit precision".

=== Queensberry family ===
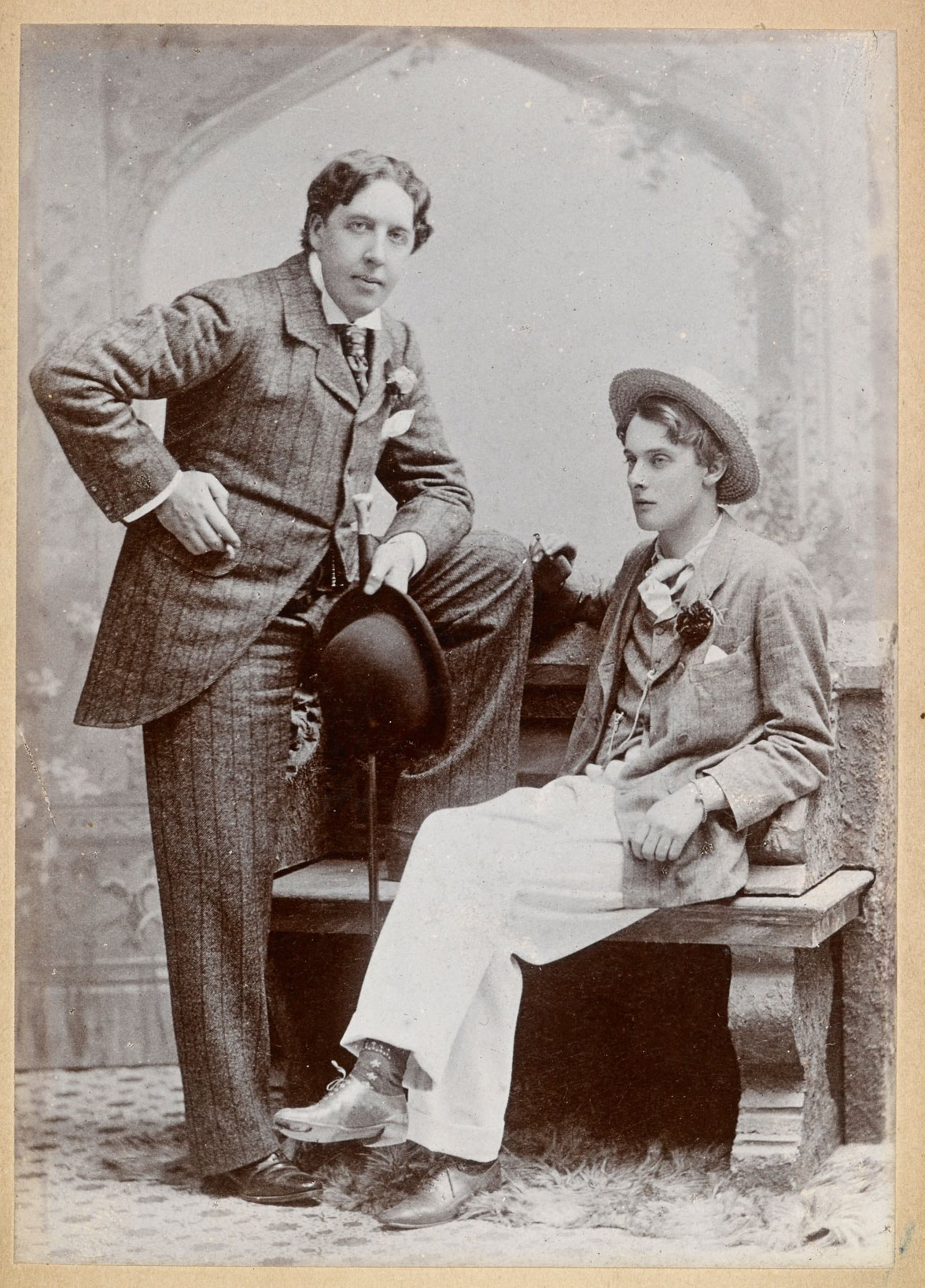
Wilde and Lord Alfred Douglas in 1893

In mid-1891, Lionel Johnson introduced Wilde to Lord Alfred Douglas, Johnson's friend, who was at the time an undergraduate at Oxford. Known to his family and friends as "Bosie", he was a handsome and spoilt young man. An intimate friendship sprang up between Wilde and Douglas and by 1893 Wilde was infatuated with Douglas and they consorted together regularly in a tempestuous affair. If Wilde was relatively indiscreet, even flamboyant, in the way he acted, Douglas was reckless in public. Wilde, who was earning up to £100 a week from his plays (his salary at The Woman's World had been £6), indulged Douglas's every whim: material, artistic, or sexual.

Douglas soon initiated Wilde into the Victorian underground of male prostitution, and Wilde was introduced to a series of young working-class male prostitutes from 1892 onwards by Alfred Taylor. These infrequent rendezvous usually took the same form: Wilde would meet the boy, offer him gifts, dine him privately and then take him to a hotel room. Unlike Wilde's idealised relations with Ross, John Gray and Douglas, all of whom remained part of his aesthetic circle, these consorts were uneducated and knew nothing of literature. Soon his public and private lives had become sharply divided; in De Profundis he wrote to Douglas that "It was like feasting with panthers; the danger was half the excitement ... I did not know that when they were to strike at me it was to be at another's piping and at another's pay."

Douglas and some Oxford friends founded a journal, The Chameleon, to which Wilde "sent a page of paradoxes originally destined for the Saturday Review". "Phrases and Philosophies for the Use of the Young" was to come under attack six months later at Wilde's trial, where he was forced to defend the magazine to which he had sent his work. In any case, it became unique: The Chameleon was not published again.

Lord Alfred's father, the Marquess of Queensberry, was known for his outspoken atheism, brutish manner and creation of the modern rules of boxing. (Note: Queensberry's oldest son, Francis Douglas, Viscount Drumlanrig, possibly had an intimate association with Archibald Philip Primrose, 5th Earl of Rosebery, the Prime Minister to whom he was private secretary, which ended with Drumlanrig's death in an unexplained shooting accident. In any case the Marquess of Queensberry came to believe his sons had been corrupted by older homosexuals or, as he phrased it in a letter in the aftermath of Drumlanrig's death: "Montgomerys, The Snob Queers like Rosebery and certainly Christian Hypocrite like Gladstone and the whole lot of you".) Queensberry, who feuded regularly with his son, confronted Wilde and Lord Alfred about the nature of their relationship several times, but Wilde was able to mollify him. In June 1894, he called on Wilde at 16 Tite Street, without an appointment, and clarified his stance: "I do not say that you are it, but you look it, and pose at it, which is just as bad. And if I catch you and my son again in any public restaurant I will thrash you", to which Wilde responded: "I don't know what the Queensberry rules are, but the Oscar Wilde rule is to shoot on sight". His account in De Profundis was less triumphant: "It was when, in my library at Tite Street, waving his small hands in the air in epileptic fury, your father ... stood uttering every foul word his foul mind could think of, and screaming the loathsome threats he afterwards with such cunning carried out". Queensberry only described the scene once, saying Wilde had "shown him the white feather", meaning he had acted in a cowardly way. Though trying to remain calm, Wilde saw that he was becoming ensnared in a brutal family quarrel. He did not wish to bear Queensberry's insults, but he knew that confronting him could lead to disaster were his liaisons disclosed publicly.

=== The Importance of Being Earnest ===
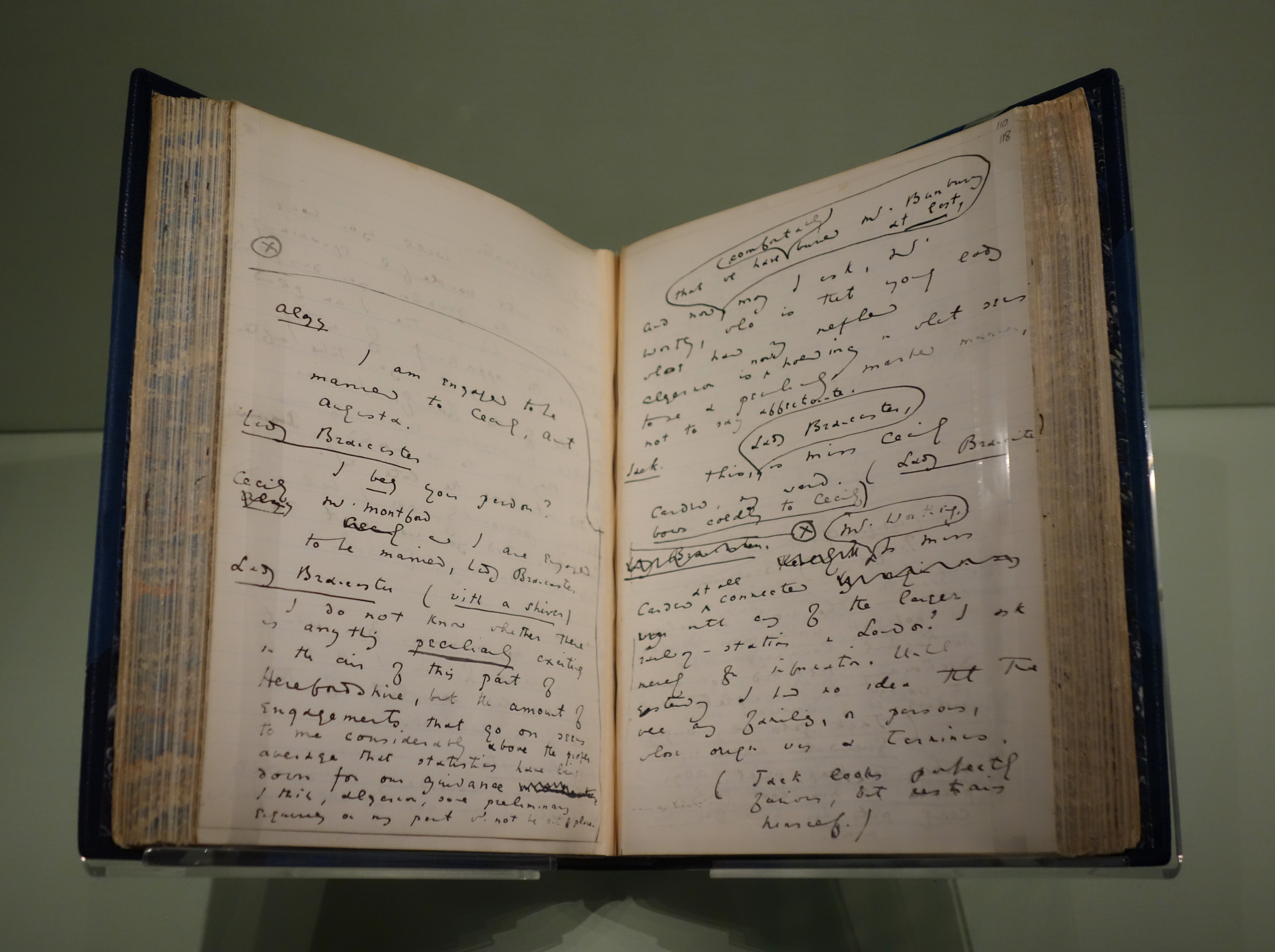
Handwritten draft of The Importance of Being Earnest, on display in the British Library

Wilde's final play again returns to the theme of switched identities: the play's two protagonists engage in "bunburying" (the maintenance of alternative personas in the town and country) which allows them to escape Victorian social mores. The Importance of Being Earnest is even lighter in tone than Wilde's earlier comedies. While their characters often rise to serious themes in moments of crisis, Earnest lacks the by-now-stock Wildean characters: there is no "woman with a past", the principals are neither villainous nor cunning, simply idle cultivés, and the idealistic young women are not that innocent. Mostly set in drawing rooms and almost completely lacking in action or violence, Earnest lacks the self-conscious decadence found in The Picture of Dorian Gray and Salome.

St James's Theatre, London in the 1890s. The Importance of Being Earnest was Wilde's fourth West End hit in three years.

The play, now considered Wilde's masterpiece, was rapidly written in Wilde's artistic maturity in late 1894. It was first performed on 14 February 1895, at St James's Theatre in London, Wilde's second collaboration with George Alexander, the actor-manager. Both author and producer assiduously revised, prepared and rehearsed every line, scene and setting in the months before the premiere, creating a carefully constructed representation of late-Victorian society, yet simultaneously mocking it. During rehearsal Alexander requested that Wilde shorten the play from four acts to three, which the author did. Premieres at St James's seemed like "brilliant parties", and the opening of The Importance of Being Earnest was no exception. Allan Aynesworth (who played Algernon) recalled to Hesketh Pearson, "In my fifty-three years of acting, I never remember a greater triumph than [that] first night." Earnest's immediate reception as Wilde's best work to date finally crystallised his fame into a solid artistic reputation. In a review of the play for The Pall Mall Gazette H. G. Wells wrote, "More humorous dealing with theatrical conventions it would be difficult to imagine. Mr Oscar Wilde has decorated a humour that is Gilbertian with innumerable spangles of that wit that is all his own". The Importance of Being Earnest remains his most popular play.

Wilde's professional success was mirrored by an escalation in his feud with Queensberry. Queensberry had planned to insult Wilde publicly by throwing a bouquet of rotting vegetables onto the stage; Wilde was tipped off and had Queensberry barred from entering the theatre. Fifteen weeks later Wilde was in prison.

== Trials ==
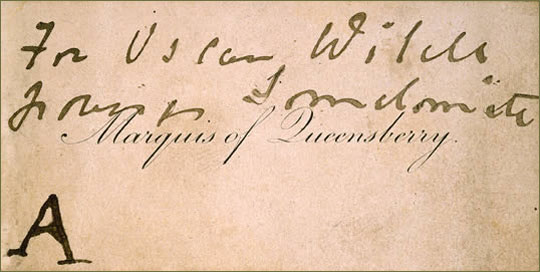
The Marquess of Queensberry's calling card with the handwritten offending inscription "For Oscar Wilde posing Somdomite [sic]". The card was marked as exhibit 'A' in Wilde's libel action.

=== Wilde v Queensberry ===
On 18 February 1895, the Marquess of Queensberry left his calling card at Wilde's club, the Albemarle, inscribed: "For Oscar Wilde, posing somdomite [sic]". (Note: Queensberry's handwriting was almost indecipherable: The hall porter initially read "ponce and sodomite", but Queensberry himself claimed that he'd written "posing 'as' a sodomite", an easier accusation to defend in court. Merlin Holland concludes that "what Queensberry almost certainly wrote was "posing somdomite [sic]".) Wilde, encouraged by Douglas and against the advice of his friends, initiated a private prosecution against Queensberry for defamatory libel, since the note amounted to a public accusation that Wilde had committed the crime of sodomy.

Queensberry was arrested for criminal libel, a charge carrying a possible sentence of up to two years in prison. Under the Libel Act 1843, Queensberry could avoid conviction for libel only by demonstrating that his accusation was in fact true, and furthermore that there was some "public benefit" to having made the accusation openly. Queensberry's lawyers thus hired private detectives to find evidence of Wilde's homosexual liaisons.

Wilde's friends had advised him against the prosecution at a Saturday Review meeting at the Café Royal on 24 March 1895; Frank Harris warned him that "they are going to prove sodomy against you" and advised him to flee to France. Wilde and Douglas walked out in a huff, Wilde saying "it is at such moments as these that one sees who are one's true friends". The scene was witnessed by George Bernard Shaw who recalled it to Arthur Ransome a day or so before Ransome's trial for libelling Douglas in 1913. To Ransome it confirmed what he had said in his 1912 book on Wilde: that Douglas's rivalry for Wilde with Robbie Ross and his arguments with his father had resulted in Wilde's public disaster, as Wilde wrote in De Profundis. Douglas lost his case. Shaw included an account of the argument between Harris, Douglas and Wilde in the preface to his play The Dark Lady of the Sonnets.

The libel trial became a cause célèbre as salacious details of Wilde's private life with Taylor and Douglas began to appear in the press. A team of private detectives had directed Queensberry's lawyers, led by Edward Carson QC, to the world of the Victorian underground. Wilde's association with blackmailers and male prostitutes, cross-dressers and homosexual brothels was recorded, and various persons involved were interviewed, some being coerced to appear as witnesses since they too were accomplices to the crimes of which Wilde was accused.

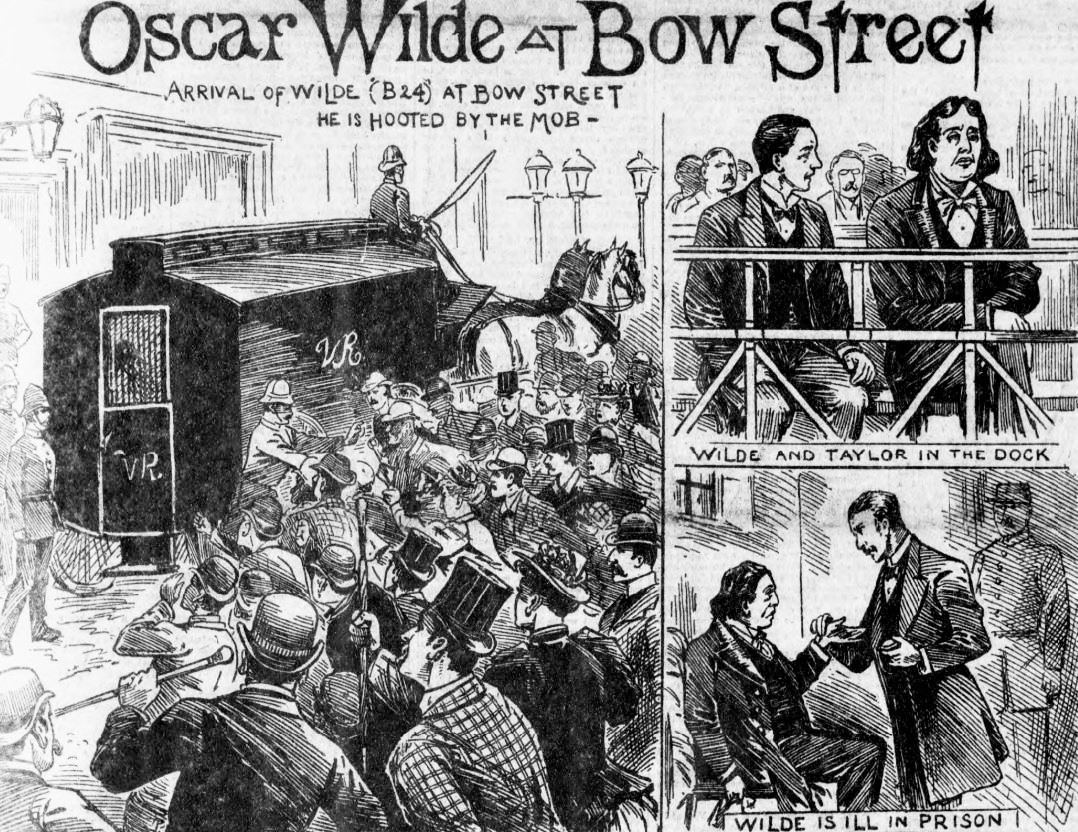
Wilde arriving at Bow Street Magistrates' Court (left) and in the dock (top right), from The Illustrated Police News, April 1895

Wilde's preliminary hearing took place at Bow Street Magistrates' Court. The trial, which captivated Victorian society, opened at the Old Bailey in central London on 3 April 1895 before Mr. Justice Richard Henn Collins, a fellow Dubliner, amid scenes of near hysteria both in the press and the public galleries. The extent of the evidence massed against Wilde forced him to declare meekly, "I am the prosecutor in this case". Wilde's barrister, Sir Edward Clarke, opened the case by pre-emptively asking Wilde about two suggestive letters Wilde had written to Douglas, which the defence had in its possession. He characterised the first as a "prose sonnet" and admitted that the "poetical language" might seem strange to the court but claimed its intent was innocent. Wilde stated that the letters had been obtained by blackmailers who had attempted to extort money from him, but he had refused, suggesting they should take the £60 (equivalent to £6,800 in 2025) offered, "unusual for a prose piece of that length". He claimed to regard the letters as works of art rather than something of which to be ashamed.

Carson, who was also a Dubliner who had attended Trinity College Dublin, at the same time as Wilde, cross-examined Wilde on how he perceived the moral content of his works. Wilde replied with characteristic wit and flippancy, claiming that works of art are not capable of being moral or immoral but only well or poorly made, and that only "brutes and illiterates", whose views on art "are incalculably stupid", would make such judgements about art. Carson, a leading barrister, diverged from the normal practice of asking closed questions. Carson pressed Wilde on each topic from every angle, squeezing out nuances of meaning from Wilde's answers, removing them from their aesthetic context and portraying Wilde as evasive and decadent. While Wilde won the most laughs, Carson scored the most legal points. To undermine Wilde's credibility, and to justify Queensberry's description of Wilde as a "posing somdomite", Carson drew from the witness an admission of his capacity for "posing", by demonstrating that he had lied about his age under oath. (Note: Wilde, age forty, had earlier stated he was thirty-nine years old at the beginning of his direct examination by Clarke. When pressed about the lie by Carson, Wilde flippantly replied: "I have no wish to pose as being young. I am thirty-nine or forty. You have my certificate and that settles the matter.") Playing on this, he returned to the topic throughout his cross-examination. Carson also tried to justify Queensberry's characterisation by quoting from Wilde's novel, The Picture of Dorian Gray, referring in particular to a scene in the second chapter, in which Lord Henry Wotton explains his decadent philosophy to Dorian, an "innocent young man", in Carson's words.

Carson then moved to the factual evidence and questioned Wilde about his friendships with lower-class males, some of whom were as young as sixteen when Wilde had met them. Wilde admitted being on a first-name basis and lavishing gifts upon them, but insisted that nothing untoward had occurred and that the men were merely good friends of his. Carson repeatedly pointed out the unusual nature of these relationships and insinuated that the men were prostitutes. Wilde replied that he did not believe in social barriers and simply enjoyed the society of young men. Then Carson asked Wilde directly whether he had ever kissed a certain servant boy, Wilde responded, "Oh, dear no. He was a particularly plain boy – unfortunately ugly – I pitied him for it." Carson pressed him on the answer, repeatedly asking why the boy's ugliness was relevant. Wilde hesitated, then for the first time became flustered: "You sting me and insult me and try to unnerve me; and at times one says things flippantly when one ought to speak more seriously".

In his opening speech for the defence, Carson announced that he had located several male prostitutes who were to testify that they had had sex with Wilde. On the advice of his lawyers, Wilde dropped the prosecution. Queensberry was found not guilty, as the court declared that his accusation that Wilde was "posing as a Somdomite [sic]" was justified, "true in substance and in fact". Under the Libel Act 1843, Queensberry's acquittal rendered Wilde legally liable for the considerable expenses Queensberry had incurred in his defence, which left Wilde bankrupt.

=== Regina v Wilde ===
After Wilde left the court, a warrant for his arrest was applied for on charges of sodomy and gross indecency. Robbie Ross found Wilde at the Cadogan Hotel, Pont Street, Knightsbridge, with Reginald Turner. Both men advised Wilde to go at once to Dover and try to get a boat to France; his mother advised him to stay and fight. Wilde, lapsing into inaction, could only say, "The train has gone. It's too late." On 6 April 1895, Wilde was arrested for "gross indecency" under Section 11 of the Criminal Law Amendment Act 1885, a term meaning homosexual acts not amounting to buggery (an offence under a separate statute). (Note: See Offences Against the Person Act 1861, ss 61, 62) At Wilde's instruction, Ross and Wilde's butler forced their way into the bedroom and library of 16 Tite Street, packing some personal effects, manuscripts and letters, so they would not be sequestered by the police. Wilde was then imprisoned at Holloway, on remand while he received daily visits from Douglas.

Events moved quickly and his prosecution opened on 26 April 1895, before Justice Arthur Charles. Wilde pleaded not guilty. He had already begged Douglas to leave London for Paris, but Douglas complained bitterly, even wanting to give evidence; he was pressed to go and soon fled to the Hotel du Monde in France. Fearing persecution, Ross and many others also left the United Kingdom during this time. Under cross-examination, Wilde was at first hesitant, then spoke eloquently:

Charles Gill (prosecuting): What is "the love that dare not speak its name"?

Wilde: "The love that dare not speak its name" in this century is such a great affection of an elder for a younger man as there was between David and Jonathan, such as Plato made the very basis of his philosophy, and such as you find in the sonnets of Michelangelo and Shakespeare. It is that deep spiritual affection that is as pure as it is perfect. It dictates and pervades great works of art, like those of Shakespeare and Michelangelo, and those two letters of mine, such as they are. It is in this century misunderstood, so much misunderstood that it may be described as "the love that dare not speak its name", and on that account of it I am placed where I am now. It is beautiful, it is fine, it is the noblest form of affection. There is nothing unnatural about it. It is intellectual, and it repeatedly exists between an elder and a younger man, when the elder man has intellect, and the younger man has all the joy, hope and glamour of life before him. That it should be so, the world does not understand. The world mocks at it, and sometimes puts one in the pillory for it.

(Loud applause, mingled with some hisses.)

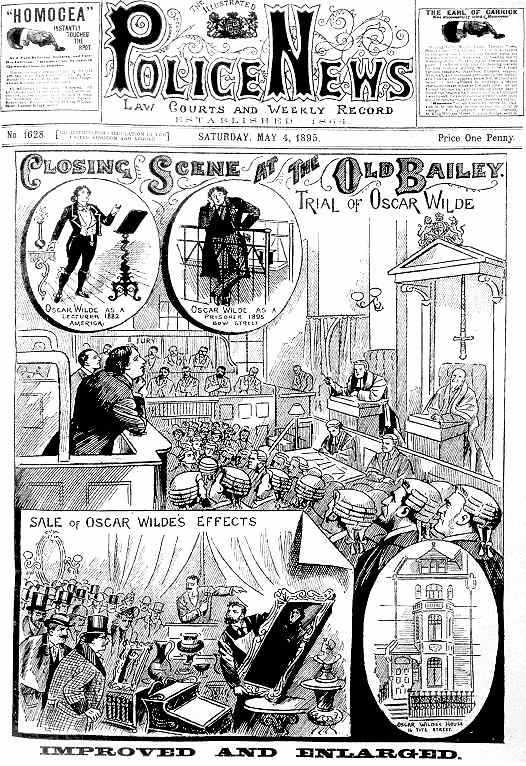
Wilde in the dock at the Old Bailey, from The Illustrated Police News, 4 May 1895

This response was counter-productive in a legal sense, for it only served to reinforce the charges of homosexual behaviour. The trial ended with the jury unable to reach a verdict. Wilde's counsel, Sir Edward Clarke, was finally able to get a magistrate to allow Wilde and his friends to post bail. The Reverend Stewart Headlam put up most of the £5,000 surety required by the court, having disagreed with Wilde's treatment by the press and the courts. Wilde was freed from Holloway and, shunning attention, went into hiding at the house of Ernest and Ada Leverson, two of his firm friends. Edward Carson approached Sir Frank Lockwood QC, the Solicitor General, and asked: "Can we not let up on the fellow now?" Lockwood answered that he would like to do so, but feared that the case had become too politicised to be dropped.

The final trial was presided over by Mr Justice Wills. On 25 May 1895, Wilde and Alfred Taylor were convicted of gross indecency and sentenced to two years' hard labour. The judge described the sentence, the maximum allowed, as "totally inadequate for a case such as this", and that the case was "the worst case I have ever tried". Wilde's response of "And I? May I say nothing, my Lord?" was drowned out in cries of "Shame" in the courtroom.

Although it is widely believed that the charges were related to Wilde's consensual activities, The Trials of Oscar Wilde, which includes an original transcript of the libel trial (which came to light in 2000), suggests that he took advantage of teenagers. Antony Edmonds feels that Wilde would have faced prosecution today: "For example, he certainly paid for sex with youths under the age of 18 which is a criminal offence. But even if his activities had led only to exposure and not to arrest, he would have been savagely pilloried in the media. Wilde was 39 when he seduced Alphonse Conway, and Conway was an inexperienced boy of 16". Another teenager who said he had engaged in sex acts with Wilde, Walter Grainger, who was 16 at the time, said Wilde had threatened him with "very serious trouble" if he told anyone about their relationship. Marriageable age (and the age of consent) in England was 16 at the time, having been 13 as recently as 1885: the Offences against the Person Act 1875 raised the age of consent to 13 years old, and a decade later, the Criminal Law Amendment Act 1885 raised the age of consent to 16 years old, just ten years before the trial.

== Imprisonment ==
When first I was put into prison some people advised me to try and forget who I was. It was ruinous advice. It is only by realising what I am that I have found comfort of any kind. Now I am advised by others to try on my release to forget that I have ever been in a prison at all. I know that would be equally fatal. It would mean that I would always be haunted by an intolerable sense of disgrace, and that those things that are meant for me as much as for anybody else – the beauty of the sun and moon, the pageant of the seasons, the music of daybreak and the silence of great nights, the rain falling through the leaves, or the dew creeping over the grass and making it silver – would all be tainted for me, and lose their healing power, and their power of communicating joy. To regret one's own experiences is to arrest one's own development. To deny one's own experiences is to put a lie into the lips of one's own life. It is no less than a denial of the soul.

— De Profundis

Having been convicted in "one of the first celebrity trials", Wilde was incarcerated from 25 May 1895 to 18 May 1897.

He first entered Newgate Prison in London for processing, then was moved to Pentonville Prison, where the "hard labour" to which he had been sentenced consisted of many hours of walking a treadmill and picking oakum (separating the fibres in scraps of old navy ropes), and where prisoners were allowed to read only the Bible and The Pilgrim's Progress.

A few months later he was moved to Wandsworth Prison in London. Inmates there also followed the regimen of "hard labour, hard fare and a hard bed", which wore harshly on Wilde's delicate health. In November, he collapsed during chapel from illness and hunger. His right ear drum was ruptured in the fall, an injury that later contributed to his death. He spent two months in the infirmary.

Richard B. Haldane, the Liberal MP and reformer, visited Wilde and had him transferred in November to Reading Gaol, 30 miles (48 km) west of London on 23 November 1895. The transfer itself was the lowest point of his incarceration, as a crowd jeered and spat at him on the platform at Clapham Junction railway station (in 2019 a rainbow plaque was unveiled at the station recalling this event). He spent the remainder of his sentence at Reading, addressed and identified only as "C.3.3" – the occupant of the third cell on the third floor of C ward.

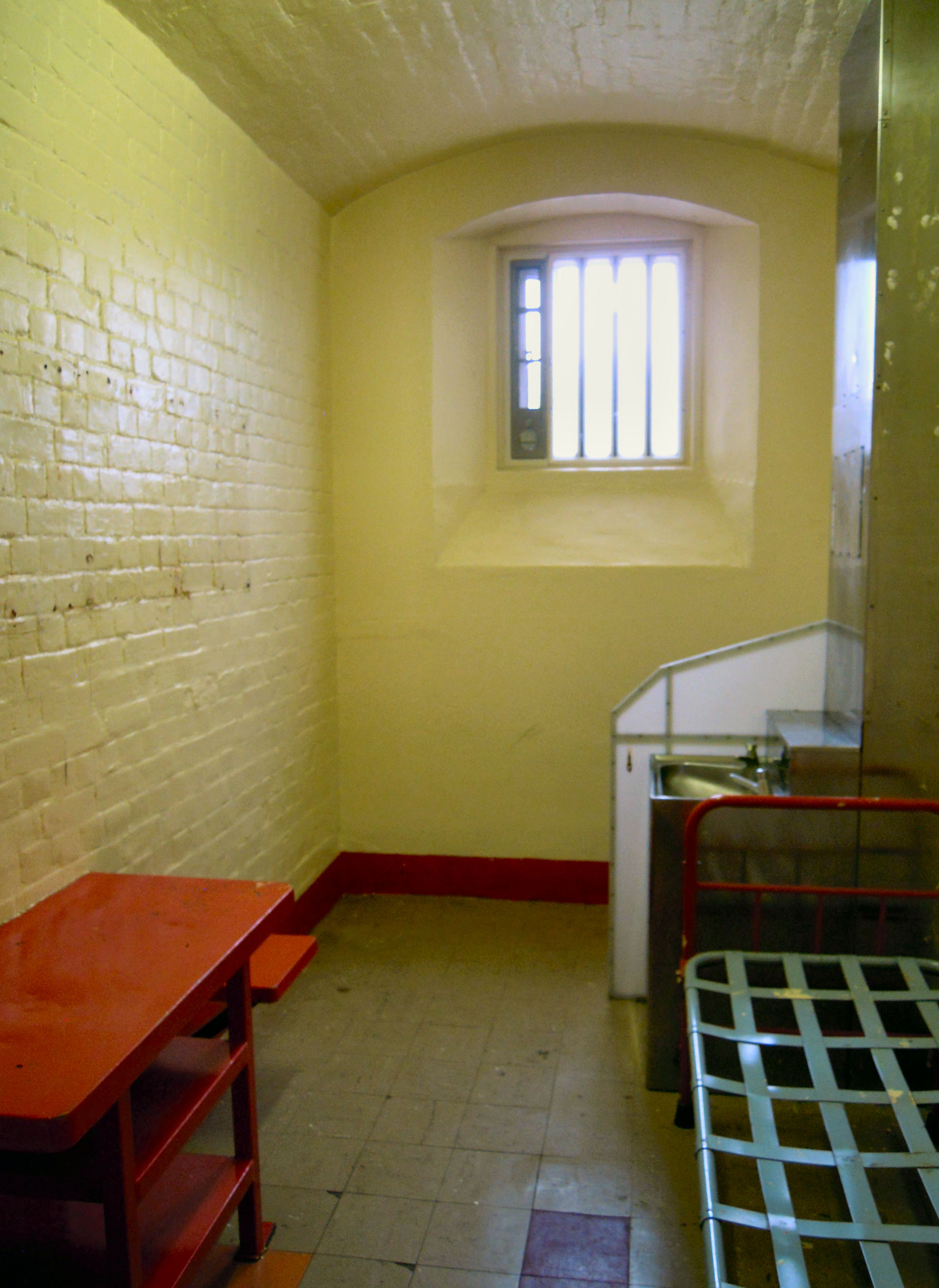
Wilde's cell in Reading Gaol in 2016

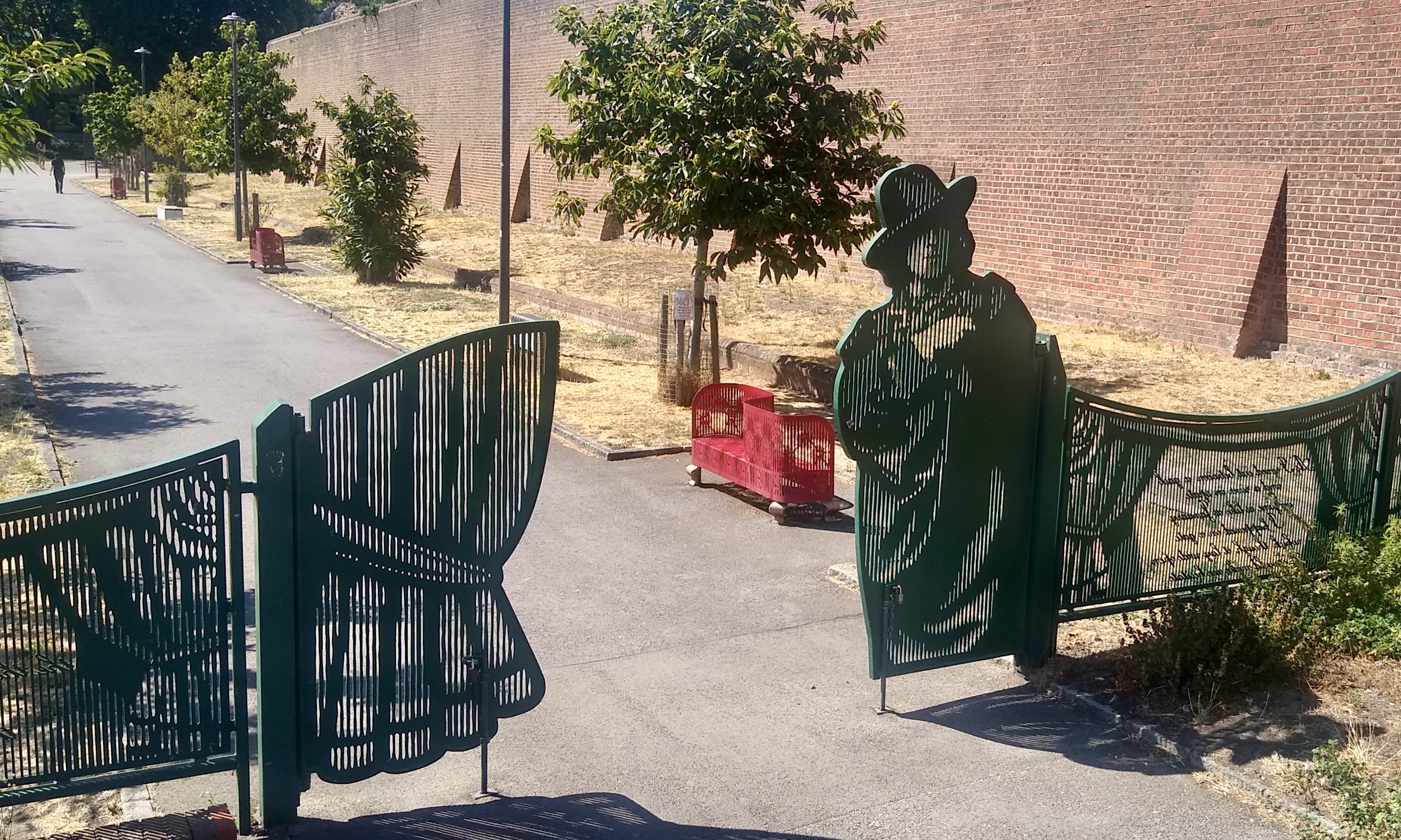
The memorial gates to Oscar Wilde in Reading, Berkshire, designed by Bruce Williams and unveiled in 2000: The brick, perimeter wall of Reading Goal is on the right and the metalwork incorporates words by Paul Muldoon, an Irish poet.

About five months after Wilde arrived at Reading Gaol (Jail), Charles Thomas Wooldridge, a trooper in the Royal Horse Guards, was brought to Reading to await his trial for murdering his wife on 29 March 1896; on 17 June Wooldridge was sentenced to death and returned to Reading for his execution, which took place on Tuesday, 7 July 1896 – the first hanging at Reading in 18 years. From Wooldridge's hanging, Wilde later wrote The Ballad of Reading Gaol.

Wilde was not, at first, even allowed paper and pen, but Haldane eventually succeeded in allowing access to books and writing materials. Wilde requested, among others, the Bible in French; Italian and German grammars; some Ancient Greek texts; Dante's Divine Comedy; Joris-Karl Huysmans's new French novel about Christian redemption, En route; and essays by St Augustine, Cardinal Newman and Walter Pater.

Between January and March 1897 Wilde wrote a 50,000-word letter to Douglas. He was not allowed to send it but was permitted to take it with him when released from prison. In reflective mode, Wilde coldly examines his career to date, how he had been a colourful agent provocateur in Victorian society, his art, like his paradoxes, seeking to subvert as well as sparkle. His estimation of himself was: one who "stood in symbolic relations to the art and culture of my age". It was from these heights that his life with Douglas began, and Wilde examines that particularly closely, repudiating him for what Wilde finally sees as his arrogance and vanity: he had not forgotten Douglas' remark, when he was ill, "When you are not on your pedestal you are not interesting." Wilde blamed himself, though, for the ethical degradation of character that he allowed Douglas to bring about in him, and took responsibility for his own fall: "I am here for having tried to put your father in prison." The first half concludes with Wilde forgiving Douglas, for his own sake as much as Douglas's. The second half of the letter traces Wilde's spiritual journey of redemption and fulfilment through his prison reading. He realised that his ordeal had filled his soul with the fruit of experience, however bitter it tasted at the time.

I wanted to eat of the fruit of all the trees in the garden of the world ... And so, indeed, I went out, and so I lived. My only mistake was that I confined myself so exclusively to the trees of what seemed to me the sun-lit side of the garden, and shunned the other side for its shadow and its gloom.

Wilde was released from prison on 19 May 1897 and sailed that evening for Dieppe, France. He never returned to the United Kingdom.

On his release, he gave the manuscript to Ross, who may or may not have carried out Wilde's instructions to send a copy to Douglas (who later denied having received it). The letter was partially published in 1905 as De Profundis; its complete and correct publication first occurred in 1962 in The Letters of Oscar Wilde. (Note: Ross published a version of the letter expurgated of all references to Douglas in 1905 with the title De Profundis, expanding it slightly for an edition of Wilde's collected works in 1908, and then donated it to the British Museum on the understanding that it would not be made public until 1960. In 1949, Wilde's son Vyvyan Holland published it again, including parts formerly omitted, but relying on a faulty typescript bequeathed to him by Ross. Ross's typescript had contained several hundred errors, including typist's mistakes, Ross's "improvements" and other inexplicable omissions.)

== Final years: 1897–1900 ==
=== Exile ===
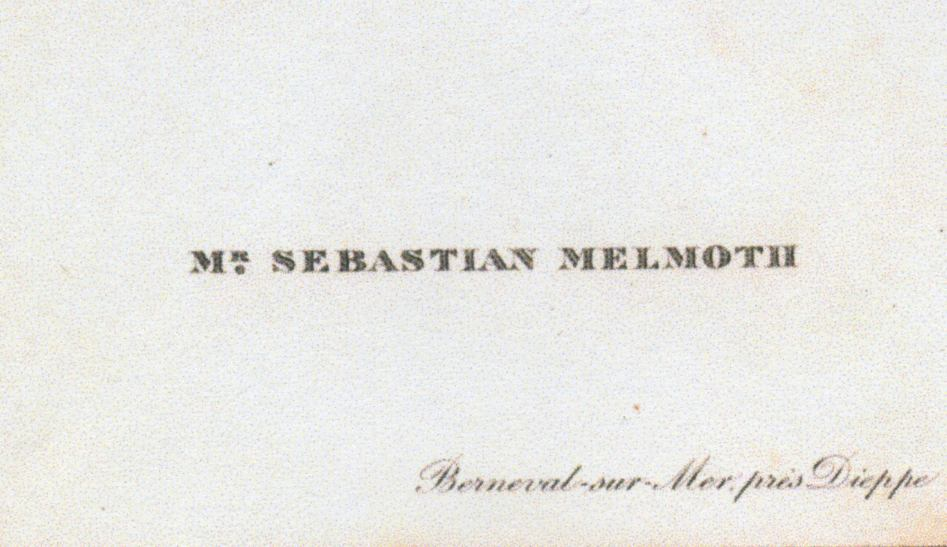
Oscar Wilde's visiting card after his release from jail

Though Wilde's health had suffered greatly from the harshness and diet of prison, he had a feeling of spiritual renewal. He immediately wrote to the Society of Jesus requesting a six-month Catholic retreat; when the request was denied, Wilde wept. "I intend to be received into the Catholic Church before long", Wilde told a journalist who asked about his religious intentions.

Wilde spent his last three years usually impoverished and in exile. He took the name "Sebastian Melmoth", after Saint Sebastian and the title character of Melmoth the Wanderer (a Gothic novel by Charles Maturin, Wilde's great-uncle). Wilde wrote two long letters to the editor of the Daily Chronicle, describing the brutal conditions of English prisons and advocating penal reform. His discussion of the dismissal of Warder Martin for giving biscuits to an anaemic child prisoner repeated the themes of the corruption and degeneration of punishment that he had earlier outlined in The Soul of Man under Socialism.

The English writer Ernest Dowson, who had known Wilde for a number of years and was one of the few individuals to support him during and after his conviction, is said to have remade his acquaintance in Dieppe. In a story later repeated by W.B. Yeats, Dowson encouraged Wilde to visit a brothel and have sex with a female prostitute "in order to repair his reputation". According to Dowson, after the encounter Wilde "said in a low voice 'The first these ten years, and it will be the last. It was like cold mutton ... But tell it in England, for it will entirely restore my character'."

Wilde spent mid-1897 with Robert Ross in the seaside village of Berneval-le-Grand in northern France, where he wrote The Ballad of Reading Gaol, narrating the execution of Charles Thomas Wooldridge, who murdered his wife in a rage at her infidelity. It moves from an objective story-telling to symbolic identification with the prisoners. No attempt is made to assess the justice of the laws which convicted them but rather the poem highlights the brutality of the punishment that all convicts share. Wilde juxtaposes the executed man and himself with the line "Yet each man kills the thing he loves". He adopted the proletarian ballad form and the author was credited as "C33", Wilde's cell number in Reading Gaol. He suggested that it be published in Reynolds' Magazine, "because it circulates widely among the criminal classes – to which I now belong – for once I will be read by my peers – a new experience for me". It was an immediate roaring commercial success, going through seven editions in less than two years, only after which "[Oscar Wilde]" was added to the title page, though many in literary circles had known Wilde to be the author.

Although Douglas had been the cause of his misfortunes, he and Wilde were reunited in August 1897 at Rouen. This meeting was disapproved of by the friends and families of both men. Constance Wilde was already refusing to meet Wilde or allow him to see their sons, though she sent him money – three pounds a week - until her death in April 1898. During the latter part of 1897, Wilde and Douglas lived together near Naples for a few months until they were separated by their families under the threat of cutting off all funds. Wilde left Italy in December 1897 and returned to France, settling in Paris in February 1898.

Wilde's arrival in Paris coincided with the height of the Dreyfus affair, when Emile Zola was prosecuted over his article J'accuse...!. After Zola was convicted, Wilde helped Zola by passing on, from his friend Carlos Blacker who was an intimate friend of the Italian military attache Alessandro Panizzardi, the first document that implicated Ferdinand Walsin Esterhazy as the real treasonous contact with the German Embassy, of which Alfred Dreyfus had been falsely accused. The contents were published in the newspaper Le Siecle on 4 April 1898 as the article Lettre d'un Diplomate. It revived the Dreyfusard cause politically, but it caused a friendship break between Wilde and Blacker, who suffered press attacks over the revelations.

Wilde's final address was at the dingy Hôtel d'Alsace (now known as L'Hôtel), on rue des Beaux-Arts in Saint-Germain-des-Prés, Paris. "This poverty really breaks one's heart: it is so sale [filthy], so utterly depressing, so hopeless. Pray do what you can" he wrote to his publisher. He corrected and published An Ideal Husband and The Importance of Being Earnest, the proofs of which, according to Ellmann, show a man "very much in command of himself and of the play", but he refused to write anything else: "I can write, but have lost the joy of writing".

He wandered the boulevards alone and spent what little money he had on alcohol. A series of embarrassing chance encounters with hostile English visitors, or Frenchmen he had known in better days, drowned his spirit. Soon Wilde was sufficiently confined to his hotel to joke, on one of his final trips outside, "My wallpaper and I are fighting a duel to the death. One of us has got to go". On 12 October 1900 he sent a telegram to Ross: "Terribly weak. Please come". His moods fluctuated; Max Beerbohm relates how their mutual friend Reginald 'Reggie' Turner had found Wilde very depressed after a nightmare. "I dreamt that I had died, and was supping with the dead!" "I am sure," Turner replied, "that you must have been the life and soul of the party." In early 1900 in Sicily, Oscar Wilde became involved in a relationship with the 15 year old Giuseppe Loverde.

=== Death ===
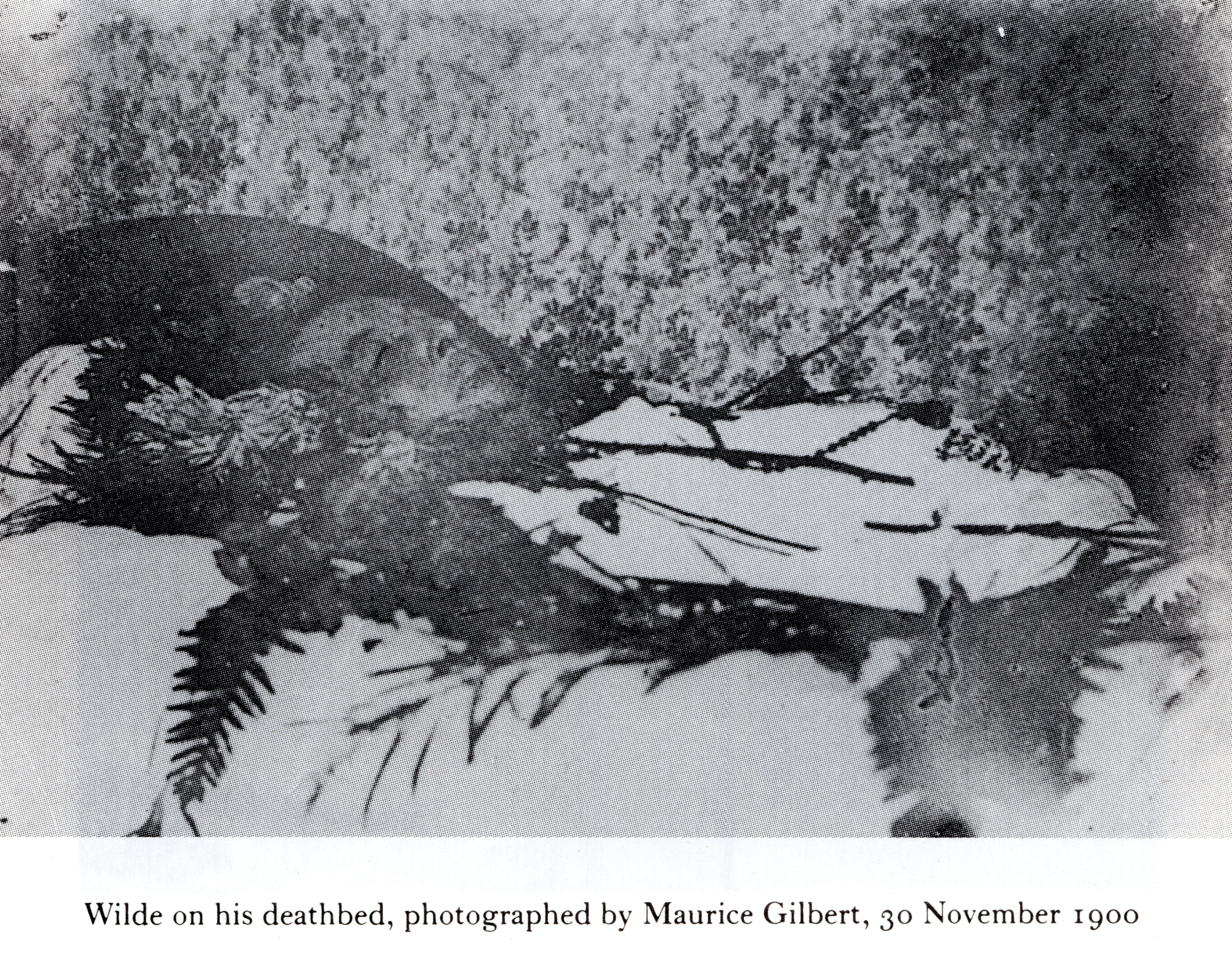
Oscar Wilde on his deathbed in 1900. Photograph by Maurice Gilbert.

By 25 November 1900, Wilde had developed meningitis, then called "cerebral meningitis". Robbie Ross arrived on 29 November and sent for a priest; Wilde was conditionally baptised into the Catholic Church by Fr Cuthbert Dunne, a Passionist priest from Dublin, who was resident in Paris. Fr Dunne recorded the baptism:

As the voiture rolled through the dark streets that wintry night, the sad story of Oscar Wilde was in part repeated to me ... Robert Ross knelt by the bedside, assisting me as best he could while I administered conditional baptism, and afterwards answering the responses while I gave Extreme Unction to the prostrate man and recited the prayers for the dying. As the man was in a semi-comatose condition, I did not venture to administer the Holy Viaticum; still I must add that he could be roused and was roused from this state in my presence. When roused, he gave signs of being inwardly conscious ... Indeed I was fully satisfied that he understood me when told that I was about to receive him into the Catholic Church and gave him the Last Sacraments ... And when I repeated close to his ear the Holy Names, the Acts of Contrition, Faith, Hope and Charity, with acts of humble resignation to the Will of God, he tried all through to say the words after me. (Note: Robert Ross, in his letter to More Adey (dated 14 December 1900), described a similar scene: "(Wilde) was conscious that people were in the room, and raised his hand when I asked him whether he understood. He pressed our hands. I then went in search of a priest and with great difficulty found Fr Cuthbert Dunne, of the Passionists, who came with me at once and administered Baptism and Extreme Unction – Oscar could not take the Eucharist".)

Wilde died of meningitis on 30 November 1900. Dubious opinions have been given as to the cause of the disease: Richard Ellmann judged it was syphilitic; Merlin Holland, Wilde's grandson, thought this to be a misconception, noting that Wilde's meningitis followed a surgical intervention, perhaps a mastoidectomy; Wilde's physicians, Paul Cleiss and A'Court Tucker, reported that the condition stemmed from an old suppuration of the right ear (from the prison injury, see above) treated for several years (une ancienne suppuration de l'oreille droite d'ailleurs en traitement depuis plusieurs années) and made no allusion to syphilis.

=== Burial ===
The tomb of Oscar Wilde (surrounded by glass barrier) in Père Lachaise Cemetery

Wilde was initially buried in the Cimetière de Bagneux outside Paris; in 1909 his remains were disinterred and transferred to the Père Lachaise Cemetery, inside the city. His tomb there was designed by Sir Jacob Epstein. (Note: Epstein produced the design with architect Charles Holden, for whom Epstein produced several controversial commissions in London.) It was commissioned by Robert Ross, who asked for a small compartment to be made for his own ashes, which were duly transferred in 1950. The modernist angel depicted as a relief on the tomb was originally complete with male genitalia, which were initially censored by French authorities with a golden leaf. The genitals have since been vandalised; their current whereabouts are unknown. In 2000, Leon Johnson, a multimedia artist, installed a silver prosthesis to replace them. In 2011, the tomb was cleaned of the many lipstick marks left there by admirers and a glass barrier was installed to prevent further marks or damage.

The epitaph is a verse from The Ballad of Reading Gaol,

And alien tears will fill for him
Pity's long-broken urn,
For his mourners will be outcast men,
And outcasts always mourn.

=== Posthumous pardon ===
In 2017, Wilde was among an estimated 50,000 men who were pardoned for homosexual acts that were no longer considered offences under the Policing and Crime Act 2017 (homosexuality was decriminalised in England and Wales in 1967). The 2017 Act implemented what is known informally as the Alan Turing law.

In 2025, the British Library restored Wilde's library card after the conviction-related revocation of the card 130 years before. The new card was accepted by Wilde's grandson Merlin Holland.

=== Honours ===
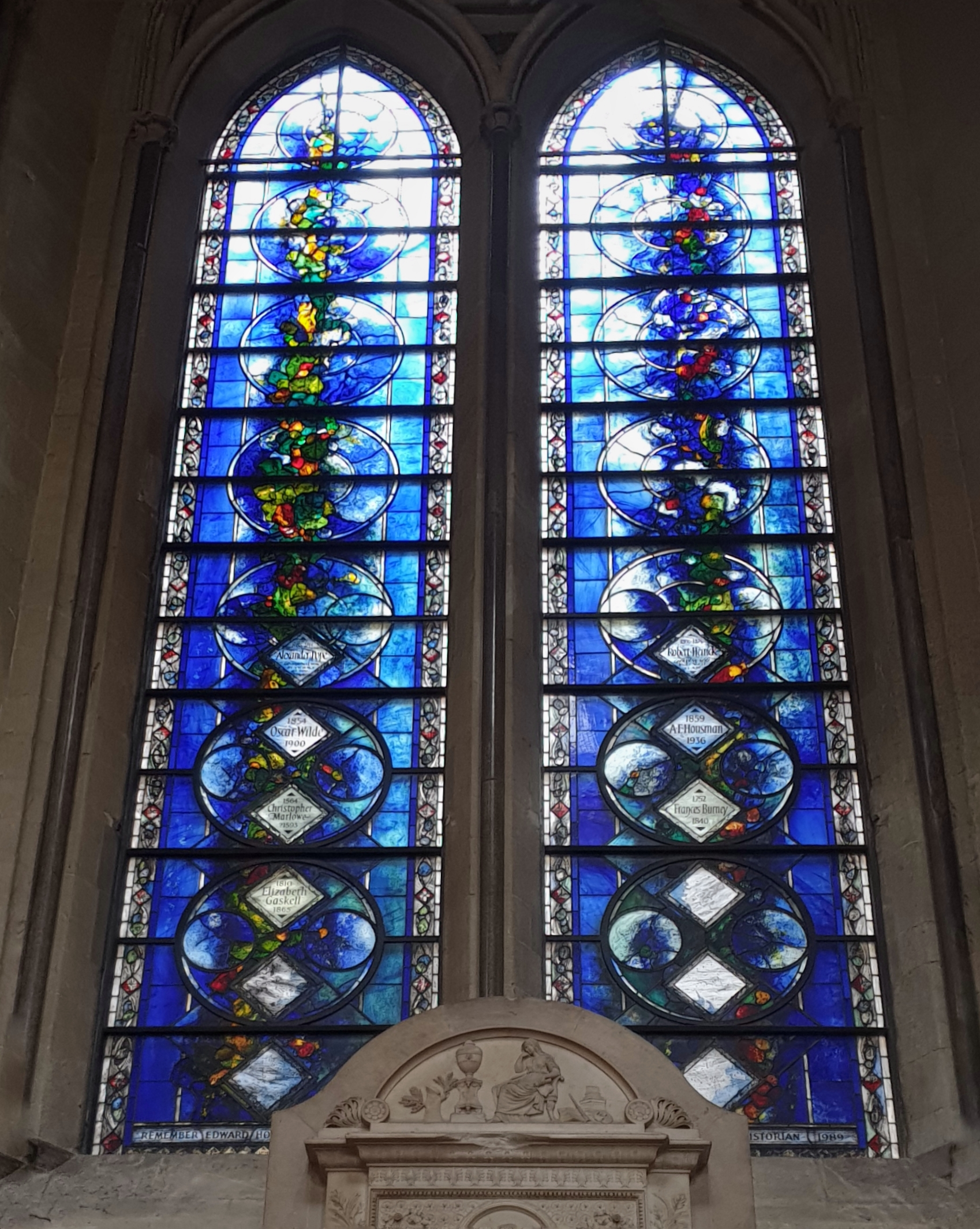
Wilde is commemorated in this stained-glass window at Westminster Abbey, London.

Wilde is generally considered by most literary commentators to be the greatest playwright of the Victorian era. Several honours have been erected in his memory. On 14 February 1995, Wilde was commemorated with a stained-glass window at Poets' Corner in Westminster Abbey. The memorial, above the monument to Geoffrey Chaucer, was unveiled by his grandson Merlin Holland, while Sir John Gielgud read from the final part of De Profundis and Dame Judi Dench read an extract from The Importance of Being Earnest.

In 2014, Wilde was one of the inaugural honorees in the Rainbow Honor Walk, a walk of fame in San Francisco's Castro neighbourhood noting LGBTQ people who have "made significant contributions in their fields".

The Oscar Wilde Temple, an installation by visual artists McDermott & McGough, opened in 2017 in cooperation with Church of the Village in New York City, then moved to Studio Voltaire in London the next year.

== Biographies ==
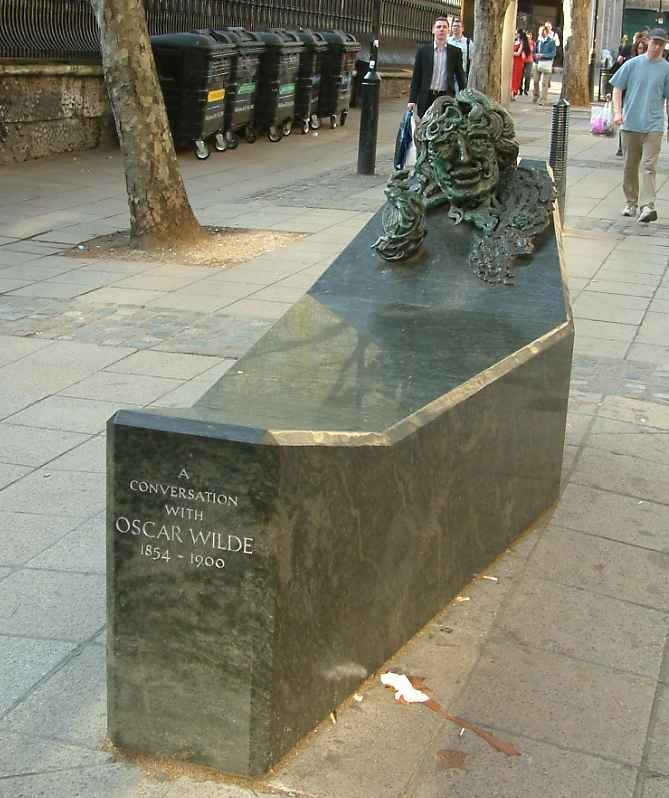
A Conversation with Oscar Wilde – a civic monument to Wilde by Maggi Hambling, on Adelaide Street, near Trafalgar Square, London. It contains the inscription, "We are all in the gutter, but some of us are looking at the stars".

Wilde's life has been the subject of numerous biographies since his death. The earliest were memoirs by those who knew him: often they are personal or impressionistic accounts which can be good character sketches but are sometimes factually unreliable. Frank Harris, his friend and editor, wrote a biography, Oscar Wilde: His Life and Confessions (1916); though prone to exaggeration and sometimes factually inaccurate, it offers a good literary portrait of Wilde. Lord Alfred Douglas wrote three books about his relationship with Wilde. Oscar Wilde and Myself (1914), largely ghost-written by T. W. H. Crosland, vindictively reacted to Douglas's discovery that De Profundis was addressed to him and defensively tried to distance him from Wilde's scandalous reputation. Both authors later regretted their work. Later, in Oscar Wilde: A Summing Up (1939) and his Autobiography, Douglas was more sympathetic to Wilde. Of Wilde's other close friends, Robert Sherard; Robert Ross, his literary executor; and Charles Ricketts variously published biographies, reminiscences or correspondence. The first more or less objective biography of Wilde came about when Hesketh Pearson wrote Oscar Wilde: His Life and Wit (1946). In 1954 Wilde's son Vyvyan Holland published his memoir Son of Oscar Wilde, which recounts the difficulties Wilde's wife and children faced after his imprisonment. It was revised and updated by Merlin Holland in 1989.

Later on, I think everyone will recognise his achievements; his plays and essays will endure. Of course, you may think with others that his personality and conversation were far more wonderful than anything he wrote, so that his written works give only a pale reflection of his power. Perhaps that is so, and of course, it will be impossible to reproduce what is gone forever.

— Robert Ross, 23 December 1900

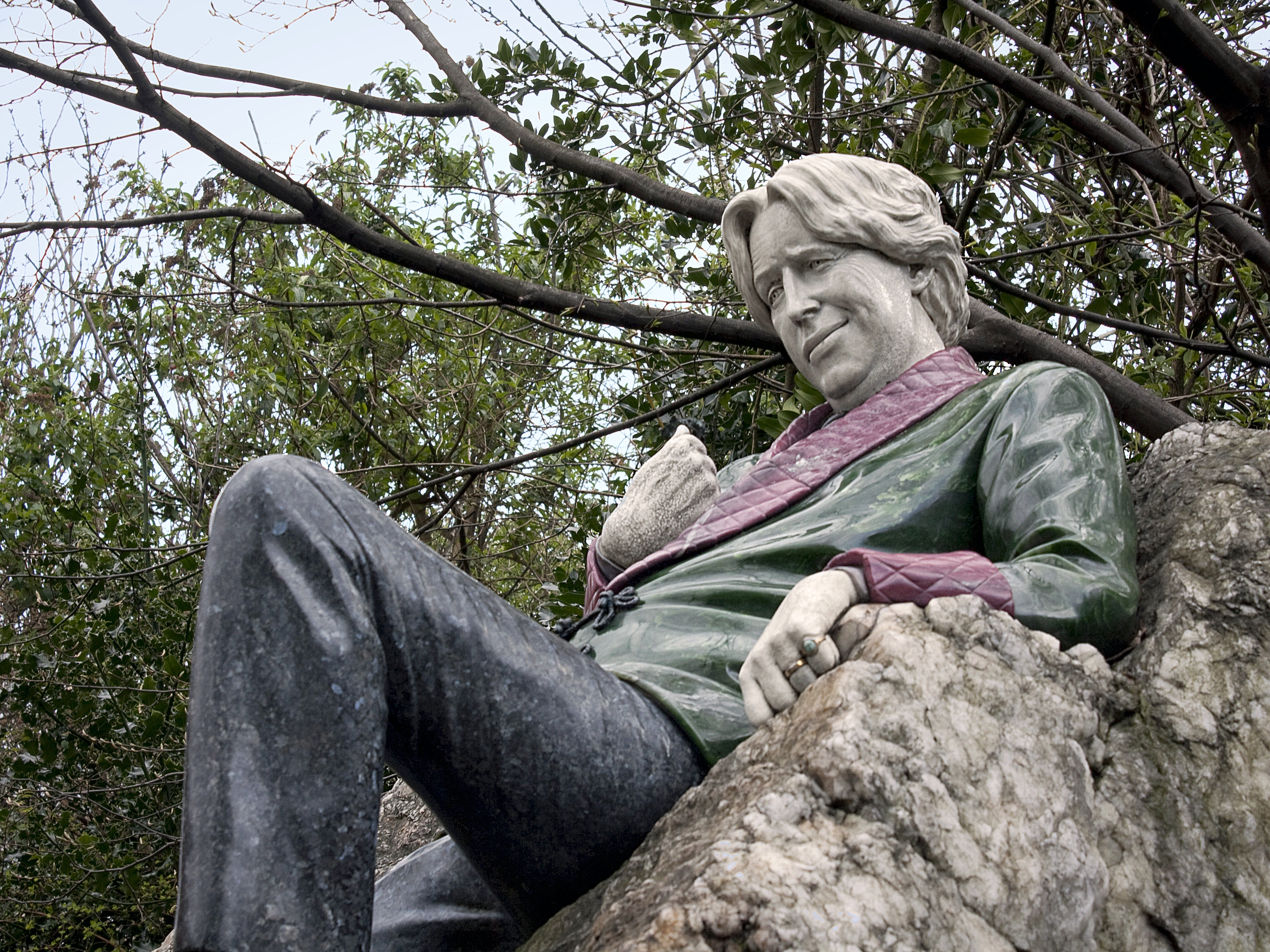
Oscar Wilde Memorial Sculpture in Merrion Square, Dublin

Oscar Wilde: A Critical Study by Arthur Ransome was published in 1912. The book only briefly mentioned Wilde's life, but subsequently, Ransome (and The Times Book Club) were sued for libel by Lord Alfred Douglas. At the High Court in London in April 1913, Douglas lost the libel action after a reading of De Profundis refuted his claims.

Richard Ellmann wrote his 1987 biography Oscar Wilde, for which he posthumously won a National (US) Book Critics Circle Award in 1988 and a Pulitzer Prize in 1989. In 1997, it was the basis for the British film Wilde, directed by Brian Gilbert and starring Stephen Fry as the title character.

Neil McKenna's 2003 biography, The Secret Life of Oscar Wilde, offers an exploration of Wilde's sexuality. Often speculative in nature, it was widely criticised for its pure conjecture and lack of scholarly rigour. Thomas Wright's Oscar's Books (2008) explores Wilde's reading from his childhood in Dublin to his death in Paris. After tracking down many books that once belonged to Wilde's Tite Street library (dispersed at the time of his trials), Wright was the first to examine Wilde's marginalia.

In 2018, Matthew Sturgis' Oscar: A Life, was published in London. The book incorporates rediscovered letters and other documents and is the most extensively researched biography of Wilde to appear since 1988. Rupert Everett starred as Wilde in, and wrote the screenplay for, The Happy Prince (2018), a biographical drama film about Wilde following his release from prison.

Parisian literati also produced several biographies and monographs on him. André Gide wrote In Memoriam, Oscar Wilde and Wilde also features in his journals. Thomas Louis, who had earlier translated books on Wilde into French, produced his own L'esprit d'Oscar Wilde in 1920. Modern books include Philippe Jullian's Oscar Wilde, and L'affaire Oscar Wilde, ou, Du danger de laisser la justice mettre le nez dans nos draps (The Oscar Wilde Affair, or, On the Danger of Allowing Justice to put its Nose in our Sheets) by Odon Vallet, a French religious historian.

Merlin Holland, Wilde's grandson, wrote After Oscar, The Legacy of a Scandal (2025) a work that seeks to undo the fallacies and fabrications about Wilde's life. Holland writes that Wilde died of cerebral meningitis following an ear injury that he had sustained in prison, and not from syphilis. Holland also writes that his mother Thelma had burnt pages from his father Vyvyan's book Son of Oscar Wilde insisting that Wilde was basically heterosexual.

== Selected works ==
- Ravenna (1878)
- Poems (1881)
- The Happy Prince and Other Stories (1888, fairy stories)
- Lord Arthur Savile's Crime and Other Stories (1891, stories)
- A House of Pomegranates (1891, fairy stories)
- Intentions (1891, essays and dialogues on aesthetics)
- The Picture of Dorian Gray (first published in Lippincott's Monthly Magazine July 1890, in book form in 1891; novel)
- The Soul of Man under Socialism (1891, political essay)
- Lady Windermere's Fan (1892, play)
- Salomé (published 1893, performed 1896; play)
- A Woman of No Importance (1893, play)
- The Sphinx (1894, poem)
- An Ideal Husband (performed 1895, published 1898; play)
- The Importance of Being Earnest (performed 1895, published 1899; play)
- De Profundis (written 1897, published variously 1905, 1908, 1949, 1962; epistle)
- The Ballad of Reading Gaol (1898, poem)

== See also ==
- List of Irish people
- List of people from Dublin
- Oscar Wilde Memorial Sculpture
