= Merlin Holland =

British writer (born 1945)

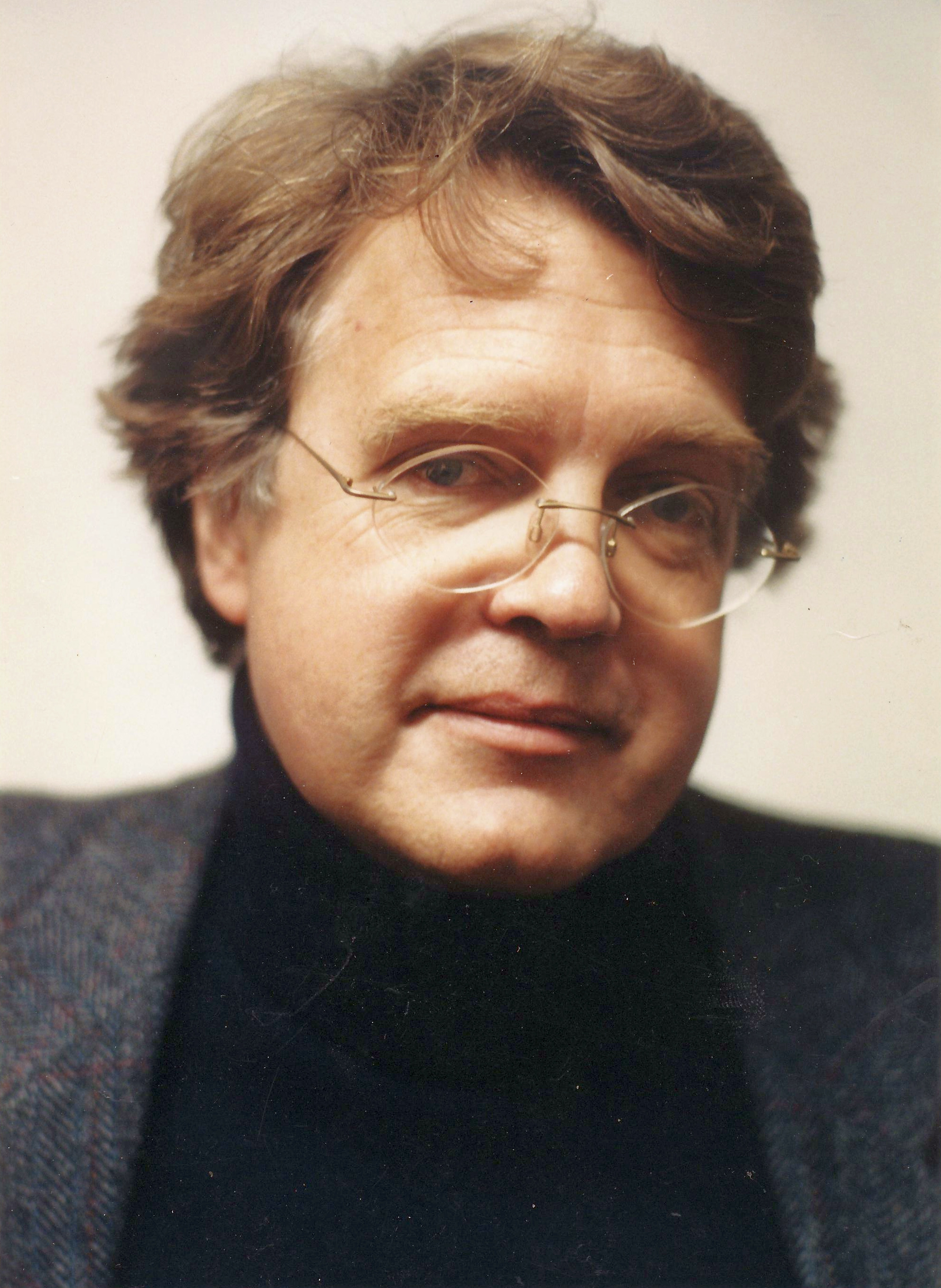
- Born: December 1945 (age 80); London, England
- Occupations: Biographer, editor
- Spouse: Sarah Parker
- Children: 1
- Father: Vyvyan Holland
- Relatives: Oscar Wilde (paternal grandfather); Constance Lloyd (paternal grandmother)

Christopher Merlin Vyvyan Holland (born 18 December 1945) is a British and Irish biographer and editor. He is the only grandchild of Oscar Wilde, whose life he has researched and written about extensively.

== Biography ==
Born in London on 18 December 1945, Christopher Merlin Vyvyan Holland is the son of the author Vyvyan Holland and his second wife, Thelma Besant. He is the only grandchild of Oscar Wilde and Constance Lloyd.

His mother, Thelma, was an Australian cosmetician who became the personal beauty adviser to Queen Elizabeth II for about 10 years from the mid-1940s. His paternal grandmother, Constance, changed her and her children's surname to Holland (an old family name) in 1895, after Wilde was convicted of homosexual acts and imprisoned, in order to gain some privacy from the scandal.

== Work ==
Holland has studied and researched Wilde's life for more than thirty years. He is the co-editor, with Rupert Hart-Davis, of The Complete Letters of Oscar Wilde. He is the editor of Irish Peacock and Scarlet Marquess, the first uncensored version of his grandfather's 1895 civil trial. (The book is titled The Real Trial of Oscar Wilde for release in the US.)

Holland has criticised Richard Ellmann's 1987 biography, Oscar Wilde, as inaccurate, particularly his claim that Wilde had syphilis and transmitted it to Constance. According to The Guardian, Holland has "unearthed medical evidence within private family letters, which has enabled a doctor to determine the likely cause of Constance's death. The letters reveal symptoms nowadays associated with multiple sclerosis but apparently wrongly diagnosed by her two doctors. One, an unnamed German 'nerve doctor', resorted to dubious remedies and the other, Luigi Maria Bossi, conducted a botched operation that days later claimed her life."

Holland has also written The Wilde Album, a small volume that included hitherto unpublished photographs of Wilde. The book concerns how the scandal caused by Wilde's trials affected his family, most notably his wife, Constance, and their children, Cyril and Vyvyan.

In 2006, his book Oscar Wilde: A Life in Letters was published, and his volume Coffee with Oscar Wilde, an imagined conversation with Wilde, was released in the autumn of 2007. Holland also wrote A Portrait of Oscar Wilde (2008), which reveals Wilde through manuscripts and letters from the Lucia Moreira Salles collection, located at The Morgan Library & Museum in New York City.

In addition, Holland has also published features about wine and occasional articles for the magazines Country Life and The Oldie.

In July 2013, Holland gave the main address for a symposium on Oscar Wilde presented by The Santa Fe Opera. The address surveyed the popular and critical attitudes towards Wilde and his work from the end of his life to the present time. The symposium was given in conjunction with the opera company's world premiere presentations of Oscar, composed by Theodore Morrison with a libretto written by John Cox and the composer.

Holland's play The Trials of Oscar Wilde, co-authored with John O'Connor and re-enacting the 1895 trials of Lord Queensberry for libel and Oscar Wilde for gross indecency, toured the United Kingdom in 2014 as a production by the European Arts Company.

In October 2025, Holland published After Oscar: The Legacy of a Scandal, his long-anticipated retrospective, which debunks many biographical misunderstandings and family myths that have developed since Wilde's release from prison in 1897 and his death in 1900.

== Personal life ==
Holland lives in Burgundy, France, with his second wife. His son, Lucian Holland (born 1979 to Merlin's first wife Sarah), studied classics at Magdalen College, Oxford, his grandfather Oscar Wilde's old college.

Holland briefly considered changing his name to Wilde. He told The New York Times in 1998,

But if I did it, it would have to be not just for Oscar, but for his father and mother, too, for the whole family. It was an extraordinary family before he came along, so if I put the family name back on the map for the right reasons, then it's all right.

Holland's godfather was Frederick Smith, 2nd Earl of Birkenhead, a British biographer best known for writing a biography of Rudyard Kipling that was suppressed by the Kipling family for many years, and which he never lived to see in print. Lord Birkenhead knew Edward Carson, the barrister who led the defence against Wilde's action for criminal libel against John Douglas, 9th Marquess of Queensberry.

== Published works ==
- 1997: The Wit of Oscar Wilde
- 1998: The Wilde Album
- 2003: Irish Peacock and Scarlet Marquess: The Real Trial of Oscar Wilde
- 2004: The Real Trial of Oscar Wilde
- 2025: After Oscar, The Legacy of a Scandal
