= Oscar Wilde Memorial Sculpture =

Collection of three statues in Dublin, Ireland

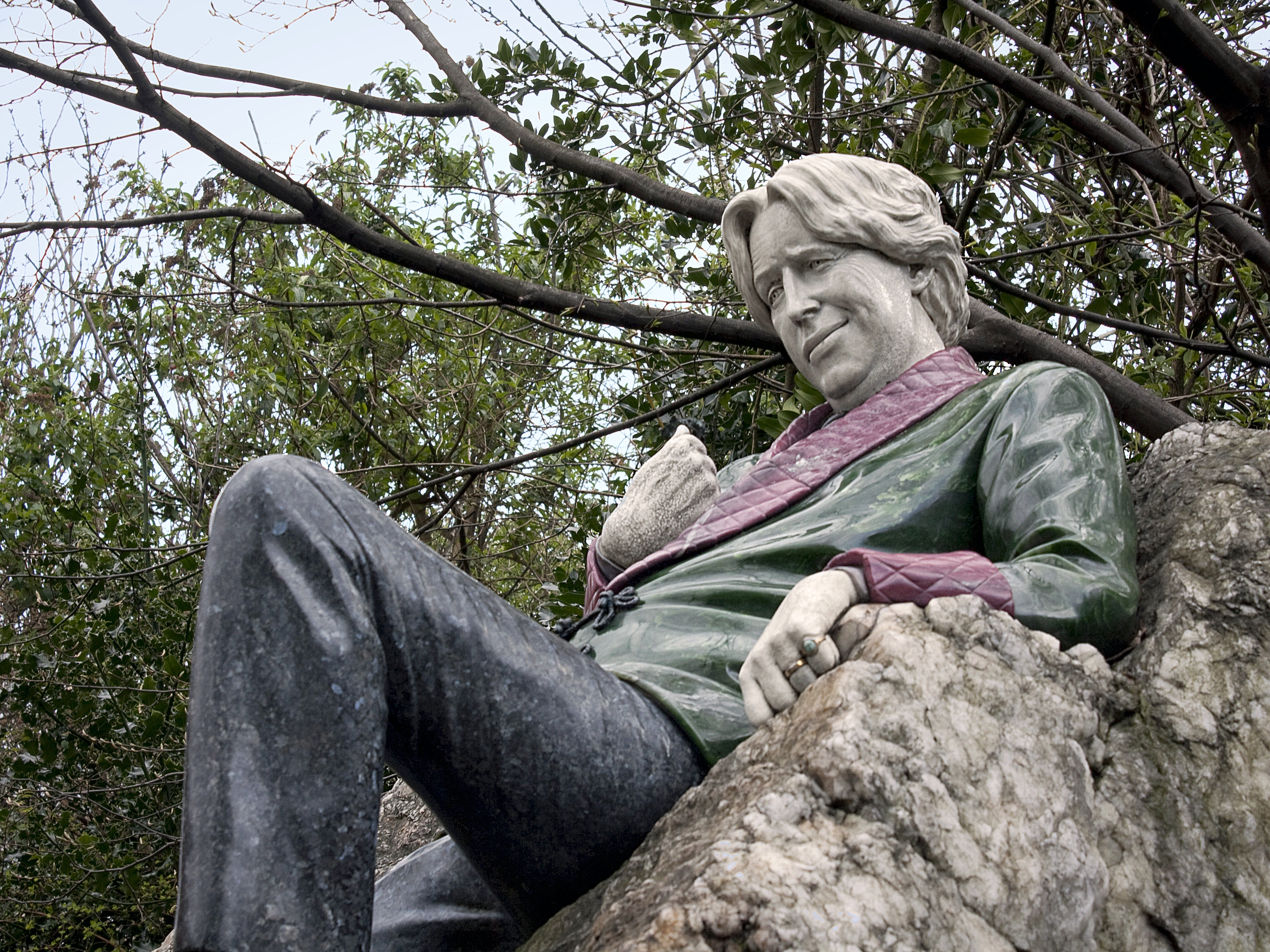
- The statue of Wilde in 2010

- Location in Dublin
- Artist: Danny Osborne
- Year: 1997
- Medium: Granite; charnockite; jadeite; nephrite jade; porcelain; quartz; thulite
- Subject: Oscar Wilde
- Location: Dublin, Ireland; 53°20′27″N 6°15′02″W

Constance Lloyd
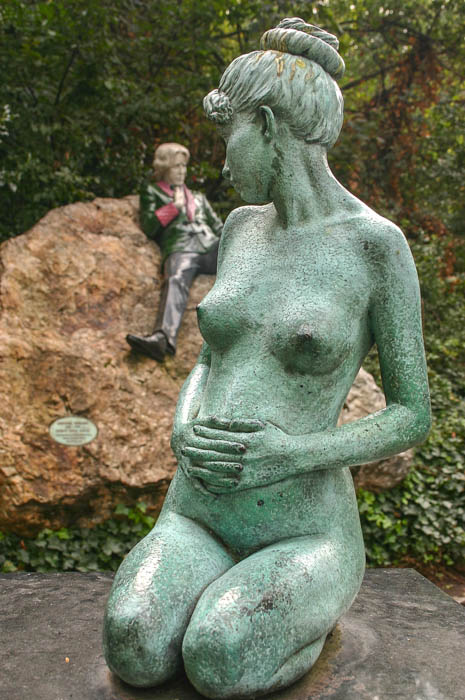
- The statue of Constance Lloyd in 2013
- Medium: Bronze; granite
- Subject: Constance Lloyd

Dionysus
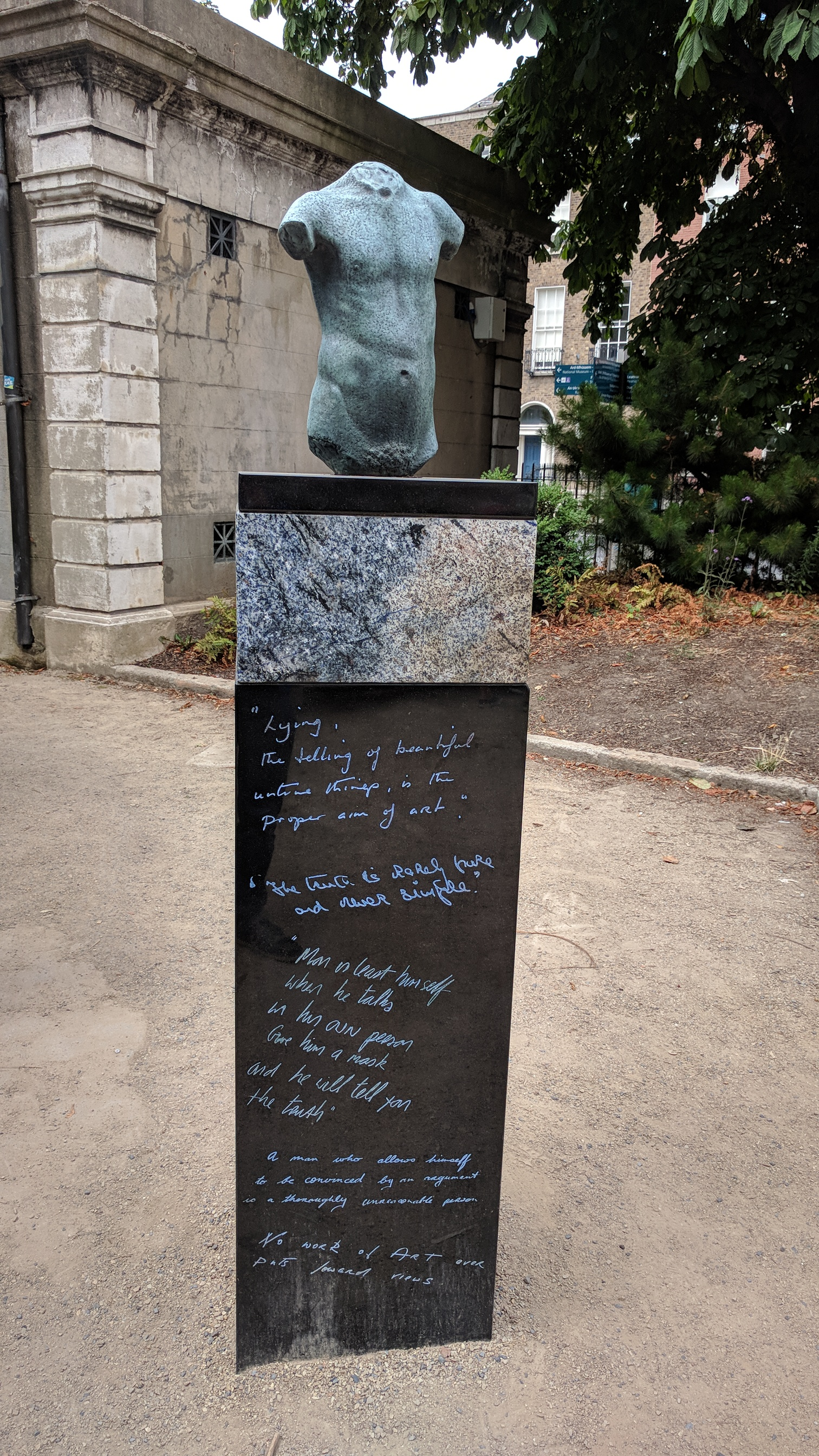
- The Dionysus statue in 2018
- Medium: Bronze; granite
- Subject: Dionysus

The Oscar Wilde Memorial Sculpture is a collection of three statues in Merrion Square in Dublin, Ireland, commemorating Irish poet and playwright Oscar Wilde. The sculptures were unveiled in 1997 and were designed and made by Danny Osborne.

== History ==
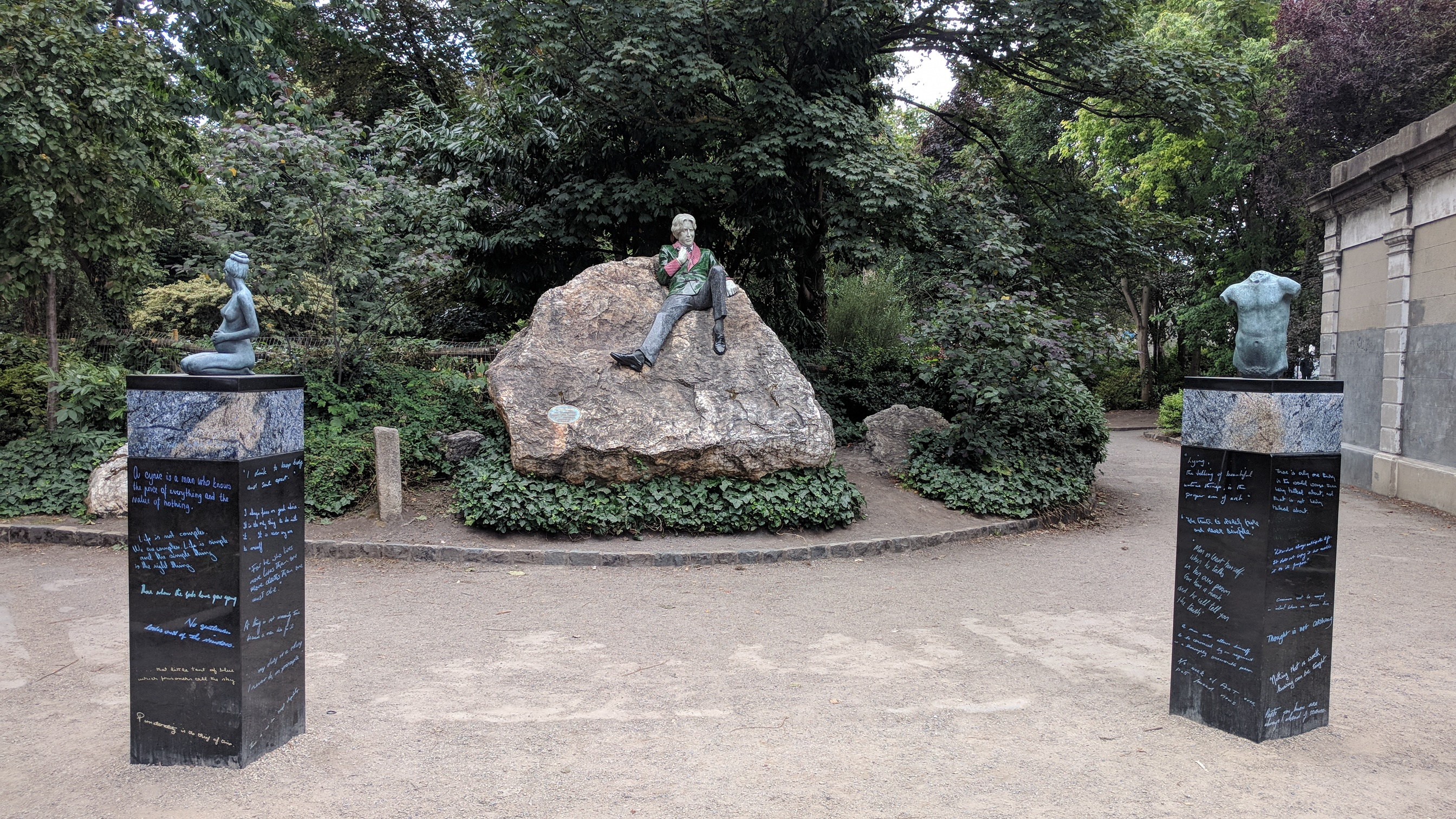
Statue and companion pieces

English sculptor Danny Osborne was commissioned by the Guinness Ireland Group to create a statue commemorating Oscar Wilde, which was unveiled in 1997, by Wilde's grandson Merlin Holland. The initial budget of IR£20,000 was later increased to IR£45,000. Since marble alone was deemed inadequate, the statue was formed from different coloured stones from three continents. The torso is of green nephrite jade from British Columbia, Canada, and pink thulite from Norway. The legs are of Norwegian Blue Pearl granite with the shoes being black Indian charnockite and finished with bronze shoelace tips. The statue also wears a Trinity College tie made from glazed porcelain, and three rings – Wilde's wedding ring and two scarabs, one for good luck, the other for bad luck.

The statue is mounted with Wilde reclining on a large quartz boulder obtained by Osborne himself from the Wicklow Mountains. The sculpture also includes two pillars flanking the boulder with one pillar having a nude pregnant representation of Wilde's wife Constance Lloyd on top. The other one has a male torso representing Dionysus, the Greek god of drama and wine, atop it. Both flanking sculptures are in bronze and granite, and both pillars have inscriptions from Wilde's poems carved onto them. The inscriptions of the quotes copy the personal handwriting of figures including Seamus Heaney, John B. Keane and Michael D. Higgins.

Three people, living at the time near to the artist's West Cork studio, posed as models for the three sculptures.

When the statue was unveiled in 1997, it was the first statue commemorating Wilde, who had died 97 years earlier. It received near unanimous praise for the materials used and for its location near his childhood home at 1, Merrion Square. In 2010, the porcelain head of Wilde had to be replaced because cracks were forming on it. The porcelain head was replaced by a new one made of white jadeite.

== Impact and significance ==
In a May 2001 article in the Irish edition of The Sunday Times Mark Keenan commented on the surprisingly long wait for a commemoration of Wilde in his native city and suggested an explanation for the delay, "... a decade ago, more conservative elements among the Dublin public may not have dared allow his city to commemorate his name." Art historian Paula Murphy agreed, saying, "It has taken nearly one hundred years for an Irish body, public or private, to risk suggesting that we might consider Oscar Wilde worthy of such commemoration. But then it has taken the same length of time for Ireland to awaken, reluctantly, to the existence of sexuality and the reality of the way in which it dictates a lifestyle." It took as long for London, where Wilde spent most of his adult life, to commemorate the dramatist: Maggi Hambling's A Conversation with Oscar Wilde was unveiled in 1998.

Discussing the work in her 2012 article "Sculpting Irishness: a discussion of Dublin's commemorative statues of Oscar Wilde and Phil Lynott" for Sculpture Journal, Sarah Smith writes:

Another distinction is the figure's facial expression, which, disrupting the realism of the figure, might be described as a rather contorted sneer. Intended by the artist to represent two antithetical sides of Wilde, one half of his face is smiling widely ... while the other bears a sombre expression ... and this divide is echoed in his posture on either side. Because of its positioning at the corner of the park on the turn of the outer pathway, the visitor to the monument sees one side of Wilde when approaching and another when walking away. One is the witty Wilde who is most often remembered in popular culture, the other the "broken man" he became following his two-year incarceration for committing homosexual acts.

Smith argues "we cannot help but read this work according to today's conventions of dress and gesture", saying:

The choice of pose for Wilde, which invokes familiar art historical and popular images of 'feminized masculinity', the use of colour for this 'colourful character' and his gaze directed at the nude male torso all coalesce with our knowledge of his homosexuality. We consequently see an overemphasis on his sexuality in this work, augmented by the nicknames given to it by Dubliners.

== See also ==
- Greek mythology in popular culture
