= Daniel Osborne =

Daniel Osborne may refer to:

- Daniel Osborne, 12th Baronet, of the Osborne baronets
- Danny Osborne (born 1949), English artist
- Dan Osborne (born 1991), cast member of The Only Way Is Essex
- Daniel Osborne, drummer in Officer Negative
- Daniel Osborne, drummer in The Pineapple Thief

== See also ==
- Daniel Osbourne (disambiguation)
- Dan Osborn (born 1975), American labor union leader activist
- Dan Osborn (baseball) (born 1946), American baseball pitcher
