= Constance Wilde =

Irish writer (1858–1898)

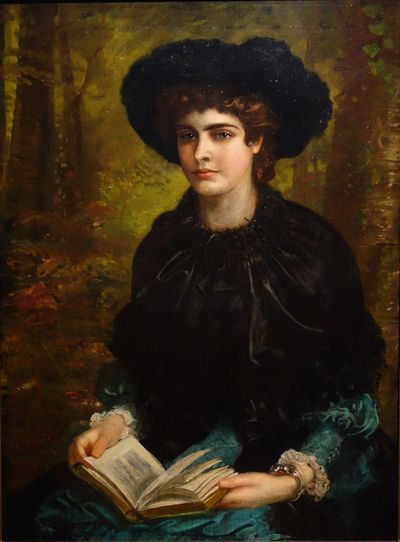
- Portrait by Louis William Desanges (1882)
- Born: 2 January 1858; London, England
- Died: 7 April 1898 (aged 40); Genoa, Italy
- Resting place: Monumental Cemetery of Staglieno
- Occupation: Author
- Spouse: Oscar Wilde (m. 1884)
- Children: Cyril Holland; Vyvyan Holland
- Relatives: Merlin Holland (grandson)
- Writing career
- Period: Victorian
- Genre: Children's stories
- Notable work: There Was Once

Constance Mary Holland (née Lloyd; 2 January 1858 – 7 April 1898), better known as Constance Wilde, was an Anglo-Irish writer, born in London. She was the wife of Irish playwright Oscar Wilde and the mother of their two sons, Cyril and Vyvyan.

== Early life and marriage ==
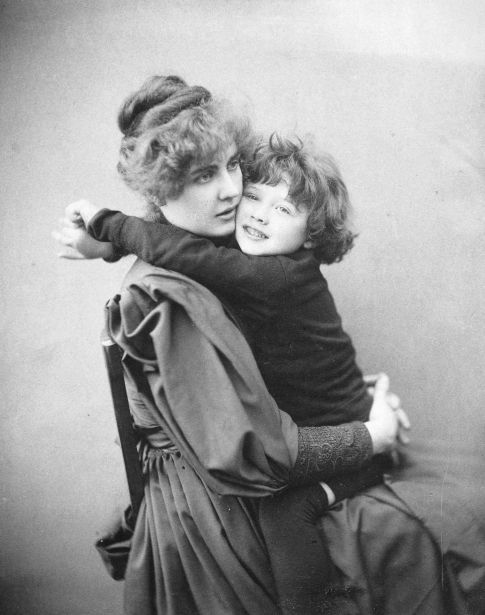
Constance with her son Cyril in 1889

The daughter of Horace Lloyd, an Anglo-Irish barrister, and Adelaide Barbara Atkinson, who had married in 1855 in Dublin, Constance Lloyd was born at her parents' home in Harewood Square, Marylebone, London. Registration of births did not become compulsory until 1875 and her parents omitted to do this.

She married Wilde at St James's Church, Paddington on 29 May 1884. Their two sons Cyril and Vyvyan were born in the next two years.

In 1888, Constance Wilde published a book based on children's stories she had heard from her grandmother, called There Was Once. She and her husband were involved in the dress reform movement.

It is unknown at what point Constance became aware of her husband's homosexual relationships. In 1891, she met his lover Lord Alfred Douglas when Wilde brought him to their home for a visit. Around this time Wilde was living more in hotels, such as the Avondale Hotel, than at their home in Tite Street. Since the birth of their second son, they had become distant.

In 1894, Constance was staying in Worthing with Oscar Wilde and started assembling a collection of epigrams called Oscariana from Wilde's works. The intention was that it be published by Arthur Humphreys, with whom she briefly fell in love that summer. The book was instead published privately the following year.

According to son Vyvyan's 1954 autobiography, the boys had a relatively happy childhood and their father was a loving parent. Richard Ellman's biography of Wilde recounted an occasion when he warned his sons about naughty boys who made their mamas cry; they asked him what happened to absent papas who made mamas cry.

After Wilde's conviction and imprisonment in 1895, Constance changed her and her sons' last name to Holland to dissociate them from his scandal. The couple never divorced, but Constance forced Wilde to give up his parental rights. She moved with her sons to Switzerland and enrolled them in an English-language boarding school in Germany. They never saw their father again. (Note: The only time they were ever told of their father was at his death in 1900. When a kindly English schoolmaster broke the news to Vyvyan, the boy was astonished. "But," he said, "I thought he died long ago.")

Constance visited Oscar in prison so she could tell him the news of his mother's death. After he had been released from prison, she refused to send him any money unless he no longer associated with Douglas.

== Illness and death ==
Constance died on 7 April 1898, five days after a surgery conducted by Luigi Maria Bossi. According to Dalya Alberge inThe Guardian, "theories [about her death] have ranged from spinal damage following a fall down stairs to syphilis caught from her husband." Also according to Alberge, Merlin Holland, grandson of Oscar Wilde,

unearthed medical evidence within private family letters, which has enabled a doctor to determine the likely cause of Constance's demise. The letters reveal symptoms nowadays associated with multiple sclerosis (Note: Multiple sclerosis was then a little-known condition.) but apparently wrongly diagnosed by her two doctors [...].

Constance sought help from two doctors. One of them was a "nerve doctor" from Heidelberg, Germany, who resorted to dubious remedies. The second doctor – Luigi Maria Bossi – conducted two operations (for uterine fibroid) in 1895 and 1898, the latter of which ultimately led to her death. Writing in the Lancet in 2015, Ashley H. Robins and Merlin Holland surmised that, "the surgery Bossi performed in December 1895 was probably an anterior vaginal wall repair to correct urinary difficulties from a presumed bladder prolapse. In retrospect, the actual problem was probably neurogenic and not structural in origin".

During the second surgery in April 1898, Bossi probably "did not attempt a hysterectomy but merely excised the tumour in a myomectomy". Shortly after the surgery Constance developed uncontrollable vomiting which led to dehydration and death. The immediate cause of death is thought to have been severe paralytic ileus, which developed either as a result of the surgery itself or of intra-abdominal sepsis. Constance is buried in Genoa, Italy, in the Monumental Cemetery of Staglieno.

A memorial statue depicting a nude pregnant Constance is included in the Oscar Wilde Memorial Sculpture in Merrion Square in Dublin.

== Portrayals ==
Two competing films about Oscar Wilde were released in the U.K. during the same year, 1960. In Oscar Wilde (film), Constance was played by Phyllis Calvert, and in The Trials of Oscar Wilde, also known as The Green Carnation, she was portrayed by Yvonne Mitchell.

Constance Wilde was portrayed by Jennifer Ehle in the 1997 film Wilde, which features Stephen Fry as Oscar Wilde.

Emily Watson portrayed Constance Wilde in the 2018 film The Happy Prince, which was written and directed by Rupert Everett, who also starred as Oscar Wilde.

In 2022, Emilia Clarke was revealed to be the lead of the biographical film An Ideal Wife by director Sophie Hyde, which will explore the sexual awakening Constance experienced when she discovered that Wilde was homosexual.

== Gallery ==
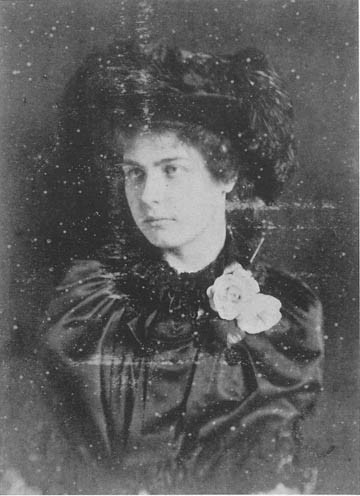
Constance Lloyd, 1882

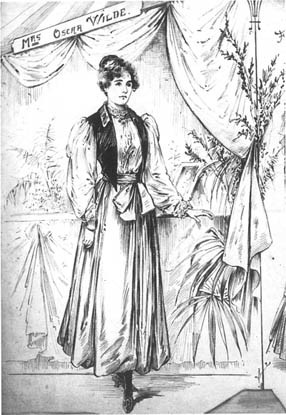
Constance at a charity flower stall held at Kensington Town Hall, April 1891

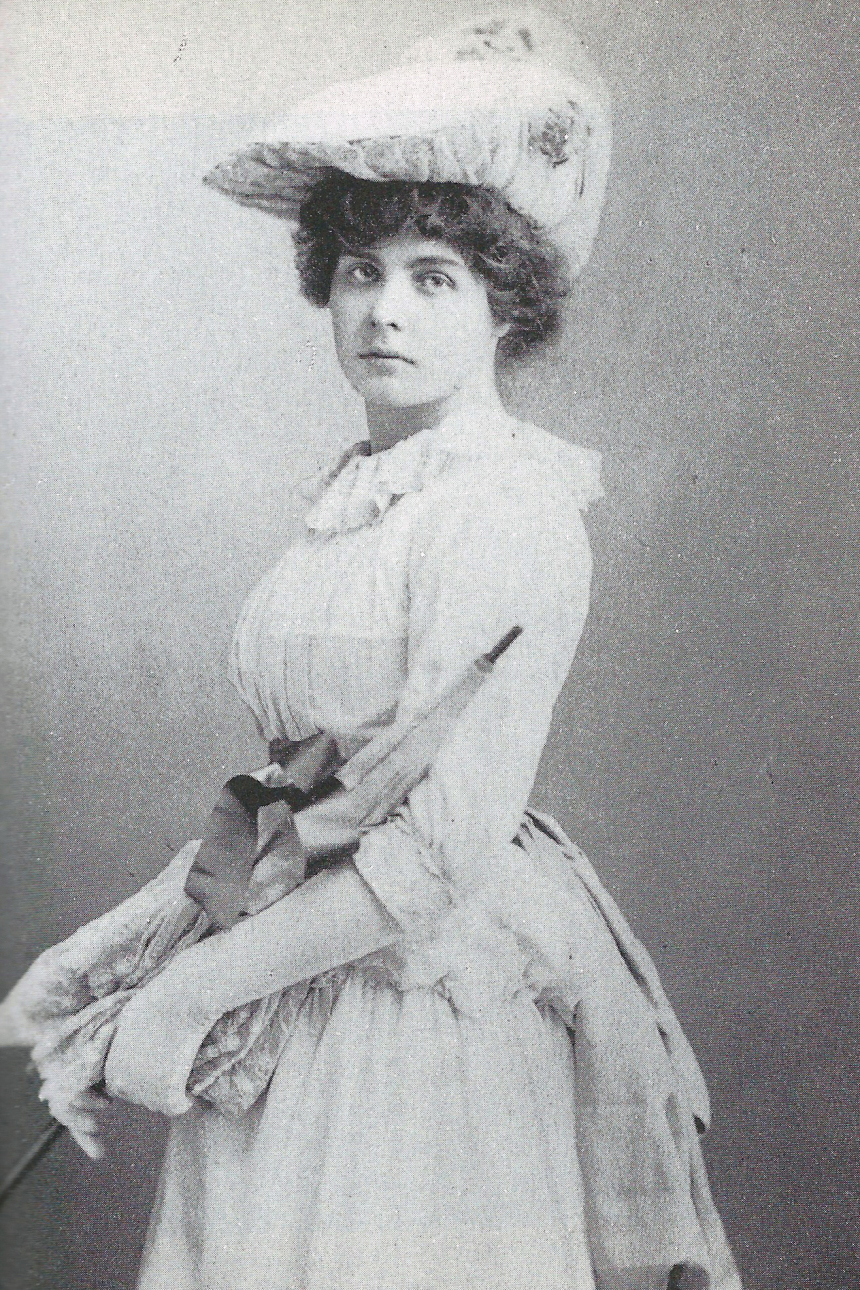
Wilde, c. 1887

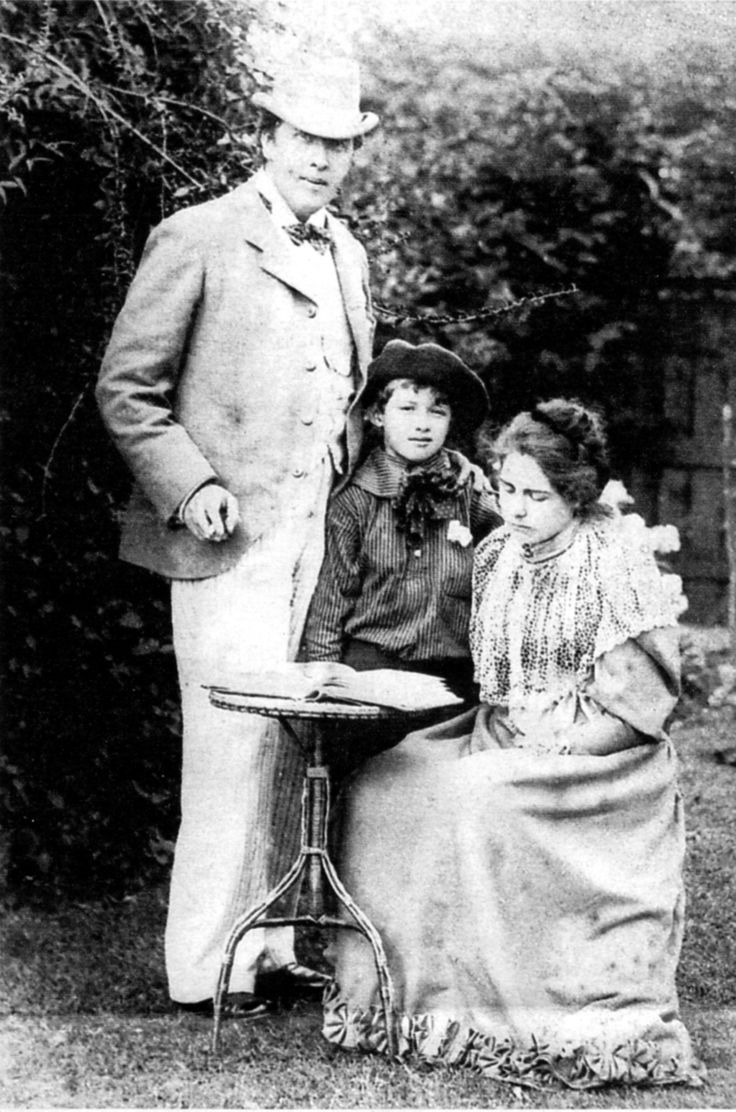
Constance, Cyril and Oscar, 1892

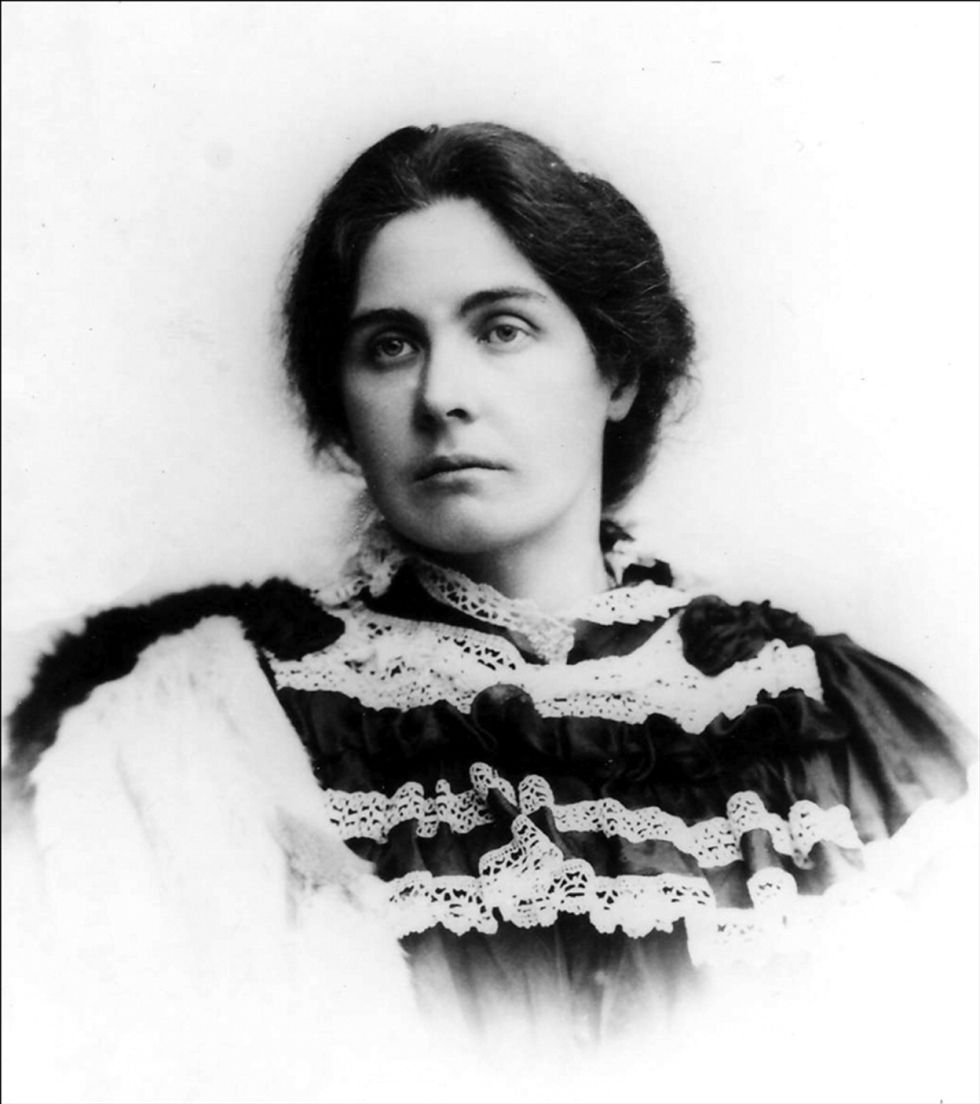
Constance in Heidelberg, 1896

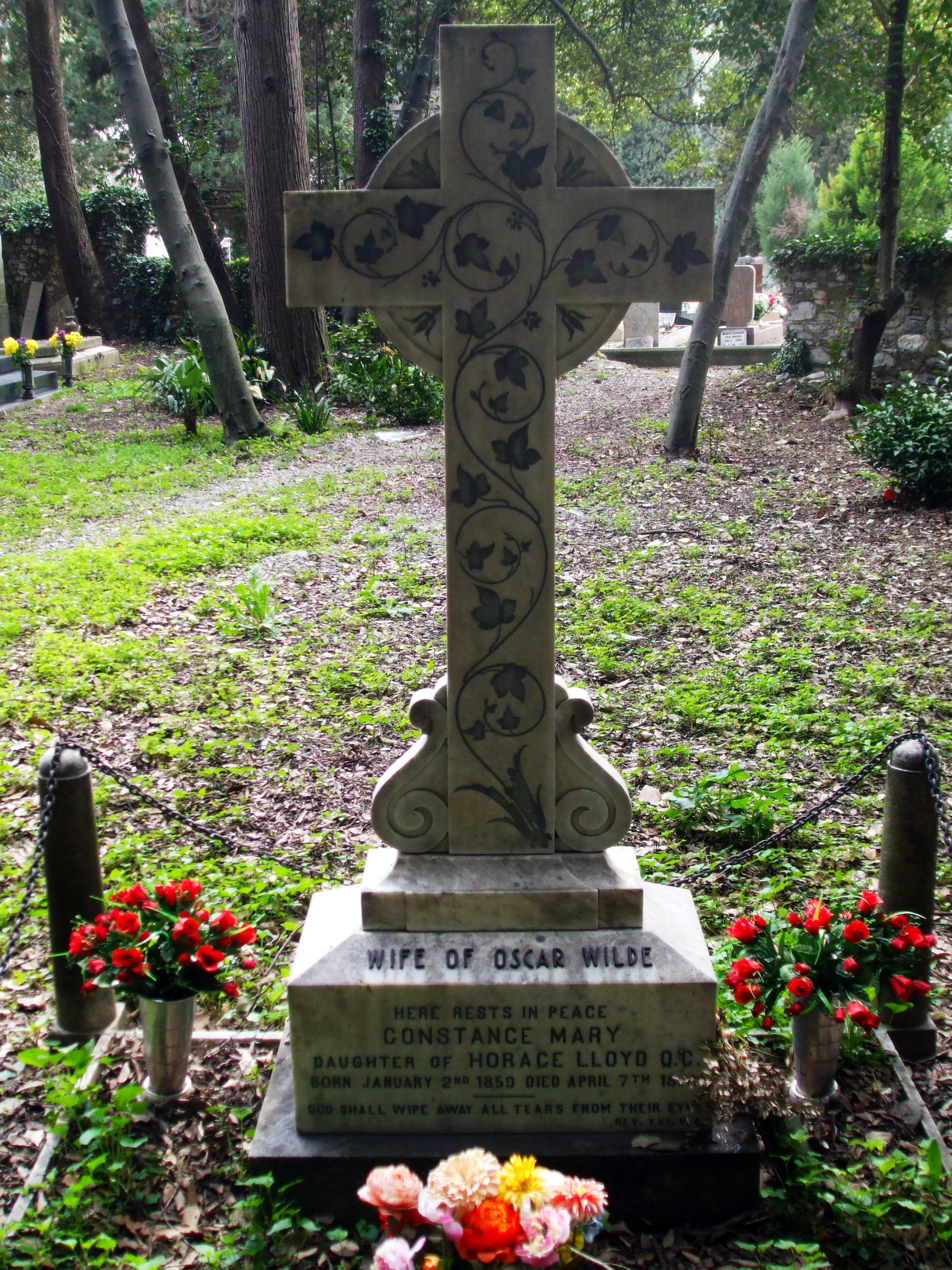
Funerary monument, Monumental Cemetery of Staglieno, Genoa

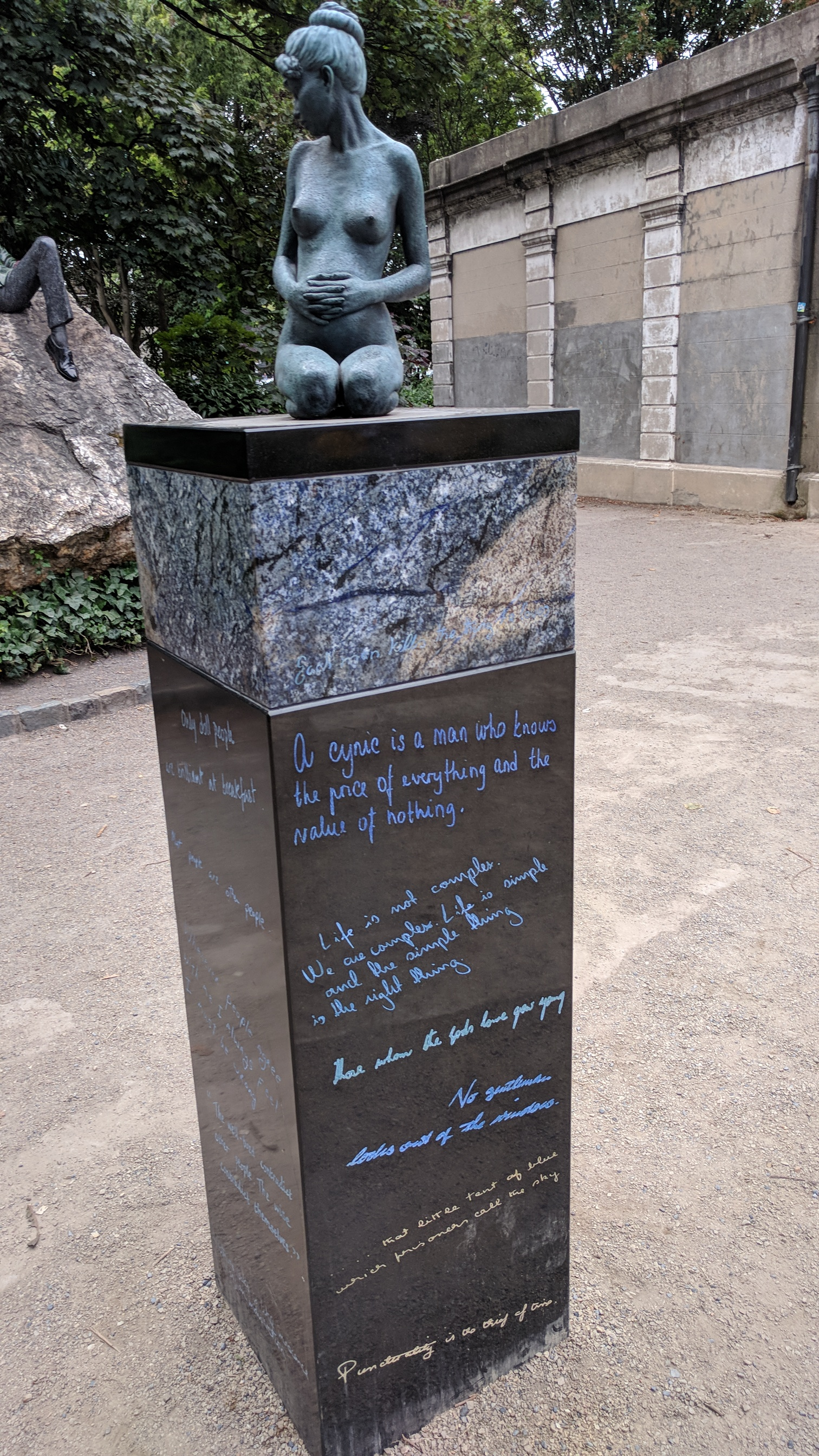
Nude, pregnant Constance (Note: A companion piece to Oscar Wilde statue in Merrion Square Park, Dublin.)
