= Wilde (film) =

1997 film by Brian Gilbert

- Theatrical release poster
- Directed by: Brian Gilbert
- Screenplay by: Julian Mitchell
- Based on: Oscar Wilde by Richard Ellmann
- Produced by: Marc Samuelson; Peter Samuelson
- Starring: Stephen Fry; Jude Law; Vanessa Redgrave; Jennifer Ehle; Gemma Jones; Judy Parfitt; Michael Sheen; Zoë Wanamaker; Tom Wilkinson
- Cinematography: Martin Fuhrer
- Edited by: Michael Bradsell
- Music by: Debbie Wiseman
- Production companies: Samuelson Productions; Dove International; NDF International; Pony Canyon; Pandora Film; Capitol Films; BBC Films
- Distributed by: PolyGram Filmed Entertainment
- Release dates: 1 September 1997 (Venice); 17 October 1997 (United Kingdom)
- Running time: 118 minutes
- Country: United Kingdom
- Language: English
- Budget: £5.6 million
- Box office: $2.2 million

Wilde is a 1997 British biographical romantic drama film directed by Brian Gilbert. The screenplay, written by Julian Mitchell, is based on Richard Ellmann's 1987 biography of Oscar Wilde. It stars Stephen Fry in the title role, with Jude Law, Vanessa Redgrave, Jennifer Ehle, Gemma Jones, Judy Parfitt, Michael Sheen, Zoë Wanamaker, and Tom Wilkinson in supporting roles.

The film premiered at the 54th Venice International Film Festival on 1 September 1997, and was theatrically released in the United Kingdom on 17 October 1997, by PolyGram Filmed Entertainment. It was praised for the performances of the cast, particularly that of Fry, who received critical acclaim and a Best Actor nomination at the 56th Golden Globe Awards. Ehle and Wanamaker were both nominated for Best Actress in a Supporting Role at the 51st British Academy Film Awards.

== Plot ==
In 1882, during his lecture tour of the United States, Oscar Wilde visits Leadville, Colorado. Despite his flamboyant personality and urbane wit, he proves to be a success with the local silver miners as he regales them with tales of Renaissance silversmith Benvenuto Cellini.

Wilde returns to London and weds Constance Lloyd. They have two sons in quick succession. While their second child is still an infant, the couple hosts a young Canadian named Robbie Ross, who seduces Wilde. Ross' love for Wilde endures. On the opening night of his play Lady Windermere's Fan, Wilde is re-introduced to the dashingly handsome and foppish poet Lord Alfred "Bosie" Douglas, whom he had met briefly the year before. The two fall into a passionate and tempestuous relationship. The hedonistic Bosie is not content to remain monogamous and frequently engages in sexual activity with rent boys while his older lover plays the role of voyeur.

Bosie's father, the Marquess of Queensberry, a violent and cruel man, objects to his son's relationship with Wilde and demeans the playwright shortly after the opening of The Importance of Being Earnest. When Wilde sues the Marquess for criminal libel, his homosexuality is publicly exposed. He is eventually tried for gross indecency and sentenced to two years' hard labour. Constance is advised by friends to go abroad and change her name to protect the children.

Prison life is grueling; the penal treadmill permanently wrecks Wilde's health. Bosie tells Robbie he will look after Wilde in some pleasant sunny place when he is released. Constance visits him in prison. She is sending Cyril to school in Germany, and she may need back surgery. He tells her he has always loved her, and that he did not know himself in the beginning. She tells him she does not want a divorce. The children love him and he is welcome to visit as long as he never sees Bosie again.

Loyal friend Ada Leverson meets Wilde when he is released from prison in May 1897, carrying the manuscript of De Profundis. He goes straight into exile, to continental Europe. He puts flowers on Constance's grave. Since she died (in April 1898) he is no longer allowed to see his children. He eventually meets with Douglas. A printed epilogue notes that they parted after three months and describes Wilde's death in Paris in November 1900 at age 46 and the fates of Bosie and Ross.

Portions of the beloved Wilde story "The Selfish Giant" are woven throughout the film, beginning when Wilde tells the story to his children, then as Constance reads the book to them and so on until Wilde almost finishes the story in a voice-over as the film nears its end.

== Cast ==
- Stephen Fry as Oscar Wilde
- Jude Law as Lord Alfred Douglas
- Vanessa Redgrave as Lady "Speranza" Wilde
- Jennifer Ehle as Constance Wilde
- Gemma Jones as Lady Queensberry
- Judy Parfitt as Lady Mount-Temple
- Michael Sheen as Robert Ross
- Zoë Wanamaker as Ada Leverson "Sphinx"
- Tom Wilkinson as The Marquess of Queensberry
- Ioan Gruffudd as John Gray
- Matthew Mills as Lionel Johnson
- Jason Morell as Ernest Dowson
- Peter Barkworth as Charles Gill
- Robert Lang as C.O. Humphreys
- Philip Locke as Judge
- David Westhead as Edward Carson
- Jack Knight as Cyril Wilde
- Jackson Leach as Cyril Wilde, aged 4
- Laurence Owen as Vyvyan Wilde
- Benedict Sandiford as Alfred Wood
- Mark Letheren as Charles Parker
- Michael Fitzgerald as Alfred Taylor
- Orlando Bloom as Rentboy

== Production ==
In a featurette on the film's DVD release, producer Marc Samuelson confesses casting Stephen Fry in the title role was both a blessing and a problem. Everyone agreed he was physically perfect for the part and more than capable of carrying it off, but the fact he was not a major presence in films made it difficult for them to obtain financing for the project.

In the DVD commentary, Fry, who is gay, admitted he was nervous about the love scenes with his heterosexual co-stars. He says Jude Law, Michael Sheen, and Ioan Gruffudd were quick to put him at ease. Orlando Bloom made his film debut in this film, with a brief appearance as a rentboy.

Scenes were filmed at Knebworth House in Hertfordshire; Lulworth Cove, Studland Bay, and Swanage Pier in Dorset; Houghton Lodge in Hampshire; Luton Hoo in Bedfordshire; Magdalen College in Oxford; Lincoln's Inn in Holborn and Somerset House in the Strand.

Brothers Marc and Peter Samuelson produced the film in association with Dove International, NDF International, Pony Canyon, Pandora Film, Capitol Films, and BBC Films.

== Release ==
Wilde had its world premiere at the 54th Venice International Film Festival on 1 September 1997, and was released in the United Kingdom by PolyGram Filmed Entertainment on 17 October 1997. In February 1998, it was announced that Sony Pictures Classics acquired North American distribution rights to the film, and set it for a 1 May 1998 release.

=== Home media ===
Altitude Film Distribution released the film on Blu-ray in the United Kingdom on 14 December 2015. Sony Pictures later released it on Blu-ray in the United States on 14 June 2022.

== Reception ==
=== Critical response ===
On the review aggregator website Rotten Tomatoes, 72% of 50 critics' reviews are positive, with an average rating of 6.6/10. The website's consensus reads: "Wilde can't hope to communicate the entirety of its subject's fascinating life or outsize talent, but Stephen Fry's stellar performance offers abundant compensation." Metacritic, which uses a weighted average, assigned the film a score of 70 out of 100, based on 26 critics, indicating "generally favorable" reviews.

Janet Maslin of The New York Times called the film "a broad but effectively intimate portrait" and lauded Fry's performance, writing that he "looks uncannily like Wilde and presents a mixture of superciliousness and vulnerability. Though the film suffers a case of quip-lash thanks to its tireless Wildean witticisms, Mr. Fry's warmly sympathetic performance finds the gentleness beneath the wit." Maslin concluded her review by stating, "Wilde and Mr. Fry fare better at shaping an arch, vivid impersonation than in telling a cautionary tale."

Kevin Thomas of the Los Angeles Times opined that "Wilde has found a perfect Oscar in the formidably talented Stephen Fry, who brings an uncanny physical resemblance to the Victorian playwright along with a profound grasp of the great wit's psyche" and described the film as "a lustrous period piece with a high degree of authenticity in decor and costume." Thomas also stated, "A work of superior craftsmanship, Wilde moves quite briskly, and the idea of approaching an unconventional life with a traditional narrative style pays off."

Roger Ebert of the Chicago Sun-Times said the film "has the good fortune to star Stephen Fry, a British author, actor and comedian who looks a lot like Wilde and has many of the same attributes: He is very tall, he is somewhat plump, he is gay, he is funny and he makes his conversation into an art. That he is also a fine actor is important, because the film requires him to show many conflicting aspects of Wilde's life ... [He] brings a depth and gentleness to the role."

Mick LaSalle of the San Francisco Chronicle called it "a sympathetic and, for the most part, nicely realized look into the private life of the flamboyant author" and commented, "Stephen Fry has the title role, and it's hard to imagine a more appropriate actor ... In the last third, the film derails somewhat by turning preachy ... While [it] captures its subject's singular charm, it ultimately doesn't do justice to his complexity."

In the San Francisco Examiner, David Armstrong said the film "benefits from its lush period costumes and settings but gains even more from an accomplished cast of British film and stage actors ... Stephen Fry ... slips right under the skin of the title character [and] presents a multidimensional portrait of a complex man ... However, Wilde, like Wilde, is flawed. Gilbert's direction is sturdy but uninspired, and Ehle's part is underwritten. To her credit, Ehle movingly conveys the sad frustration that Wilde implanted in his lonely wife; but Ehle has to do the work, playing her feelings on her face, with little help from Julian Mitchell's screenplay."

Derek Elley of Variety observed, "Brian Gilbert, till now only a journeyman director, brings to the picture most of the qualities that were memorably absent in his previous costumer, Tom & Viv – visual fluency, deep-seated emotion and first rate playing from his cast."

In the Evening Standard, Alexander Walker called the film "an impressive and touching work of intelligence, compassion and tragic stature" and said Stephen Fry "returns to the top of the class with a dominating screen performance."

In his review in Time Out New York, Andrew Johnston observed that "The first hour – filled with sharp humor and steamy gay sex – delivers a thoroughly modern portrait of Wilde, and Fry (who in costume bears an astonishing resemblance to the writer) plays him with a pitch-perfect combination of smugness and warmth."

=== Box office ===
The film opened on 15 screens in the United Kingdom and grossed £146,495 ($237,128) in its opening weekend for a per-screen average of £9,766 ($15,803). It grossed $2,158,755 in the United States and Canada.

=== Accolades ===
- Golden Globe Award for Best Actor – Motion Picture Drama (Stephen Fry, Nominee)
- BAFTA Award for Best Actress in a Supporting Role (Jennifer Ehle and Zoë Wanamaker, Nominees)
- Evening Standard British Film Award for Most Promising Newcomer (Jude Law, Nominee)
- Evening Standard British Film Award for Best Technical/Artistic Achievement (Maria Djurkovic, Nominee)
- GLAAD Media Award for Outstanding Film (Nominee)
- Satellite Award for Best Actor - Motion Picture Drama (Fry, Nominee)
- Seattle International Film Festival Golden Space Needle Award for Best Actor (Fry, Winner)
- Ivor Novello Award for Best Score (Debbie Wiseman, Winner)

== See also ==
- The Happy Prince, a 2018 film that focuses on Wilde's life after his release from prison.
