= David Daniels (countertenor) =

American countertenor (born 1966)

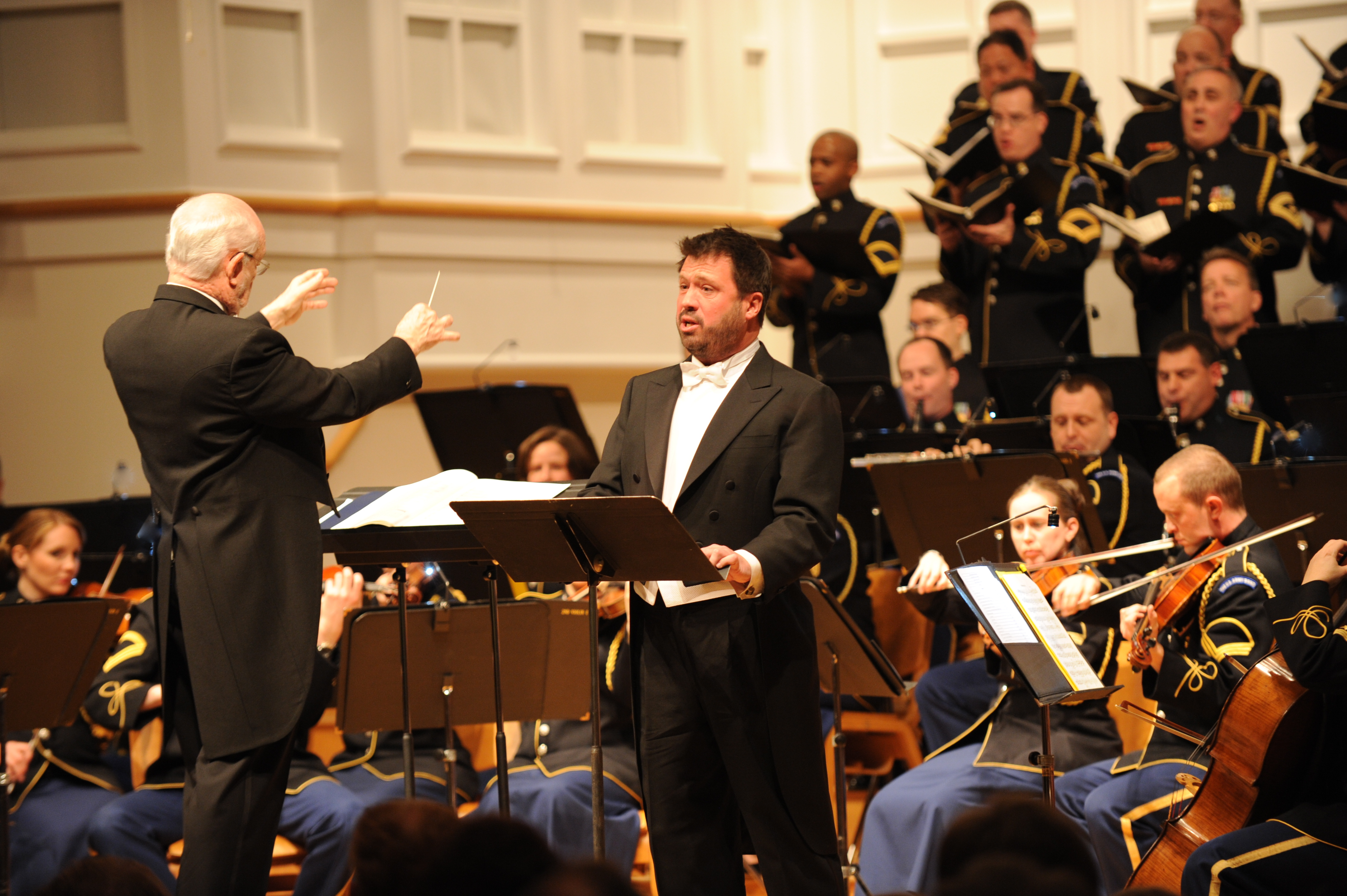
- Daniels in concert with the U. S. Army Chorus and Orchestra
- Born: March 12, 1966 (age 60); Spartanburg, South Carolina
- Education: University of Michigan
- Years active: 1992–2018
- Spouse: Scott Walters
- Website: www.danielssings.com

David Daniels (born March 12, 1966) is an American countertenor and convicted rapist. He was one of the most prominent classical stars to face criminal charges during the MeToo movement and pled guilty to sexual assault in 2023.

== Early life and education ==
Daniels was born in Spartanburg, South Carolina, the son of two singing teachers. He began to sing as a boy soprano, moving to tenor as his voice matured. His father, baritone Perry Daniels, was one of the pre-eminent members of the performing faculty during each summer at Brevard Music Center, linked to the School of Music at Converse College in Spartanburg; his mother was an operatic soprano. Daniels studied music at the Cincinnati College Conservatory of Music. Dissatisfied with his achievements as a tenor, Daniels switched to singing countertenor during graduate studies at the University of Michigan School of Music, Theatre & Dance (Master of Music in 1992) under the guidance of his teacher, George Shirley.

== Career ==
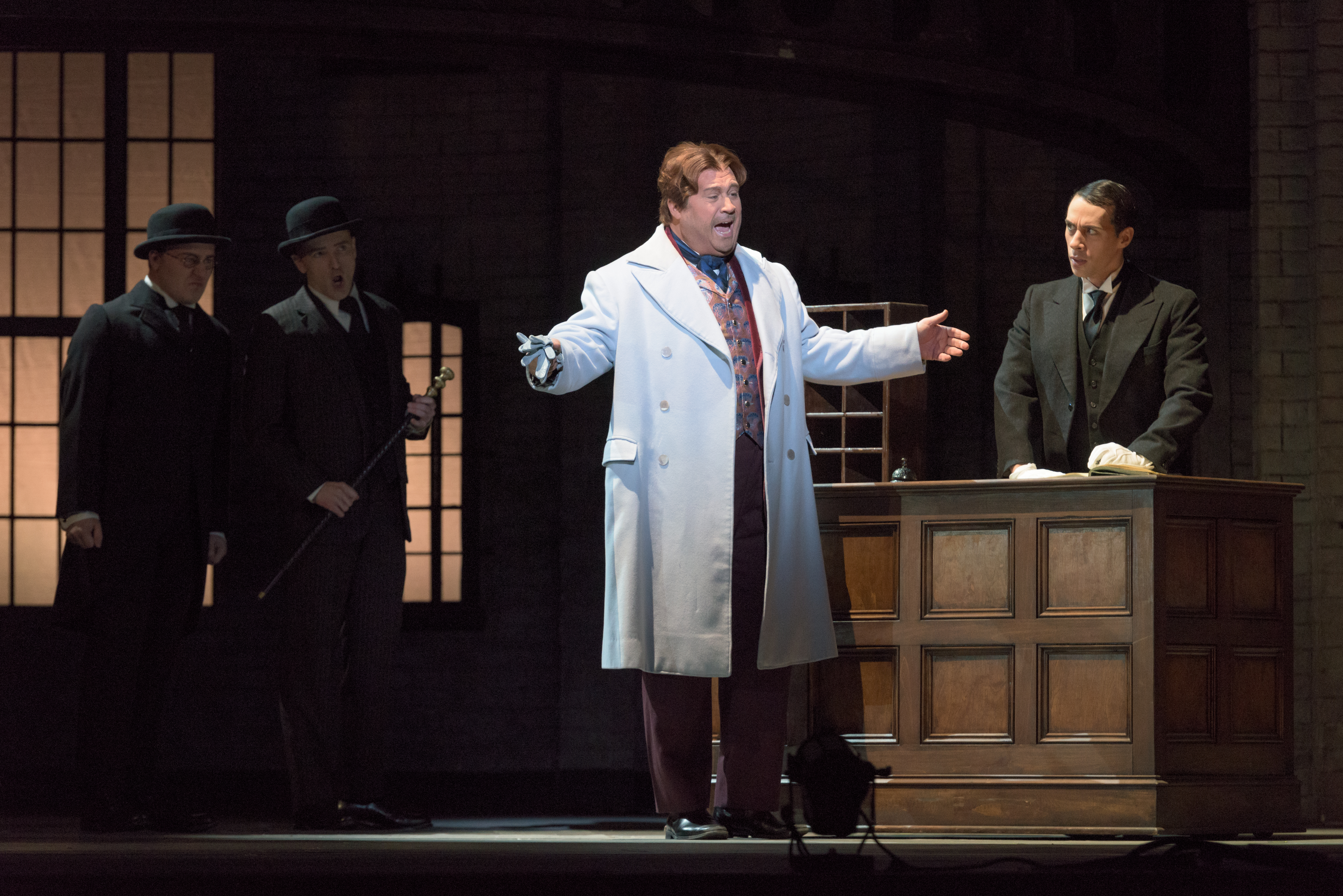
Daniels as Oscar Wilde in Oscar at Opera Philadelphia, 2015

Daniels made his professional singing debut in 1992. In 1997, he won the Richard Tucker Award. In 1999, he made his debut with the Metropolitan Opera, as Sesto in Handel's Giulio Cesare.

His repertoire has grown to include other major Handel roles, including Arsace in the comedy Partenope at the Lyric Opera of Chicago and San Francisco Opera in 2014; the title role in Tamerlano; and Arsamene in Xerxes. At the Bavarian State Opera in Munich, Daniels played the title roles in Rinaldo and Orlando, as well as David in Saul. He interpreted Ottone in Monteverdi's L'incoronazione di Poppea and recorded the role of Nero in the same work; it was also his debut role at San Francisco Opera in 1998. In Vivaldi's opera Bajazet, he sang the role of Tamerlano. In 2013, he sang the title role in Giulio Cesare at the Metropolitan Opera.

Daniels has also branched out from the baroque roles usually associated with countertenors to include Oberon in Benjamin Britten's A Midsummer Night's Dream at the Metropolitan Opera, and as Orfeo in Gluck's Orfeo ed Euridice at the Royal Opera House, Covent Garden. In July 2013 he created the role of Oscar Wilde in Oscar at the Santa Fe Opera, written for him by Theodore Morrison; he then sang Oscar again in Opera Philadelphia's production in 2015. The same year he made his debut at the Vienna State Opera as Trinculo in Thomas Adès' opera The Tempest.

From fall 2015 to March 2020, Daniels joined the faculty of his alma mater, the University of Michigan School of Music, Theatre & Dance, as Professor of Music in Voice.

== Sexual assault guilty plea ==
In the fall of 2018, Daniels was placed on leave by the University of Michigan School of Music, Theatre & Dance after allegations of sexual assault. Following the allegations, a second student – a countertenor who studied with Daniels at the University of Michigan (U-M) – accused Daniels of sexual assault, bringing civil lawsuits against both Daniels and the University of Michigan, in October 2018. In response to the second lawsuit, Daniels filed a counter-claim, but his and his accusers' lawsuits were mutually dismissed. Daniels's accusers' Title IX lawsuit against the University of Michigan for failing to protect them and other students from Daniels was settled in 2023.

The San Francisco Opera removed Daniels from its 2019 production of Orlando "after considerable deliberation given the serious allegations of sexual assault". In January 2019, Texas filed charges of second-degree sexual assault against Daniels and his husband, who were then arrested in Ann Arbor, Michigan. On March 26, 2020, at the recommendation of U-M President Mark Schlissel and in a unanimous vote by the Board of Regents, Daniels was dismissed from U-M effective immediately and without severance pay. Daniels filed a federal lawsuit against the University of Michigan three years after being fired, but the case was dismissed by U.S. District Judge Sean Cox. The judge also dismissed Daniels' lawsuit against a student who had accused Daniels of sexual misconduct.

On August 4, 2023, both Daniels and his husband, conductor Scott Walters, pleaded guilty to sexually assaulting another singer in Houston in 2010. As part of the plea agreement, both will be spared prison time. Daniels will face eight years of probation, a lifetime requirement to register as a sex offender and an order that he refrain from contact with the singer he assaulted.

== Personal life ==
Daniels married conductor Scott Walters at Dumbarton House in Washington, DC, on June 21, 2014; the ceremony was conducted by United States Supreme Court Justice Ruth Bader Ginsburg.
