= Peter Samuelson =

American-British TV and film producer

- Born: 16 October 1951 (age 74); London, England, UK
- Occupation: Film producer
- Years active: 1971–present
- Children: 2

Peter Samuelson (born 16 October 1951) is an American and British TV and film producer known for films such as Revenge of the Nerds and Arlington Road.

== Early life ==
Samuelson was born in London, England, and has a master's degree in English literature from the University of Cambridge. Marc Samuelson is his brother. G. B. Samuelson is his grandfather. Emma Samms is his cousin.

== Career ==
Samuelson's career in the film industry started in the early 1970s.

From 1990 to 2006, Peter Samuelson and Marc Samuelson ran Samuelson Productions.

Samuelson served on the initial three-person advisory board for Jeff Skoll's Participant Productions.

=== Producer and executive producer ===
- 1660 Vine (2022) (Executive Producer)
- Foster Boy (2019) (Producer)
- Man in the Chair (2006) (Executive Producer)
- The Last Time (2006) (Producer)
- Stormbreaker (2006) (Producer)
  - aka Alex Rider: Operation Stormbreaker (USA)
- Things To Do Before You're 30 (2006) (Producer)
- Chromophobia (2005) (Executive Producer)
- Need (2005) (Producer)
- The Libertine (2004) (Executive Producer)
- The Pact (2002) (TV) (Executive Producer)
- The Gathering (2002) (Producer)
- Gabriel & Me (2001) (Producer)
- Guest House Paradiso (1999) (Executive Producer)
- Arlington Road (1999) (Producer)
- The Commissioner (1998) (co-producer)
  - aka Der Commissioner – Im Zentrum der Macht (Germany)
- This Is The Sea (1997) (Executive Producer)
- Wilde (1997) (Producer)
  - aka Oscar Wilde (Germany)
- Dog's Best Friend (1997) (TV) (Executive Producer)
- Tom & Viv (1994) (Producer)
- Playmaker (1994) (Producer)
  - aka Private Teacher (Philippines)
- Turk 182! (1985) (Executive Producer)
- Revenge of the Nerds (1984) (Producer)
- A Man, a Woman, and a Bank (1979) (Producer)

=== Production manager ===
- Shoot the Sun Down (1981) (Associate Producer & Production Manager)
- High Velocity (1976) (Production Manager)
- The Return of the Pink Panther (1975) (Production Manager & uncredited acting part of the Clothing thief)
- One by One (1975) (Production Manager)
  - aka Quick and the Dead (USA)
- Le Mans (1971) (Assistant Production Manager)

== Non-film projects ==
In 1982 Samuelson and his cousin, actress Emma Samms, were inspired by a boy battling an inoperable brain tumor, and started the Los Angeles based non-profit organization Starlight Children's Foundation which brings entertainment and technology to children in hospitals.

In 1990, Samuelson brought together leaders including Steven Spielberg and General Norman Schwarzkopf to create the STARBRIGHT Foundation, a charity dedicated to developing media and technology-based programs to educate and empower children to cope with the medical, emotional and social challenges of their illnesses. Five years later, they launched the interactive social network Starbright World that helps seriously ill children meet and develop relationships with peers through video, sound, text, and avatar based communication.

In 2004, Starlight and STARBRIGHT completed a formal merger and became the Starlight Starbright Children's Foundation, where Samuelson served for 7 years as the international chairman of the organization.

In 1999 Samuelson co-founded FirstStar.org to propel foster youth in the US and UK into college and better futures. Partnered with 15 major universities, First Star's college prep academies enable 90% of the graduates to continue onto post-secondary education.

In 2005 Samuelson developed and patented the design for an affordable single-user homeless shelter on wheels, passing the rights to a new charaity, Everyone Deserves a Roof, and naming the units EDARs.

In 2014, Samuelson founded ASPIRE, the Academy for Social Purpose in Responsible Entertainment, a national 501(c)(3) charity that teaches media for social change to undergraduate and graduate students across the university, regardless of their major. ASPIRE’s new kind of digital literacy was first piloted at UCLA.

Samuelson was the first managing director of the Media Institute for Social Change (MISC) at the University of Southern California.
