= Julian Rushton =

English musicologist (born 1941)

Julian Gordon Rushton (born 22 May 1941) is an English musicologist, born in Cambridge. He has contributed the entry on Mozart in The New Grove Dictionary of Opera and several other articles in The New Grove Dictionary of Music and Musicians and other reference works. He has written a critical study of the style of Hector Berlioz and was involved in critical editions of that composer's works. In 1999, he published an analysis of Elgar's Enigma Variations. His book Coffee with Mozart (2007) has been translated into German. He also wrote Mozart (The Master Musicians, 2006) and Mozart: An Extraordinary Life (2006). In addition to his 1983 work The Musical Language of Berlioz, he wrote The Music of Berlioz (OUP, 2001) as well as several articles on Mozart, Berlioz, and Elgar. He was General Editor of Cambridge Music Handbooks (c. 60 volumes), contributing Berlioz, Roméo et Juliette and Elgar, 'Enigma' Variations. He has edited works by Charpentier, Berlioz (four volumes of the New Berlioz Edition), Elgar, and Vaughan Williams. He is editor the Cambridge Berlioz Encyclopedia (2018). He was for 25 years chair of the Editorial Committee of Musica Britannica.

Rushton studied at the Guildhall School of Music and Drama in London, at Trinity College, Cambridge under Raymond Leppard, and received a doctorate (DPhil.) from Magdalen College, Oxford, supervised by J. A. Westrup, awarded in 1970. His thesis was on French tragic opera in the period dominated by Gluck (c. 1774–1789). He taught at the University of East Anglia and then at Cambridge, holding a fellowship at King's College from 1974 until 1981, before being appointed to the West Riding Chair of Music at the University of Leeds. He retired in 2005.
