= Oscar (opera) =

Opera by Theodore Morrison

- Opera by Theodore Morrison
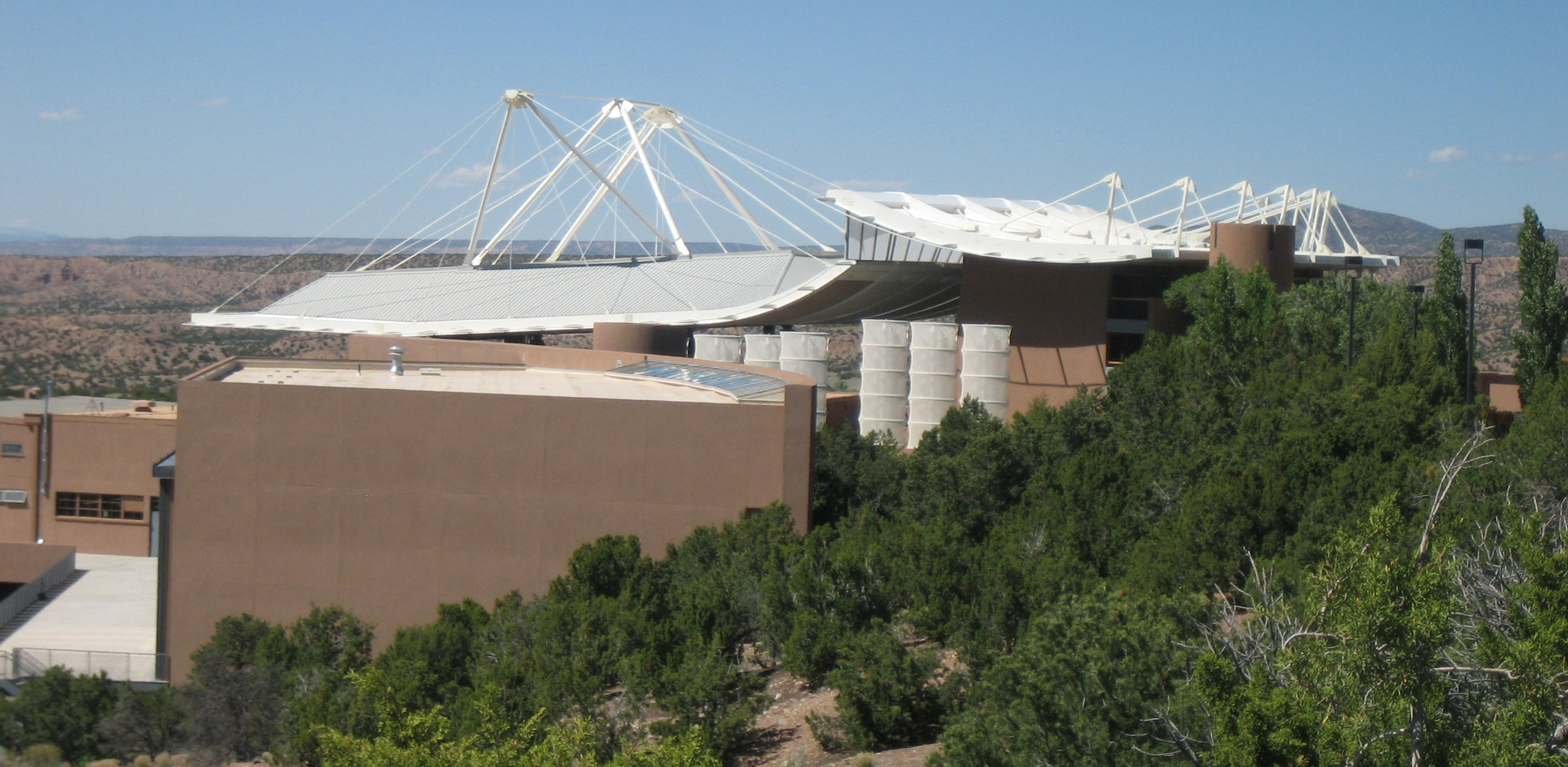
- Santa Fe Opera, venue of the opera's premiere
- Librettist: Theodore Morrison; John Cox
- Premiere: 27 July 2013; Santa Fe Opera, Santa Fe, New Mexico

Oscar is an American opera in two acts, with music by composer Theodore Morrison and a libretto by Morrison and English opera director John Cox. The opera, Morrison's first, is based on the life of Oscar Wilde, focused on his trial and imprisonment in Reading Gaol. It was a co-commission and co-production between Santa Fe Opera and Opera Philadelphia (formerly the Opera Company of Philadelphia). This work received its world premiere at the Santa Fe Opera on 27 July 2013. Opera Philadelphia first presented the revised version of the opera on 6 February 2015.

The genesis of the opera resulted from a 2004 meeting in London between Morrison and Cox, after the premiere of Morrison's James Joyce song cycle, Chamber Music, which he wrote for countertenor David Daniels, a former student of his. Upon learning that Morrison had never composed an opera, but wished to write one for Daniels, Cox encouraged that idea. This led to correspondence between Cox and Morrison, and an agreement to collaborate on an opera based on the subject of Oscar Wilde. Cox and Morrison had each read the biography of Wilde by Richard Ellmann, and settled on a plan for co-authorship of an opera libretto based on the writings of Oscar Wilde and his contemporaries, with Walt Whitman serving as a chorus speaking from the realm of immortality. The opera used Wilde's poem The Ballad of Reading Gaol, documents, letters, conversations and remarks by Wilde's contemporaries as source material for the libretto. Cox also consulted Merlin Holland, the grandson of Oscar Wilde and a scholar on Oscar Wilde.

== Roles ==
Role	Voice type	Premiere cast, 27 July 2013 (Conductor: Evan Rogister)	Cast for premiere of revised version, 6 February 2015 (Conductor: Evan Rogister)
Oscar Wilde	countertenor	David Daniels	David Daniels
Walt Whitman	baritone	Dwayne Croft	Dwayne Croft
Ada Leverson	soprano	Heidi Stober	Heidi Stober
Frank Harris	tenor	William Burden	William Burden
Bosie (Lord Alfred Douglas)	Non-singing role	Reed Luplau (dancer)	Reed Luplau (dancer)
Mr Justice Sir Alfred Wills, Trial judge	bass	Kevin Burdette	Wayne Tigges
Henry B. Isaacson, Governor of Reading Gaol	bass	Kevin Burdette	Wayne Tigges
Detective No. 1 (Inspector Littlechild)	tenor	Aaron Pegram	Joseph Gaines
Detective No. 2 (Inspector Kearley)	bass-baritone	Benjamin Sieverding	Benjamin Sieverding
Hotel Managers	baritone	Ricardo Rivera	Ricardo Rivera
Leggatt, A butler	bass	Patrick Guetti	Frank Mitchell
Bailiff	tenor	Yoni Rose	Toffer Mihalka
Jury Foreman	baritone	Reuben Lillie	Daniel Schwartz
Prison Warder No. 1	tenor	Aaron Pegram	Joseph Gaines
Prison Warder No. 2	bass-baritone	Benjamin Sieverding	Benjamin Sieverding
Chaplain	tenor	Christian Sanders	Roy Hage
Infirmary Patient No. 1	tenor	David Blalock	Jarrett Ott
Infirmary Patient No. 2	bass-baritone	Benjamin Sieverding	Thomas Shivone
Warder Thomas Martin	baritone	Ricardo Rivera	Ricardo Rivera

== Synopsis ==
Time: 1895–1897
Place: London and Reading Gaol

(Note: this synopsis refers to the original version of the opera. Changes which appear in the revised version are noted.)

=== Act 1 ===
Prologue: In the regions of Immortality

Walt Whitman introduces himself. He tells of meeting Oscar Wilde in the 1880s when Wilde was lecturing across America. He then describes what happens to Wilde in the years leading up to his conviction. Wilde is present and sings of "Sorrow", concluding that "what lies before you is my past".

[Revised version: After the conductor enters the pit, the opera begins with a "curtain speech" by Wilde at the opening night of his 1892 play Lady Windermere's Fan at the height of his fame.]

Scene 1: In the streets of London, 1895

During Wilde's second trial, he is out on bail and looking for a hotel room. Bosie has left the country, but is present in Wilde's imagination (portrayed silently by a dancer). Bosie's father, the Marquess of Queensberry, has hired two detectives to warn hoteliers against providing lodging to Wilde. When Wilde arrives at a hotel, its manager refuses Wilde a room. This recurs at two other hotels, each somewhat more shabby than the others. Alone on the street corner, Bosie comes forward, and they say goodbye. Bosie leaves, whilst Wilde remains alone.

Scenes 2 – 7: In the nursery at the home of the Leversons

Wilde arrives to a welcome from Ada Leverson. She expresses her feeling that Wilde should ignore Bosie's advice, given out of fear for his father, that he should stay for the sentencing rather than flee to France. However, she tells him that their friend Frank Harris has a plan to help him escape and will arrive soon. Meanwhile, as they talk of drink, in Wilde's imagination, Bosie enters, dressed as a waiter. Bosie and Wilde dance, until Wilde is left alone crying out "Bosie!" – and then he quickly returns to reality.

Leggatt, the servant, announces Harris' arrival. Harris and Leverson talk about Wilde, and of how Walt Whitman, "the noblest of Americans", was left in poverty in old age and supported by the English, but Harris notes: "England will not save Oscar Wilde!" At that, Wilde enters, and Harris describes his plan to transport Wilde to France via yacht, to escape the verdict. Wilde is reluctant, but Leverson and Harris think that they have persuaded him, and tell Leggatt to send a message to the yacht owner. As they leave, Bosie appears and dances before Wilde, but disappears as Wilde comes back to reality. When Harris and Leverson return, Wilde declares that he cannot flee: "All that is not for me, for I know that it is nobler and more beautiful to stay for this Cause". Sadly, Harris leaves, pledging his support.

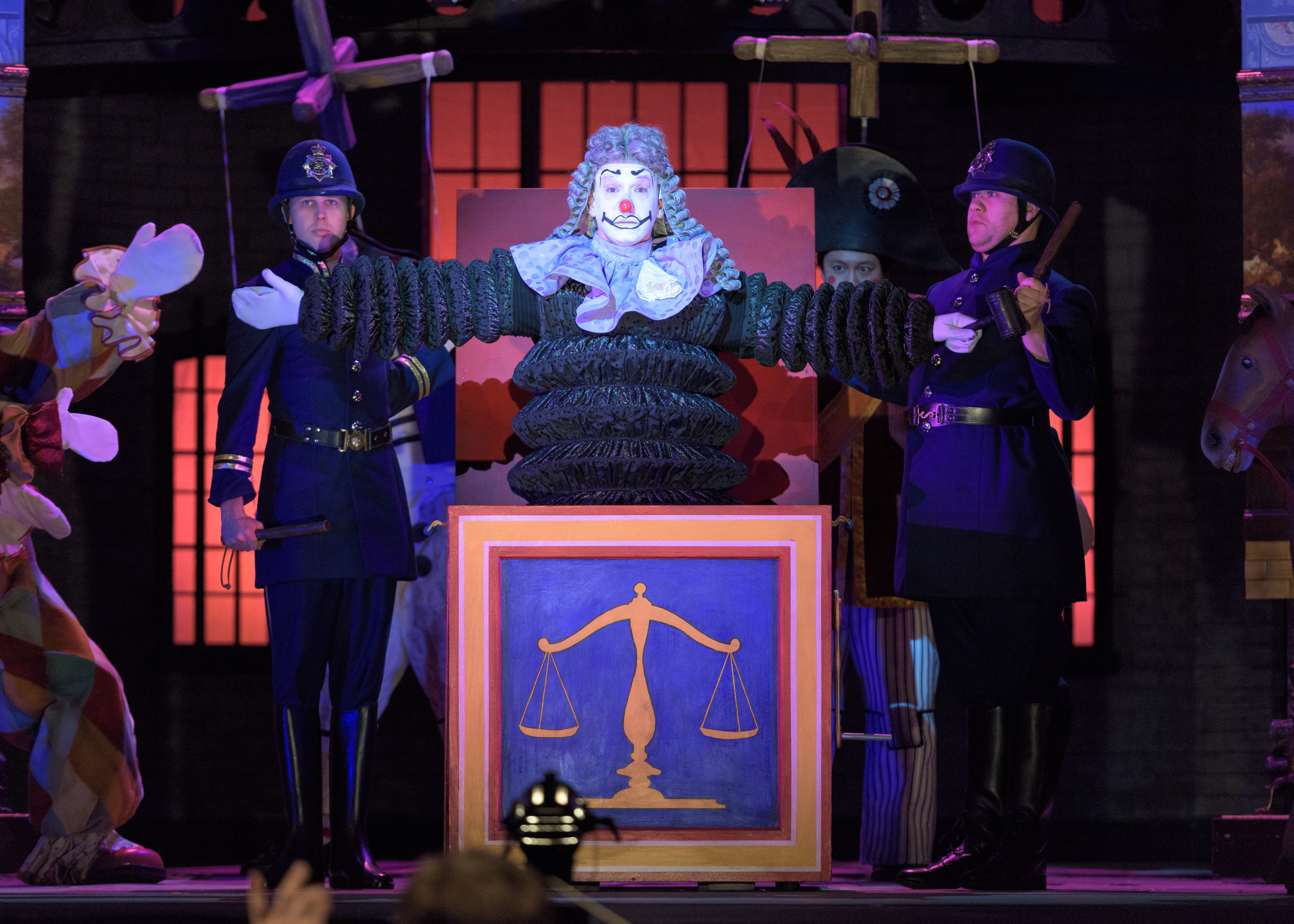
A scene from the end of the first act, in the 2015 Opera Philadelphia production

Whitman appears alone, asking "Why is it that a man runs to his own ruin?". Wilde is revealed at his desk, writing a letter to Bosie. Whitman reads the letter out loud as Bosie appears, who dances simultaneously. Whitman then leaves and Bosie remains standing as Wilde extols Bosie's virtues: "You are the atmosphere of beauty through which I see life; you are the incarnation of all lovely things....My sweet rose!" At that moment, breaking into Wilde's fantasy, Queensberry's men enter and order Bosie to leave England, and torment Wilde, who reacts with fury: "the Oscar Wilde rule is to shoot on sight!" Wilde attacks the detectives, then his fantasy subsides and he is in despair.

In the trial scene, the nursery transforms into the courtroom and the toys become the personages at the trial. Wilde is convicted of gross indecency and sentenced to two years' hard labour.

=== Act 2 ===
Scene 1: Inside Reading Gaol

Whitman is on stage, asking the audience to identify with the prisoners and their plight. Wilde appears in prison, in chains. The prison governor, Isaacson, and Quinton, the prison doctor (portrayed by the dancer) appear. Isaacson tells Wilde the rules of the institution. Wilde is examined and made to dress in prison garb, taken to his cell, and given the crank which he is obliged to keep turning uselessly. In another fantasy sequence, Wilde imagines that the doctor is Bosie, but when revealed, Bosie quickly vanishes.

Scene 2: The prison chapel

As the prisoners are about to sing a hymn, Wilde is seated. Midway, the prison chaplain, approaches Wilde and insults him. Trying to stand up, Wilde collapses and hits his head, which causes him to be taken to the infirmary. The rebellious prisoners are subdued and returned to their cells.

Scene 3: The infirmary

Whitman advises Wilde to forget about the pain of the moment. Wilde lies alongside two other prisoners. One prisoner speaks kindly to Wilde, who is touched, as it is his first sympathetic human conduct since arriving in the gaol. Martin, the warder (whom the first prisoner describes as "the only one who's human"), arrives to treat the patients. Martin asks Wilde a few literary questions. The two prisoners and Martin sing a music hall number, "Burlington Bertie", in which Wilde joins at the final lines. After Martin leaves, the two prisoners discuss the plight of a convict to be hanged the next day for murder.

Scene 4: In the prison

The text for this scene comes from Wilde's The Ballad of Reading Gaol. Whitman and Oscar act as observers and commentators, each on either side of the stage. The prisoners recite lines from the Ballad, whilst Death (in the form of the Dancer) leads them to their lowest point of despair. They then clear the space for preparations for the execution to begin. The condemned prisoner and the prison officials enter and take their places: the Dancer becomes the executioner, the 8 o'clock bell sounds, the lever is pulled, Death appears beside the gallows, and Wilde is alone on stage with the final words.

Scene 5: The prison's visiting room

Harris has arrived with good news for Wilde, whom Martin brings in. Harris' advocacy through his newspaper has resulted in the replacement of Isaacson and Wilde being allowed to have books and writing materials, as well as work in the prison garden rather than the punishment of the cranking. Wilde vows that he has learned one thing: pity. Suddenly Isaacson enters, and angrily expresses his desire to break Wilde completely. Wilde is taken back to his cell, and Martin then escorts Frank from the gaol.

Scene 6: The prison garden

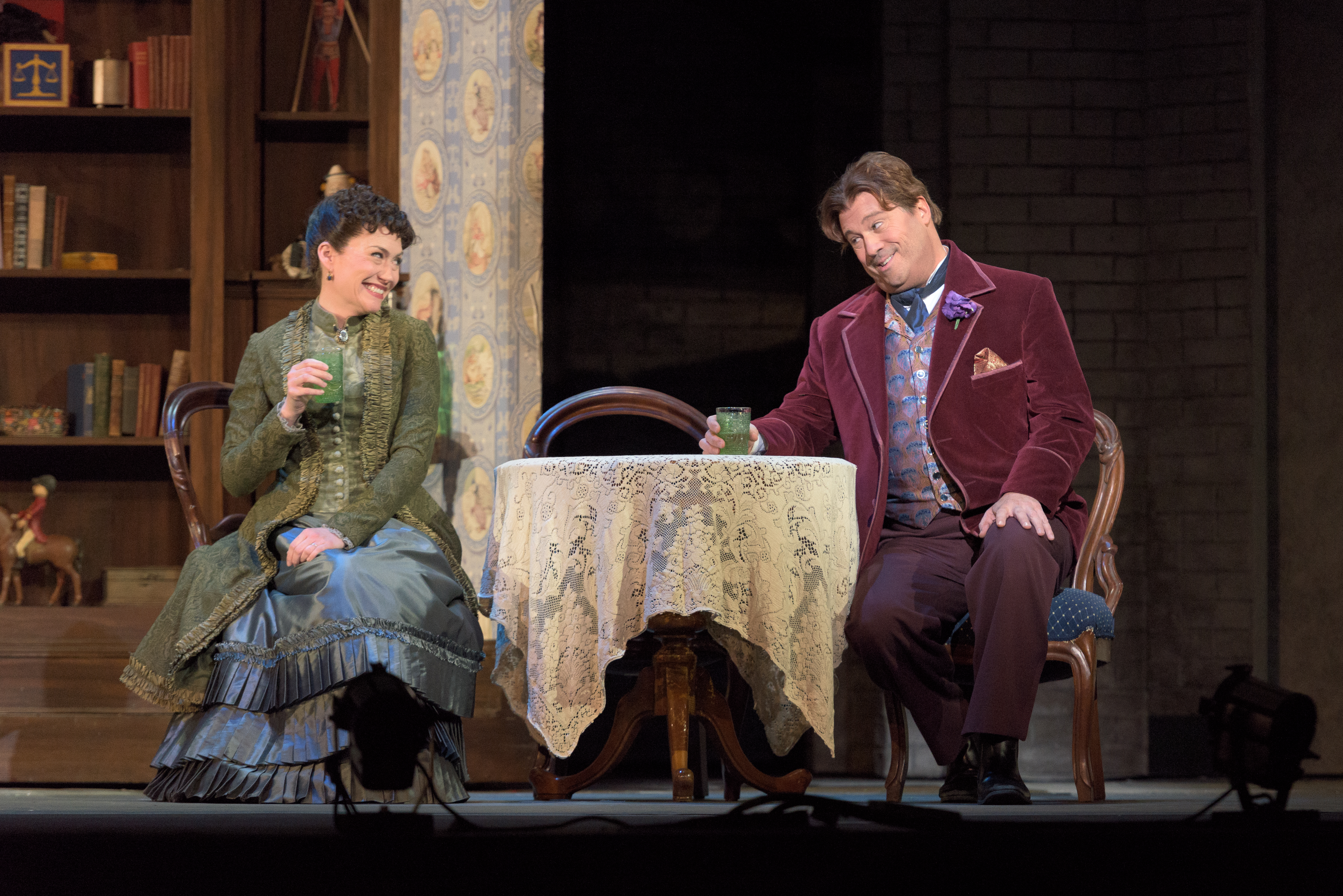
A scene from the 2015 Opera Philadelphia production, featuring Heidi Stober and David Daniels

Leverson is brought into the garden to see Wilde, who is taken aback and can only kiss her hand. She expresses joy that he will be free in three days, and he says that Harris has made arrangements. However, she tells him that the Jesuits have rejected him, and Leverson implies that she will take care of him. As Martin escorts Leverson out, Bosie appears upstage and dances towards Oscar, who reads from his 1881 poem, "Glukupikros Eros": "Sweet, I blame you not, for mine the fault was, had I not been made of common clay..." They embrace.

Epilogue: Immortality

A group of the Immortals calls out to Wilde as he and Bosie say farewell. Bosie leaves, and Whitman sings words from Leaves of Grass. Wilde then crosses the threshold of the House of Fame, where Whitman presents "Oscar Fingal O'Flahertie Wills Wilde" to the Immortals. Wilde addresses the Immortals and the audience with a line from his first play Vera; or, The Nihilists:

"For myself, the only immortality I desire is to invent a new sauce."

== Premiere and reception of original version ==
The director of the premiere production was Kevin Newbury. Other members of the production team included Seán Curran (choreographer), David Korins (scenic designer), David Woolard (costume designer), and Rick Fisher (lighting designer). Merlin Holland travelled to Santa Fe for the premiere.

Reviews of the opera's premiere generally praised the singers, the orchestra, conductor Evan Rogister, and the overall production values. Criticism focused on the weakness of the opera's dramaturgy, the hagiographic depiction of Oscar Wilde, and the derivative nature of the music:

"[Walt Whitman] introduces the tale at the outset, strolls in to comment on the situations as they unroll and ushers Wilde into the realm of immortality at the end. This device is useful to the extent that it efficiently fills in some backstory, but it also gives away where the drama is going. 'Oscar himself was prosecuted by the Crown for 'gross indecency' and found guilty,' states Whitman up front – after which the act moves back a step to the runup to that event, and then the action plays out exactly as we have been told it will. This is not a unique example of how the libretto manages to eviscerate what is already only marginally dramatic."

"The libretto....is a high-minded affair, preaching tolerance and abhorring bigotry at every turn. Mr. Cox, in program notes, makes a case for Wilde as a tragic figure. The opera goes further, all but deifying him.....One problem with agendas is that they don't always make for good drama. There is much to be explained and argued, and until the actual trial, late in the first act, there is much talk and exposition, whether spoken or sung (or danced), and little action."

"Morrison and Cox are so busy telling us of Wilde's greatness, if not actually deifying him, that they neglect to show us why he was held in such high esteem both before his fall and in modern times."

"The opera....captures him as he is convicted and brutally imprisoned for being gay in 1895. You feel great pity for Wilde. But you don't feel empathy. Wilde's character is rendered with dull perfection, deified, even, as a victim with no evident flaws of his own."

"Wilde is turned into something of a Christlike figure. His blindness, stubbornness and occasional cruelty are swept under the rug, but this is fiction, not a documentary.....Oscar might be turned into a great opera with judicious pruning. The vicious homophobia lurking beneath Victorian proprieties could be portrayed with fewer shouted slurs. Turning the trial into a farce of nursery figures, complete with jack-in-the-box judge, is a cheap gag."

"[Frank] Harris becomes a central character in the story (urging Wilde's flight to France), and a sympathetic one, but the opera ignores his brutal assessment of how success had corrupted Wilde into a dangerous arrogance and complacency: 'He had changed greatly and for the worse; he was growing coarser and harder every year. All his friends noticed this.' The result is a passive, amiable, mildly likable vision of one of the most tart, acerbic, brilliant, and intellectually preposterous men of his age; and even Wilde's likability is known not through what he says or does on stage, but by frequent assurances by secondary characters that he is a great and good man. He has no tragic flaw. In the end, he is simply a victim of intolerance. This is the source of the opera's excruciating sentimentality, the reduction of Wilde's tragedy to a fable of bigotry and victimization (with, of course, that happy Parnassian ending)."

".....the libretto...tries to paint Wilde as a martyr and a tragic figure, but its earnestness, combined with meandering music that recalls composers from Bach to Prokofiev without settling on a particular profile, makes him more of a pathetic one."

"Mr. Morrison's music, highly eclectic (Mahler, Stravinsky, Bartok, you name it), doesn't so much animate the plot as merely react to it. Melodies are too often of that aimless, blandly zigzag variety favored by composers who don't want to sound harshly atonal or tunefully accessible."

".....the score to Oscar is derivative to the point of anonymity; and while Morrison sets words in fluent, singable lines, his music lacks the sharp edge needed to draw us into Wilde's tragedy, a problem it shares with the libretto."

"Morrison has provided a reactionary and sentimental score. Notwithstanding momentary bites of bitonality, an infusion of harmonic sevenths and patterns that trace whole-tones, it resides mostly in a space between Benjamin Britten's Peter Grimes and Aaron Copland's The Tender Land."

"Morrison captures the rhythms and inflection of the words in the most natural, grateful vocal lines imaginable. Neo-romantic orchestral writing has a strong cinematic – and sometimes frankly illustrative – quality. Much is genuinely beautiful, but it mainly boils down to three gestures: gentle lappings of bittersweet harmonies, dissonant fanfares at dramatically charged moments and brief episodes of neoclassical wind chirpings."

"Morrison's score is more mature and of-the-moment, influenced as classical music is these days by everything from Verdi to movie soundtracks."

"Morrison's robust, derivative score is a model of effectiveness, if lacking much coherence. He admits to a fondness for Britten and it shows, with reminders of Samuel Barber and Menotti and, in Wilde's two big arias, a tiny homage to the final scene of Strauss' Capriccio. Even Tom Rakewell haunts Wilde's prisonhouse."

"....the musical palette is consistently gray. Humor, which was so essential to Wilde, not least as a way of disguising his subversive agenda, is a musical inconvenience for Morrison, who seems comfortable only when indulging an occasional paroxysm of melody in the grand manner of Hollywood. Almost everything in this sober, hagiographic spectacle is borrowed: from Britten, from Richard Strauss, from Maurice Jarre, from Shostakovich."

== Revised version ==
Several months after the premiere production in Santa Fe, Morrison and Cox revised the opera for its next scheduled group of performances at Opera Philadelphia. The Opera Philadelphia performances featured the same singers in the lead roles, the same director and production design team, and the same conductor as in Santa Fe. Critical reaction paralleled that of the original version, with praise for the singers, conductor, and orchestra, and criticism of the hagiographic characterisation of Wilde and of the work's dramaturgy:

'This new work about Oscar Wilde's "gross indecency" conviction was so one-dimensional in its first half Friday at the Academy of Music that the opera – which might as well be titled St. Oscar – forgot how to be theater. Those committed to attending should take heart: Act II has far more dramatic viability, though it may be too little too late.'

"Oscar contains several powerful and moving moments, particularly in its second half; both text and staging tend to go off the rails when the opera aspires to be (in Tony Kushner’s phrase) A Gay Fantasia — the trial-scene-amidst-giant-nursery-toys and the dead Walt Whitman's parlando narration are notable misfires."
