= Coffee with... Biographies =

Book series

The Coffee with... biography series is a selection of books published by Duncan Baird between 2007 and 2008 each containing fictional conversations with real famous people, conveying biographical fact. A review of Coffee with Oscar Wilde in The Independent, for example, explains that in it the author, Wilde's grandson Merlin Holland, "offers an imaginary and imaginative conversation between himself and his grandfather, set in a contemporary Parisian café". The review described that volume as "an ideal introduction to Wilde's seductive and intellectually electrifying world".

The first set of volumes published in 2007 covered eight figures: Ernest Hemingway, Gautama Buddha, Marilyn Monroe, Michelangelo, Mozart, Plato, Oscar Wilde, and Groucho Marx.

== Works in the series ==
Title	Published	Author	Foreword by
Coffee with Aristotle	2008	Jonathan Barnes	Julian Barnes
Coffee with Dickens	2008	Paul Schlicke	Peter Ackroyd
Coffee with Einstein	2008	Carlos I. Calle	Roger Penrose
Coffee with Groucho	2007	Simon Louvish	
Coffee with Hemingway	2007	Kirk Curnutt	John Updike
Coffee with Isaac Newton	2008	Michael White	Bill Bryson
Coffee with Marilyn	2007	Yona Zeldis McDonough	
Coffee with Mark Twain	2008	Fred Kaplan	
Coffee with Michelangelo	2007	James W. Hall	John Julius Norwich
Coffee with Mozart	2007	Julian Rushton	John Tavener
Coffee with Oscar Wilde	2007	Merlin Holland (Wilde's grandson)	Simon Callow
Coffee with Plato	2007	Donald R. Moor	Robert M. Pirsig
Coffee with Shakespeare	2008	Stanley Wells	Joseph Fiennes
Coffee with the Buddha	2007	Joan Duncan Oliver	Annie Lennox
