= Marc Samuelson =

British producer

Marc Samuelson is a British TV and film producer and executive producer.

== Early life ==
Peter Samuelson is his brother. G. B. Samuelson is his grandfather. Emma Samms is his cousin.

== Career ==
In 1987, Samuelson was a Director of the Association of Independent Producers, Director of the Edinburgh International Television Festival, and MD of Umbrella Films (producers of White Mischief and 1984).

From 1990 to 2006 he ran Samuelson Productions with his LA-based brother, Peter Samuelson, and produced films such as the Oscar-nominated Tom & Viv, the award-winning Wilde starring Stephen Fry and Jude Law, Arlington Road, Gabriel & Me, The Gathering, Things To Do Before You're 30, and Stormbreaker which became one of the most successful UK films of 2006, grossing over $13.5m in the UK alone. He executive produced The Libertine, Keeping Mum and Chromophobia.

In August 2007, Samuelson became a director of CinemaNX, the film investment company backed by the Isle of Man Government. NX films produced include The Disappearance of Alice Creed, the BAFTA nominated Me and Orson Welles, A Bunch of Amateurs, Heartless, Oscar nominated Chico & Rita, Wild Target, Albatross, TT3D: Closer to the Edge (the first ever documentary to appear in the list of top 20 independent films at the UK box office, grossing £1.26m in 2011), The Decoy Bride, Ashes and Honour. At NX Samuelson was also an Executive Producer of acclaimed BBC drama series The Shadow Line, written and directed by Hugo Blick.

Samuelson is an Executive Producer and director of Route24, an independent television production company founded with Robert Cheek and Josie Law. ITV Studios Global Entertainment own a minority stake in the company. Route24 has a number of original series and adaptations in development with broadcasters and has an overall deal with the John Wyndham Estate.

Samuelson is Executive Producer of the TV adaptation of Wyndham's novel, The Midwich Cuckoos, currently in production in London for Sky, written by David Farr (Hanna, The Night Manager). The series stars Keeley Hawes and Aisling Loftus.

He is also Executive Producer of Signora Volpe, a 3 x 90' series for Acorn TV. Banijay Rights are distributing. The series was created and written by Rachel Cuperman & Sally Griffiths, stars Emilia Fox and was shot in Rome and Umbria in 2021.

He is an ex-Board Member of the UK Film Council and Governor of the NFTS and is currently a Council Member of PACT and a member of BAFTA's Film Committee.

== Projects ==
Samuelson has produced or executive produced over thirty films and TV shows.

=== Producer and executive producer ===
- TT3D: Closer to the Edge (2011) (producer)
- Roofworld (2006) (announced) (producer)
- Tales Not Told (2006) (announced) (producer)
- Skellig (2007) (pre-production) (executive producer)
- Stormbreaker (2006) (producer)
- Keeping Mum (2005) (executive producer)
- Chromophobia (2005) (executive producer)
- Need (2005/II) (producer)
- The Libertine (2004) (executive producer)
- Strange Little Girls (2004) (executive producer)
- Things To Do Before You're 30 (2004) (producer)
- The Pact (2002) (TV) (executive producer)
- The Gathering (2002) (producer)
- Gabriel & Me (2001) (producer)
- Guest House Paradiso (1999) (executive producer)
- Arlington Road (1999) (producer)
- The Commissioner (1998) (co-producer)
- This Is the Sea (1997) (executive producer)
- Wilde (1997) (producer)
- Dog's Best Friend (1997) (TV) (executive producer)
- Tom & Viv (1994) (producer)
- Playmaker (1994) (producer)
- Man God and Africa (1992) (TV) (producer)

=== Production associate ===
- White Mischief (1987) (production associate)
