= The Gathering (2002 film) =

- Directed by: Brian Gilbert
- Written by: Anthony Horowitz
- Produced by: Marc Samuelson; Peter Samuelson
- Starring: Christina Ricci; Ioan Gruffudd; Kerry Fox; Stephen Dillane; Simon Russell Beale; Robert Hardy; Jessica Mann; Harry Forrester; Peter McNamara; Steven Mustoe
- Music by: Anne Dudley
- Distributed by: Dimension Films
- Release dates: 17 May 2002 (Cannes); January 2003 (Gerardmer)
- Running time: 97 minutes
- Language: English

The Gathering is a 2002 British thriller/horror film directed by Brian Gilbert and starring Christina Ricci.

== Plot ==
Cassie Grant (Christina Ricci) is a young girl from the United States who is wandering through England on foot. On her way to Ashby Wake, Cassie is hit by a car. The driver of the car, Mrs. Marion Kirkman (Kerry Fox), immediately calls an ambulance. During an examination at the local hospital the doctor concludes Cassie only has some scratches and not even a concussion, but Cassie has lost her memory due to the accident. She only knows her name and mother country, but she does not know which town she comes from, who her family is, or why she is in England. The doctor explains to her that the loss of memory is caused by a shock and that she will regain it after some recuperation. As a result of the examination, Cassie is checked out. Mrs. Kirkman invites Cassie to stay at her house until she has overcome her loss of memory, because Mrs. Kirkman feels guilty and responsible for the lonely girl who nobody knows.

While recovering, Cassie is drawn into a deeper mystery, which seems to involve her hosts and other people she sees about the town. Her lack of memory compounds the air of suspense as she encounters a man named Dan Blakely (Ioan Gruffudd), whom she believes she knows, but with no idea from where. Cassie becomes very attached to Mrs. Kirkman's son, Michael (Harry Forrester) and becomes acquainted with her husband Simon (Stephen Dillane), an art historian, who is in the process of examining a church from Early Christianity, built in Glastonbury during the first century AD, after the arrival of Joseph of Arimathea. This church was recently discovered by two visitors to the Glastonbury Festival, who died after falling down a hole through the open roof of the buried church. In the Church there is an unusual relief made of stone, which illustrates the crucifixion of Christ. Also depicted are many curious onlookers who appear to be observing the gruesome scene.

During the next few days, Cassie has visions of the future of the people around her. She also recognises certain people who seem to watch her and often appear in a certain place in town. She observes the strange auto mechanic, Frederick Michael Argyle (Peter McNamara) and examines his belongings, which include a scrapbook containing news clippings that detail accusations of child abuse at a local orphanage, that were ignored by the townspeople. The orphanage turns out to be the house the Kirkmans now live in. Cassie finds that Argyle was one of the children who was abused and that he identifies himself with the young Michael. She discovers that Argyle is planning to take revenge on the people of Ashby Wake for their cruelty to him. Cassie suspects that a catastrophe is imminent, but she is unable to persuade anyone else of the impending danger she senses.

She eventually finds out that the relief in the church illustrates a group of people known as "The Gathering." They are immortal and damned to watch catastrophes and murders for eternity as they stopped to watch the crucifixion of Christ out of morbid curiosity, a concept similar to the legend of the Wandering Jew. The priest and Bishop also discover this, and the priest rushes to inform Mr. Kirkman. On the way, he sees the "Gathering" on a bridge over the highway, and dies in a car accident as a result. The Gathering merely watch. Later that same day, Cassie experiences visions where she watches a young Argyle dragged into the house by the orphanage priest, while three of the town's leading figures watch and laugh. The priest then drags the child into a nearby room where he further abuses the child and is joined by the other three men. Cassie follows the men into the room, only to wake from the vision to see Michael standing over pictures of the archaeological site. Cassie then finds one of the photographs, which seems to horrify her.

After the priest's accident, the Bishop is able to pass on this strange news to Mr. Kirkman, who realises that his family is in great danger. He hastens to drive home to try to prevent whatever is fated to occur. Cassie is then seen attending the local fair with the Kirkman children only to then see the strange people gathering around the fairgrounds. She attempts to warn the police once more of Argyle's intent, but instead discovers Dan, who has killed the officer on duty. He then reveals that he is one of the Gathering, who have since stopped simply watching the world's tragedies but have also begun to set up the potential tragedies to be more likely to happen. Cassie manages to prevent Argyle from killing festival goers with a bomb, but is unable to stop him taking revenge upon the men who had abused him. After a harrowing chase, Cassie sacrifices her life to save the lives of the children of the Kirkman family. Mr. Kirkman arrives just in time to stop Argyle from killing his family. At the end it is revealed that Cassie also belongs to The Gathering, because just after she "dies", she appears standing among them as they stare at Argyle dying. Cassie is shown to be weeping while the others just stand there and watch impassively. Because Cassie has shown compassion and tried to prevent evil deeds, her life of wandering will end and she will find peace, which she tells the son of Mr. Kirkman at night on the same day.

== Cast ==
- Christina Ricci as Cassie Grant
- Ioan Gruffudd as Dan Blakeley
- Kerry Fox as Marion Kirkman
- Stephen Dillane as Simon Kirkman
- Simon Russell Beale as Luke Fraser
- Robert Hardy as the Bishop
- Harry Forrester as Michael Kirkman
- Jessica Mann as Emma Kirkman
- Peter McNamara as Frederick Michael Argyle

== Filming locations ==
The production team visited Penshurst Place in Kent to film at the Barons Hall, which doubled up as part of the Cathedral where the Bishop held meetings with the Clergy. The external filming of the Cathedral was Wells Cathedral in Somerset, England, and the nearby Vicars' Close. Scenes set within the village of Ashby Wake were filmed in Northleach, Gloucestershire, including the market square. Hatherop in Gloucestershire, and its Primary School (the school Michael attends) appear. Exterior and interior shots of the house were filmed at Wytham Abbey, Oxfordshire.

== Critical reaction ==
Well, spend a few quality minutes with The Gathering and you'll see, in short order, just how bad one of these canned atrocities can be.

— Christopher Null, filmcritic.com

It's a dreadfully empty-headed snooze of a thriller.

— David Cornelius, efilmcritic.com

Similarities with the Ray Bradbury story "The Crowd" have been noted.

== Versions ==
There are two different versions of the film. In the USA, the United Kingdom and in Germany only an abridged version was published on DVD, which is 13 minutes shorter than the original. A sex scene and many dialogues were left out. This abridged version lasts exactly 83:31 (PAL-DVD). The unabridged TV version, shown on ZDF in Germany and on BBC in the UK, and released on DVD in France, Poland and Japan, lasts approx. 97 minutes (PAL) and 101 minutes (NTSC).

== Awards ==
- Nomination for the Fantasporto Award 2003
- Nomination for the Golden Fleece of the Golden Trailer Awards 2003
