= Daniel Osbourne =

Daniel Osbourne may refer to:

- Daniel Osbourne (Coronation Street)
- Oz (Buffy the Vampire Slayer) (real name Daniel Osbourne), fictional character in Buffy the Vampire Slayer

== See also ==
- Daniel Osborne (disambiguation)
