= Arlington Road =

1999 film by Mark Pellington

- Theatrical release poster
- Directed by: Mark Pellington
- Written by: Ehren Kruger
- Produced by: Peter Samuelson; Tom Gorai; Marc Samuelson
- Starring: Jeff Bridges; Tim Robbins; Joan Cusack; Hope Davis; Robert Gossett
- Cinematography: Bobby Bukowski
- Edited by: Conrad Buff
- Music by: Angelo Badalamenti
- Production companies: Screen Gems; Lakeshore Entertainment; Tom Gorai Productions; Marc Samuelson Productions; Arlington Road Productions Corp.
- Distributed by: Sony Pictures Releasing (United States); PolyGram Filmed Entertainment (United Kingdom)
- Release dates: March 19, 1999 (United Kingdom); July 9, 1999 (United States)
- Running time: 119 minutes
- Countries: United Kingdom; United States
- Language: English
- Budget: $31 million
- Box office: $41.1 million

Arlington Road is a 1999 neo-noir mystery thriller film directed by Mark Pellington and starring Jeff Bridges, Tim Robbins, Joan Cusack, and Hope Davis. The film tells the story of a widowed George Washington University professor who suspects his new neighbors are involved in terrorism and becomes obsessed with foiling their terrorist plot. The film was heavily inspired by the growing concern in the 1990s regarding the right-wing militia movement, Ruby Ridge, the Waco siege and Oklahoma City bombing.

Ehren Kruger wrote the script, which won the Academy of Motion Picture Arts and Sciences' (AMPAS) Nicholl Fellowship in 1996. The film originally was to have been released by PolyGram Filmed Entertainment, but the film's United States distribution rights were sold to Sony Pictures Entertainment for $6 million. The eventual release was the second title for Screen Gems (and its first wide theatrical release) while PolyGram (now part of Universal Studios) handled some foreign rights.

== Plot ==
Michael Faraday is a history professor at George Washington University, teaching a class on American terrorism and living in Reston, Virginia, with his young son Grant. Since the death of his wife Leah, an FBI agent, Michael remains friends with her partner Whit Carver and is dating his former graduate student Brooke Wolfe. Finding a boy named Brady injured by fireworks, Michael rushes him to the hospital and meets his parents, Oliver and Cheryl Lang. They discover they are neighbours on Arlington Road and their sons become friends, joining a scouting troop together.

Oliver appears to lie about an alumni letter delivered by mistake and about a blueprint Michael notices in the Langs' house. Michael becomes suspicious, intensified by Oliver's anti-government sentiments and his interest in Leah's death, but reluctantly lets Grant join Brady on a scouting trip. He presents his class with the case of Dean Scobee, who died bombing a federal building in St. Louis months earlier despite no record of terrorist activity. Bringing his students to the site of the Ruby Ridge-style standoff where Leah was killed, an emotional Michael excoriates the FBI for mistakenly identifying their target as a potential terrorist.

Michael determines Oliver lied about where he attended college and was actually born William Fenimore in the same Kansas town as the deceased Oliver Lang, and 16-year-old William was arrested for trying to blow up a government office. Michael convinces the Langs' children to let him into Oliver's home office while their parents are out, and he finds the suspicious blueprint hidden behind a Gateway Arch schematic, but is nearly caught when Cheryl returns. Brooke dismisses Michael's concerns, suggesting his terrorism studies and Leah's death have made him paranoid and obsessive.

Oliver confronts Michael for investigating him, explaining that the attempted bombing was a regrettable act as an angry teenager: the government cut off his family's farm from their water supply, and his father committed suicide, staged as an accident so the family could collect his life insurance payout, but they lost their land. To escape his past, William assumed the name of Oliver Lang, a childhood friend who died after college. Brooke later spots Oliver switching vehicles and follows him to a warehouse where he loads his car with mysterious cases. She leaves Michael a voicemail but is confronted by Cheryl.

That night, Michael learns Brooke has been killed in an apparent car accident, and is comforted by the Langs, apologising to them for his mistrust. However, a call from Whit reveals that Michael's answering machine has been erased, and he warns Whit to investigate his suspicions about Oliver. Visiting Dean Scobee's father, who is certain his son could not have acted alone, Michael notices a photo of Dean with Grant's scout leader. He realizes Grant has been taken by Oliver, who declares that he and his sinister group killed Brooke; he murdered the real Oliver to assume his identity, and threatens Grant's life, warning Michael not to interfere with their plans.

Whit finds nothing incriminating about Oliver but confirms that Michael received a call from the payphone Brooke used. Driving there, Michael spots the Langs' associates and tries to follow them but sees Grant inside their van. Michael is intercepted and beaten by Oliver, who asserts his group's mission, but Michael overpowers him and realises he intends to blow up the J. Edgar Hoover Building. Warning Whit, Michael pursues the van into the building's garage, only to discover he is chasing a decoy. He finds the bomb planted in the trunk of his car as it detonates (having unknowingly driven the bomb to its destination in his own vehicle), and Oliver watches from a distance as the blast destroys FBI headquarters.

With Michael and Whit among the dead, the Langs and their conspirators successfully frame Michael as a lone wolf terrorist — just as they did with Dean Scobee — seeking revenge on the FBI for Leah's death, supported by accounts of his increasingly erratic behaviour. It is implied that the Langs and their organization had chosen Faraday long before to be their patsy because of his history, and had been planning to involve and frame him all along. The orphaned Grant moves in with relatives, unaware of his father's innocence, while Oliver and Cheryl prepare to move their family to another safe suburb for their next attack.

== Cast ==
- Jeff Bridges as Michael Faraday
- Tim Robbins as Oliver Lang/William Fenimore
- Joan Cusack as Cheryl Lang/Fenimore
- Hope Davis as Brooke Wolfe
- Robert Gossett as FBI Agent Whit Carver
- Mason Gamble as Brady Lang/Fenimore
- Spencer Treat Clark as Grant Faraday
- Stanley Anderson as Dr. Archer Scobee
- Laura Poe as FBI Agent Leah Faraday

== Production ==
In May 1997, it was reported that Samuelson Productions would produce the Ehren Kruger scripted thriller Arlington Road to be directed by Mark Pellington. Kruger stated he was inspired by the thriller scripts of the 1970s "when plots were never completely resolved and heroes and villains were less easily distinguishable" with his script earning him the 1996 Nicholl Fellowship for screenwriting.

== Reception ==
=== Box office ===
Sony paid $6 million to acquire the film's United States distribution rights. It opened at #6 in its opening weekend with $7,515,145 behind American Pie, Wild Wild West's second, Big Daddy's third, and Tarzan and The General's Daughter's fourth weekends. The film eventually grossed $24,756,177 in the United States theatrically.

The film made a worldwide gross of $41 million on a budget of $31 million.

=== Critical response ===
The film holds a 63% rating on Rotten Tomatoes based on 92 reviews. with the site's consensus stating; "A suspenseful thriller led by strong cast performances built around a somewhat implausible story." Metacritic, which uses a weighted average, assigned the film a score of 65 out of 100, based on 26 critics, indicating "generally favorable" reviews. Audiences polled by CinemaScore gave the film an average grade of "B−" on an A+ to F scale.

Roger Ebert, who gave the film 2 out of 4 stars, wrote of the film:

Arlington Road is a thriller that contains ideas. Any movie with ideas is likely to attract audiences who have ideas of their own, but to think for a second about the logic of this plot is fatal.

Janet Maslin of The New York Times called the film "well paced and cleverly constructed" and praised it as "a major boon for anyone realizing that there's life beyond the lead-footed summer blockbuster." Empire gave the film 3/5 stars and said the casting was inspired.

== Home media ==
The film was initially released on VHS and DVD October 26, 1999 by Columbia TriStar Home Video. A Blu-ray of the film was later released on August 7, 2007 by Sony Pictures Home Entertainment.

== Television adaptation ==
In April 2021, it was announced a television series adaptation based on the film was in development at Paramount+. The project is to be a co-production between CBS Studios and Village Roadshow Television with Pellington and Seth Fisher serving as executive producers.
