= John Cox (director) =

English opera director

John Cox (born 12 March 1935) is an English opera director. Born in Bristol, he was educated at St Edmund Hall, Oxford, and trained at Glyndebourne as assistant to Carl Ebert, and then at the York Theatre Royal and BBC television, made his directing debut with Ravel's L'enfant et les sortilèges for the Sadler's Wells company in 1965.

In 1971 he was appointed as the first director of production at Glyndebourne, to oversee existing productions and create new ones. During his tenure he worked with designers including David Hockney, Sir Hugh Casson, Michael Annals and William Dudley. The critic Rodney Milnes singles out for mention Cox's Glyndbourne productions of Richard Strauss operas: Ariadne auf Naxos (1971), Capriccio (1973), Intermezzo (1974), Die schweigsame Frau (1977), Der Rosenkavalier (1980) and Arabella (1984). His most successful production there, however, was of Stravinsky's "The Rake's Progress" (1975) which had designs by Hockney (his first venture into opera). The production was staged eight times by the Festival, the most recent in 2023 - making it among the longest lasting production of an opera. It was also seen widely in Europe and the USA.

Cox succeeded Peter Ebert as general administrator and artistic director of Scottish Opera in 1981, holding the post until 1986. In 1988 he was appointed production director of the Royal Opera, Covent Garden.

As well as Strauss, Cox is particularly known for his Mozart and Rossini productions. In 2000 he collaborated with John Stoddart to stage Capriccio at the Sydney Opera House during the 2000 Summer Olympics. He has also worked widely in Europe and the USA. Milnes mentions in particular Daphne in Munich, Don Carlos in San Francisco, Un ballo in maschera in Sydney and Patience, one of the English National Opera's longest-running successes. For the Metropolitan Opera, New York, Cox directed Capriccio in 2011.

He is the librettist and collaborator with the American composer Theodore Morrison of a new opera about Oscar Wilde, Oscar, which was given its world premiere at The Santa Fe Opera during the Summer 2013 season.
