= Vyvyan Holland =

British author and translator (1886–1967)

Vyvyan Holland OBE
- Born: Vyvyan Oscar Beresford Wilde; 3 November 1886; London, England
- Died: 10 October 1967 (aged 80); London, England
- Occupations: Author, translator
- Spouses: Violet Mary Craigie (m. 1914; died 1918) Dorothy Thelma Helen Besant (m. 1943)
- Children: Merlin Holland
- Parent(s): Oscar Wilde; Constance Wilde

Vyvyan Beresford Holland, OBE (born Vyvyan Oscar Beresford Wilde; 3 November 1886 – 10 October 1967) was an English author and translator. He was the second-born son of Irish playwright Oscar Wilde and Constance Wilde, and had a brother, Cyril.

== Biography ==
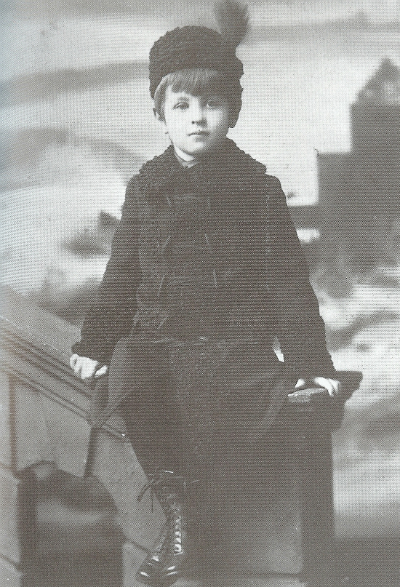
Vyvyan Wilde in 1891 aged five

John Ruskin was Oscar Wilde's first choice as godfather to Vyvyan, but he refused because of his age. Wilde then asked Mortimer Menpes, who accepted. According to Vyvyan Holland's accounts in his autobiography, Son of Oscar Wilde (1954), Oscar was a devoted and loving father to his two sons and their childhood was a relatively happy one.

After 1895, when Wilde was convicted of the charge of "gross indecency" and imprisoned, Constance changed her and the boys’ surname to Holland, and forced Wilde to give up his parental rights.

She relocated with the boys to Switzerland and enrolled them in an English-speaking boarding school in Germany. Vyvyan was unhappy there. Because of this, and to reduce the risk of the boys being identified as Wilde’s sons, Vyvyan was relocated to a Jesuit school in Monaco. He converted to Catholicism and subsequently attended Stonyhurst College in England, a public school also managed by Jesuits. His brother Cyril remained at the school in Germany.

After Constance died in 1898, her relatives sought legal counsel to prevent Oscar Wilde from seeing his sons again. Wilde died in 1900.

Vyvyan studied law at Trinity Hall, Cambridge, from 1905, but tired of his studies and left Cambridge in 1907. On 20 July 1909 he accompanied his father's friend Robert Ross to witness the transferral of his father's remains from Bagneux Cemetery to Père Lachaise Cemetery in Paris.

Holland resumed his study of law at the age of 22, and was admitted to the Bar of England and Wales by the Inner Temple in 1912. He also began to write poems and short stories.

Holland married Violet Mary Craigie on 7 January 1914. She died on 15 October 1918 at Westminster Hospital, Middlesex, subsequent to injuries caused by her evening gown catching alight near an open fire.

At the start of the First World War in 1914, Holland was commissioned a second lieutenant in the Interpreters Corps. He later transferred into 114 Battery, XXV Bde Royal Field Artillery. He was demobilised on 27 July 1919 and was awarded an OBE. His brother Cyril had been killed by a German sniper on 9 May 1915, during the Battle of Festubert in France.

Holland became an author and translator. At the beginning of the Second World War, he was offered a position as a translator and editor for the BBC, a post he held for six years. In September 1943, he married his second wife, Dorothy Thelma Helen Besant, a great-grandniece of the campaigner Annie Besant. Born in Australia, she had relocated to London. Their only child, Merlin Holland, was born in London in 1945.

In 1947 Holland and his wife left for Australia and New Zealand, where she had been invited to give lectures on fashionable dress in 19th-century Australia. The couple lived in Melbourne from 1948 to 1952.

In 1954, after returning to England, Holland published an autobiography entitled Son of Oscar Wilde.

Vyvyan Holland died in London in 1967, aged 80.

== Books ==
- The Mediaeval Courts of Love (1927) privately printed book
- On the Subject of Bores (1935) privately printed book
- Son of Oscar Wilde (1954), memoir, E P Dutton & Co, 1954.
- Oscar Wilde and his world (1960)
- Oscar Wilde – a pictorial biography (1960)
- Time Remembered After Pere Lachaise (1966) a continuation of his memoirs
