= Danny Osborne =

English sculptor

- Born: 1949 (age 76–77); Dorset, England
- Education: Bournemouth & Poole College of Art
- Notable work: Oscar Wilde Memorial
- Website: dannyosborne.com

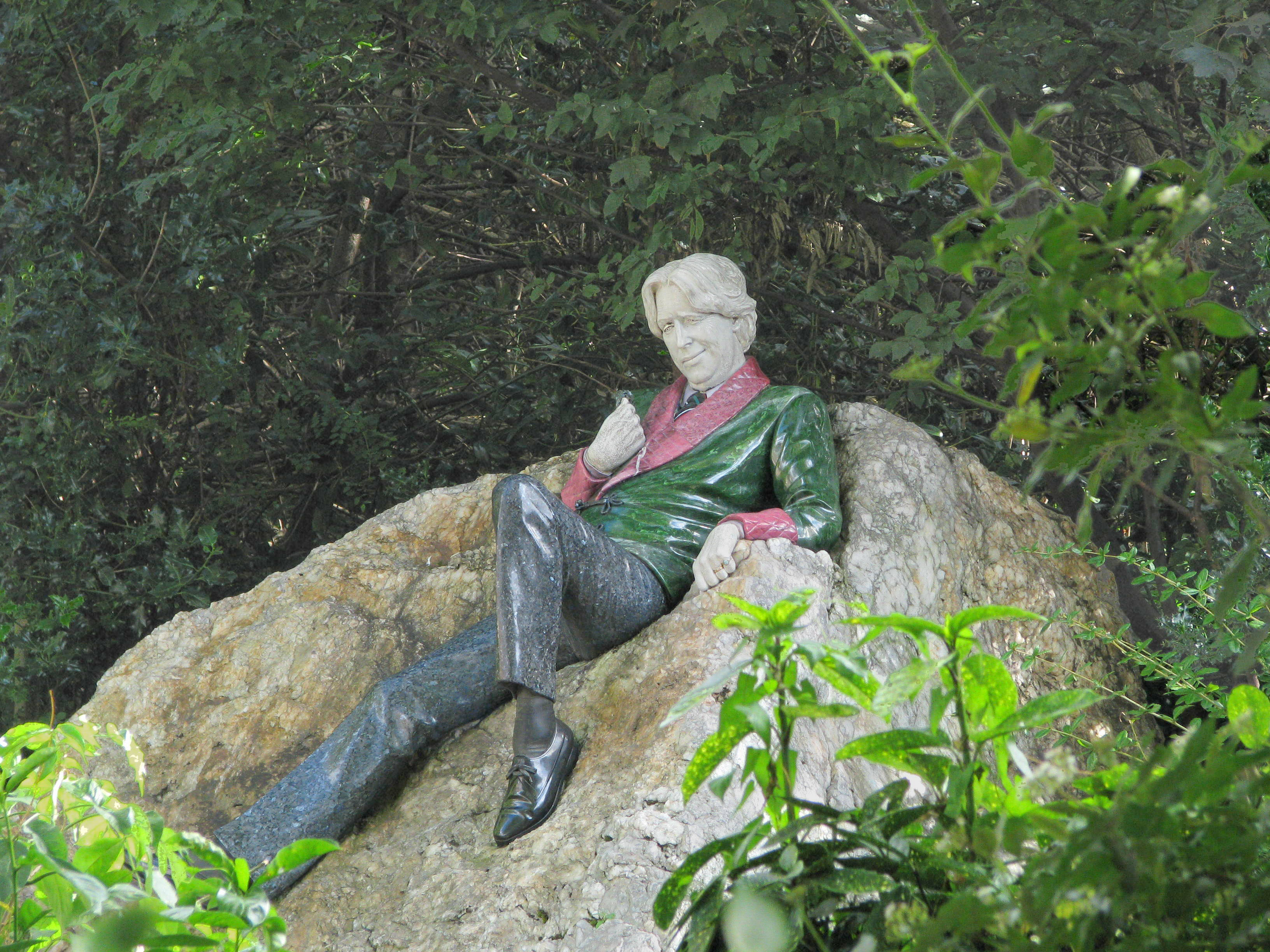
Statue of writer Oscar Wilde by Danny Osborne in Merrion Square, Dublin, Ireland. Unveiled 28 October 1997

Danny Osborne is an artist born in Dorset, England in 1949. He is a resident of Iqaluit, Nunavut, Canada and Cork, Ireland. Osborne studied at Bournemouth & Poole College of Art. He is best known for his public sculptures, particularly his Oscar Wilde Memorial Sculpture in Merrion Square Park (originally commissioned by Guinness Ireland Group for £45,000), located across from Ireland's National Gallery; listed by The Irish Times as one of the sites to see before you die along with an essay by Paula Murphy in the book Wilde: The Irishman and other notable public work including "First Breath" at Millennium Park in Kilrush, County Clare. In 1986, while living on the Beara peninsula in West Cork, Osborne and his series of porcelain figures were the subject of the documentary "Birds in Porcelain" by David Shaw-Smith.

He is also known for his paintings of the Canadian Arctic and his experimentation with lava flows to create sculptures, which he is believed to be the first to figure out a process of casting sculpture out of live lava flows. His work has included lava cast sculptures from the active complex volcano Pacaya. His work is in both public and private collections including AIB, the Arts Council of Ireland, Bord Fáilte, the Investment Bank of Ireland, Bank of Ireland, the Contemporary Irish Art Society, and Art Bank's inclusion of the sculpture 'Conquistador Helmet 1'.

On 1 April 2009, former Speaker of the Legislative Assembly of Nunavut Peter Kilabuk unveiled his official portrait painted by Osborne. He is a member of the Iqaluit Visual Artists and has also taught jewellery students at Nunavut Arctic College.

== See also ==
- Statues in Dublin
