= Cyril Holland =

Son of Oscar Wilde (1885–1915)

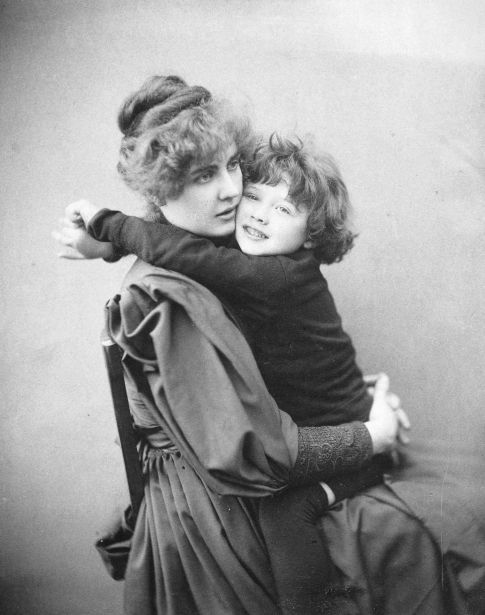
- Cyril Wilde with his mother Constance in 1889
- Born: Cyril Wilde; 5 June 1885
- Died: 9 May 1915 (aged 29); Festubert, France
- Cause of death: Killed in action
- Parents: Oscar Wilde (father); Constance Wilde (mother)

Cyril Holland (né Wilde; 5 June 1885 – 9 May 1915) was the elder of the two sons of Oscar Wilde and Constance Lloyd and brother to Vyvyan Holland.

== Life ==
According to his brother Vyvyan Holland's accounts in his autobiography, Son of Oscar Wilde (1954), Oscar was a devoted and loving father to his two sons. Their childhood was a relatively happy one. However, after Wilde's well-publicized trials in Britain, conviction in 1895, and imprisonment for gross indecency, their mother Constance took their children to Europe.

She began using the surname Holland for both the boys and herself in order to protect them from public scrutiny. She relocated with the boys to Switzerland and enrolled them at Neuenheim College, an English-speaking boarding school in Heidelberg, Germany. Oscar Wilde died in 1900; neither of his sons saw him again after he went to prison. When he was released, he went to France and never lived in the UK again.

From 1899 to 1903 Cyril attended Radley College, a private school then in Berkshire. After ending school, he became a gentleman cadet at the Royal Military Academy, Woolwich.

Holland was commissioned as a 2nd lieutenant, Royal Field Artillery, on 20 December 1905. He was promoted to lieutenant on 20 December 1908 and served in the United Kingdom for nearly three years. He was posted to India, where he served from September 1911 until 1914 with No. 9 Ammunition Column, RFA at Secunderabad. He was promoted to captain on 30 October 1914.

== Death ==
When the First World War began, Captain Holland was posted to British forces on the Continent. He participated in the battle for Neuve-Chapelle, where he was killed in France by a German sniper on 9 May 1915, during the Battle of Festubert. His grave is maintained by the War Graves Commission in St Vaast Post Military Cemetery, Richebourg-l'Avoué, France.
