= Luigi Maria Bossi =

Italian politician and gynecologist (1859–1919)

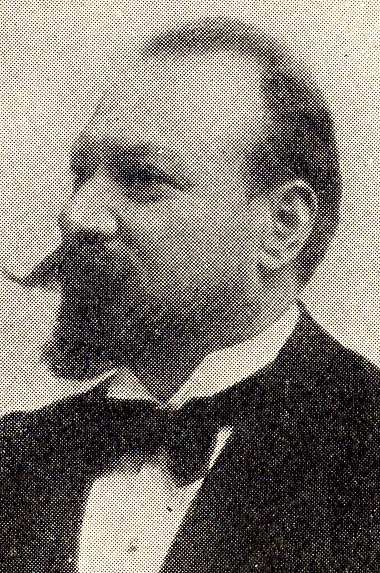
Luigi Maria Bossi c.1900

Luigi Maria Bossi (Malnate, 30 December 1859 – Milan, 1 February 1919) was a gynecologist and Italian politician.

He was director of the Institute of Obstetrics in Novara and of a Genoese clinic. In 1898, in Genoa, he operated on Constance Lloyd, the wife of Oscar Wilde, who died a few days after the operation. He was elected to Parliament for the Italian Socialist Party in the twenty-first Legislature of the Kingdom of Italy (1900–1904). He was assassinated by the husband of a patient for "a grossly unethical personal relationship with a patient".
