= Oscar Wilde bibliography =

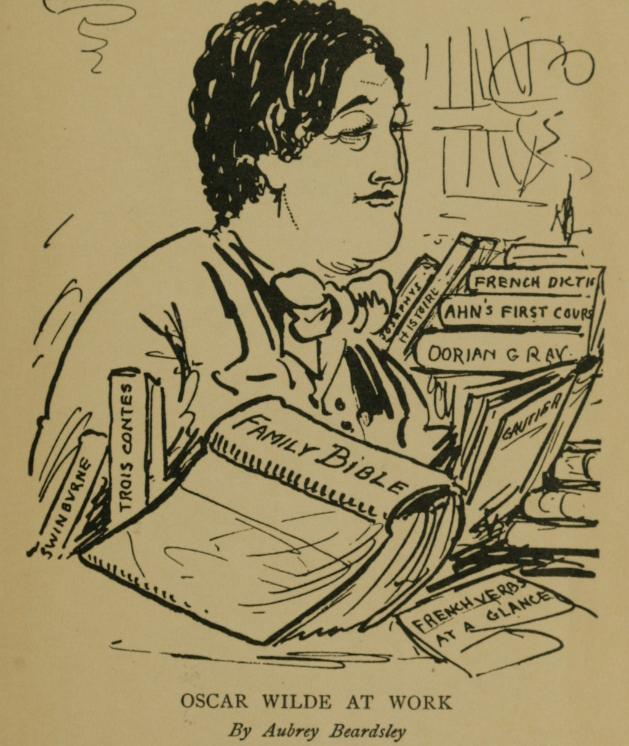
- A caricature of Wilde by Aubrey Beardsley. The caption reads "Oscar Wilde At Work".
- Novels↙: 1
- Plays↙: 9
- Misattributed↙: 2
- Posthumously↙: 6
- Essays↙: 7
- Short fiction↙: 14

This is a bibliography of works by Oscar Wilde (1854–1900), a late-Victorian Irish writer. Chiefly remembered today as a playwright, especially for The Importance of Being Earnest, and as the author of The Picture of Dorian Gray; Wilde's oeuvre includes criticism, poetry, children's fiction, and a large selection of reviews, lectures and journalism. His private correspondence has also been published.

Wilde was declared bankrupt to pay legal costs after his conviction for "gross indecency," and his possessions – including manuscripts, letters, books and presentation volumes of all the major literary figures of his day – were sold by auction. This has made bibliographical (and biographical) studies of unpublished work more difficult since they are widely dispersed, some in private ownership. The largest collection of Wilde's letters, manuscripts, and other material relating to his literary circle are housed at the William Andrews Clark Memorial Library. A number of Wilde's letters and manuscripts can also be found at the British Library, as well as public and private collections throughout Britain, the United States and France.

== Essays ==
- "The Philosophy of Dress" First published in The New-York Tribune (1885), published for the first time in book form in Oscar Wilde On Dress (2013).
- "The Decay of Lying" First published in Nineteenth Century (1889), republished in Intentions (1891).
- "Pen, Pencil and Poison" First published in the Fortnightly Review (1889), republished in Intentions (1891).
- "The Soul of Man under Socialism" First published in the Fortnightly Review (1891), republished in The Soul of Man (1895), privately printed. ("The Soul of Man Under Socialism" on Wikisource)
- Intentions (1891) Wilde revised his dialogues on aesthetic subjects for publication in this volume, which comprises:
  - "The Critic as Artist"
  - "The Decay of Lying"
  - "The Truth of Masks"
- "Phrases and Philosophies for the Use of the Young" first published in the Oxford student magazine The Chameleon, December 1894) ("Phrases and Philosophies for the Use of the Young" on Wikisource)
- "A Few Maxims For The Instruction Of The Over-Educated" First published, anonymously, in the 1894 November 17 issue of Saturday Review.

== Novel ==
- The Picture of Dorian Gray (1890/1891) was Wilde's only complete novel. The first version of "The Picture of Dorian Gray" was published, in a form highly edited by the magazine, as the lead story in the July 1890 edition of Lippincott's Monthly Magazine. Wilde published the longer and revised version in book form in 1891, with an added preface. The Uncensored Picture of Dorian Gray was published by the Belknap Press of Harvard University Press in 2012.

== Short fiction ==
- The Happy Prince and Other Tales (text) (1888, a collection of fairy tales) consisting of:
  - "The Happy Prince"
  - "The Selfish Giant"
  - "The Nightingale and the Rose"
  - "The Devoted Friend"
  - "The Remarkable Rocket"
- A House of Pomegranates (text) (1891, fairy tales) consisting of:
  - "The Young King"
  - "The Birthday of the Infanta"
  - "The Fisherman and His Soul"
  - "The Star-Child"
- Lord Arthur Savile's Crime and Other Stories (text) (1891) consisting of:
  - "Lord Arthur Savile's Crime"
  - "The Canterville Ghost"
  - "The Sphinx Without a Secret"
  - "The Model Millionaire"
  - "The Portrait of Mr. W. H."

== Poetry ==
(Incomplete list)

- Ravenna (1878) Winner of the Newdigate Prize.
- Requiescat (1880s) Regarding the childhood death of Wilde's sister, Isola Wilde.
- Poems (1881) Wilde's first collection of poetry and publication.
  - "Theocritus"
  - "Helas"
  - "To Milton"
  - "The Grave of Keats"
  - "Magdalen Walks"
  - "The New Helen"
  - "The Grave of Shelley"
  - "Eleutheria"
  - "The Garden of Eros"
  - "Rosa Mystica"
  - "The Burden Of Itys"
  - "Wind Flowers"
  - "Charmides"
  - "Flowers of Gold"
  - "Impressions de Théàtre"
  - "Panthea"
  - "The Fourth Movement"
  - "Humanitad"
- The Harlot's House (1885)
- The Sphinx (1894)
- Poems in Prose (1894)
  - "The Artist"
  - "The Doer of Good"
  - "The Disciple"
  - "The Master"
  - "The House of Judgement"
  - "The Teacher of Wisdom"
- The Ballad of Reading Gaol (1898)

== Plays ==
- Vera; or, The Nihilists (1880/1882) (text)
- The Duchess of Padua (1883) (text)
- Lady Windermere's Fan (1892) (text)
- A Woman of No Importance (1893) (text)
- An Ideal Husband (1895) (text)
- The Importance of Being Earnest (1895) (text)
- Salomé (1896) Translated from French by Lord Alfred Douglas (text)
- La Sainte Courtisane (Incomplete) (text)
- A Florentine Tragedy (Incomplete) (text)

(Dates are dates of first performance, which approximate better to the probable date of composition than dates of publication.)

== First published posthumously ==
- De Profundis (written 1895–97, in Reading Gaol). Expurgated edition published 1905; suppressed portions 1913, expanded version in The Letters of Oscar Wilde (1962).
- The Rise of Historical Criticism (written while at college). First published in 1905 (Sherwood Press, Hartford, CT), privately printed. Reprinted in Miscellanies, the last volume of the First Collected Edition (1908).
- The First Collected Edition (Methuen & Co., 14 volumes) appeared in 1908 and contained many previously unpublished works.
- The Second Collected Edition (Methuen & Co., 12 volumes) appeared in installments between 1909–11 and contained several other unpublished works.
- The Letters of Oscar Wilde (written 1868–1900). Published in 1962. Republished as The Complete Letters of Oscar Wilde (2000), with letters discovered since 1962 and new annotations by Merlin Holland.
- The Women of Homer (written 1876, while at college). First published in Oscar Wilde: The Women of Homer (2008) by the Oscar Wilde Society.

== Misattributed ==
- Teleny, or The Reverse of the Medal (Paris, 1893) has been attributed to Wilde, but its authorship is unclear. One theory is that it was a combined effort by several of Wilde's friends, which he may have edited.
- Constance – On September 14, 2011, Wilde's grandson Merlin Holland contested Wilde's claimed authorship of this play entitled Constance, scheduled to open that week in the King's Head Theatre. It was not, in fact, "Oscar Wilde's final play," as its producers were claiming. Holland said Wilde did sketch out the play's scenario in 1894, but "never wrote a word" of it, and that "it is dishonest to foist this on the public." The artistic director Adam Spreadbury-Maher of the King's Head Theatre and producer of Constance pointed out that Wilde's son, Vyvyan Holland, wrote, in 1954, "a significant amount of the dialogue (of Constance) bears the authentic stamp of my father's hand". There is further proof that the developed scenario that Constance was reconstituted from was written by Wilde between 1897 and his death in 1900, rather than the 1894 George Alexander scenario which Merlin Holland quotes.
