= Japan Astronomical Heritage =

Japan Astronomical Heritage (日本天文遺産, Nihon tenmon isan) is an initiative aimed at the recognition and valorization of the astronomical heritage of Japan. Analogous to the International Astronomical Union's list of Outstanding Astronomical Heritage, the first assets were designated by the Astronomical Society of Japan in March 2019 (FY2018); as of March 2026 (FY2025), twenty entries are on the list. Three categories are recognized: sites (historic sites and buildings, such as observatories), materials (historically significant items, such as astronomical instruments), and documents (including historic astronomy-related literature).

== Table ==
Asset	Prefecture	Municipality	Responsible party	Comments	Image	Coordinates	Category	FY	Ref.
Constellation Stone and Mutsu Kesen District Tōni Village Survey Stele 星座石と陸奥州気仙郡唐丹村測量之碑 seiza-seki to Mutsu-shū Kesen-gun Tōni-mura sokuryō no hi	Iwate	Kamaishi	Kamaishi Board of Education	Prefectural Tangible Cultural Property		39°12′33″N 141°53′07″E	Materials	2025	
Agematsu Infrared Telescope 上松赤外線望遠鏡; Agematsu sekigaisen bōenkyō	Hyōgo	Sayō	University of Hyogo Nishi-Harima Observatory			35°01′33″N 134°20′10″E	Materials	2025	
Temporary Latitude Observatory Main Building (Kimura Hisashi Memorial Museum) 臨時緯度観測所本館(木村榮記念館) rinji ido kansokujo honkan (Kimura Hisashi Kinenkan)	Iwate	Ōshū	Mizusawa VLBI Observatory	Registered Tangible Cultural Property		39°08′02″N 141°07′58″E	Sites	2024	
Mitaka 200 MHz Radio Telescope 三鷹200MHz 太陽電波望遠鏡; Mitaka ni-hyaku mega-herutsu taiyō denpa bōenkyō	Nagano	Minamimaki	Nobeyama Radio Observatory			35°56′27″N 138°28′13″E	Materials	2024	
Kwasan Observatory (Main Building, Annex, Meridian Building) 花山天文台(本館、別館、子午線館); Kazan tenmondai (honkan, bekkan, shigosen-kan)	Kyōto	Kyōto	Kyoto University			34°59′38″N 135°47′36″E	Sites	2024	
Repsold Meridian Telescope and Room レプソルド子午儀及びレプソルド子午儀室; Repusorudo shigogi oyobi Repusorudo shigogi-muro	Tōkyō	Mitaka	National Astronomical Observatory of Japan	Important Cultural Property; Registered Tangible Cultural Property		35°40′30″N 139°32′11″E	Sites/Materials	2023	
Cosmic Dust Synthesis Experiment Apparatus 星間塵合成実験装置 uchū-jin gōsei jikken sōchi	Tōkyō	Mitaka	University of Electro-Communications; University of Tokyo			35°40′31″N 139°32′20″E	Materials	2023	
Kurashiki Observatory and Related Heritage 倉敷天文台と関連遺産; Kurashiki tenmondai to kanren isan	Okayama	Kurashiki	Kurashiki Observatory; Kurashiki City			34°35′35″N 133°46′06″E	Sites/Materials	2023	
Osaka Municipal Electric Science Museum Planetarium 大阪市立電気科学館プラネタリウム; Ōsaka shiritsu denki kagaku-kan puranetarium	Ōsaka	Ōsaka	Osaka Science Museum	Municipal Tangible Cultural Property		34°41′28″N 135°29′30″E	Materials	2022	
Nishina-type Ionization Chamber 仁科型電離箱; Nishina-gata denri-bako	Saitama	Wakō	Institute of Physical and Chemical Research			35°46′50″N 139°36′45″E	Materials	2022	
Transit of Venus of Meiji 7 Observation Sites 明治7年金星太陽面通過観測地; Meiji shichi-nen Kinsei taiyō mentsūka kansoku-chi	Nagasaki, Hyōgo, Kanagawa	Nagasaki, Kobe, Yokohama	Nagasaki City, Kobe City, private individual	Prefectural Historic Site		32°45′50″N 129°52′59″E	Sites	2021	
Hisako Koyama's Sunspot Sketches 小山ひさ子氏の太陽黒点スケッチ群; Koyama Hisako-shi no taiyō kokuten suketchi-gun	Ibaraki	Tsukuba	National Museum of Nature and Science			36°06′11″N 140°06′39″E	Materials	2021	
Sendai Domain Astronomical Instruments 仙台藩天文学器機; Sendai-han tenmongaku kiki	Miyagi	Sendai	Sendai City	Important Cultural Property		38°15′25″N 140°45′19″E	Materials	2020	
Temporary Latitude Observatory Visual Zenith Telescope and Related Buildings 臨時緯度観測所眼視天頂儀及び関連建築物 rinji ido kansokujo ganshi tenchōgi oyobi kanren kenchiku-butsu	Iwate	Ōshū	Mizusawa VLBI Observatory	Registered Tangible Cultural Property		39°08′02″N 141°07′58″E	Sites/Materials	2020	
Nautical School Astronomical Observatory 商船学校天体観測所; Shōsen Gakkō tentai kansokujo	Tōkyō	Kōtō	Tokyo University of Marine Science and Technology	Registered Tangible Cultural Property		35°40′07″N 139°47′27″E	Sites	2020	
Kitora Tumulus Ceiling Mural キトラ古墳天井壁画; Kitora kofun tenjō hekiga	Nara	Asuka	MEXT	National Treasure		34°27′06″N 135°48′18″E	Materials	2019	
Total Solar Eclipse of Meiji 20—Observation Sites and Stelai 明治20年皆既日食観測地及び観測日食碑; Meiji nijū-nen kaiki nisshoku kansoku-chi oyobi kansoku nisshoku-hi	Niigata	Sanjō	Sanjō City	Municipal Historic Site		37°37′07″N 138°59′55″E	Sites	2019	
6m Millimeter-Wave Radio Telescope; 6mミリ波電波望遠鏡 roku-mētoru miri-ha denpa bōenkyō	Tōkyō	Mitaka	National Astronomical Observatory of Japan			35°40′29″N 139°32′08″E	Materials	2019	
Meigetsuki 明月記; Meigetsuki	Kyōto	Kyōto	Reizei Family Shiguretei Bunko	National Treasure		35°01′45″N 135°45′39″E	Documents	2018	
Aizu Nisshinkan Observatory Site 会津日新館天文台跡; Aizu Nisshinkan tenmondai ato	Fukushima	Aizuwakamatsu	Aizuwakamatsu Board of Education	Municipal Historic Site		37°29′22″N 139°55′27″E	Sites	2018	

== See also ==
- Cultural Properties of Japan
- Japan Heritage
