= Meigetsuki =

Heian-Kamakura era diary by Fujiwara no Teika

Meigetsuki (Record of the Brilliant Moon/Clear Moon Diary)
- 明月記
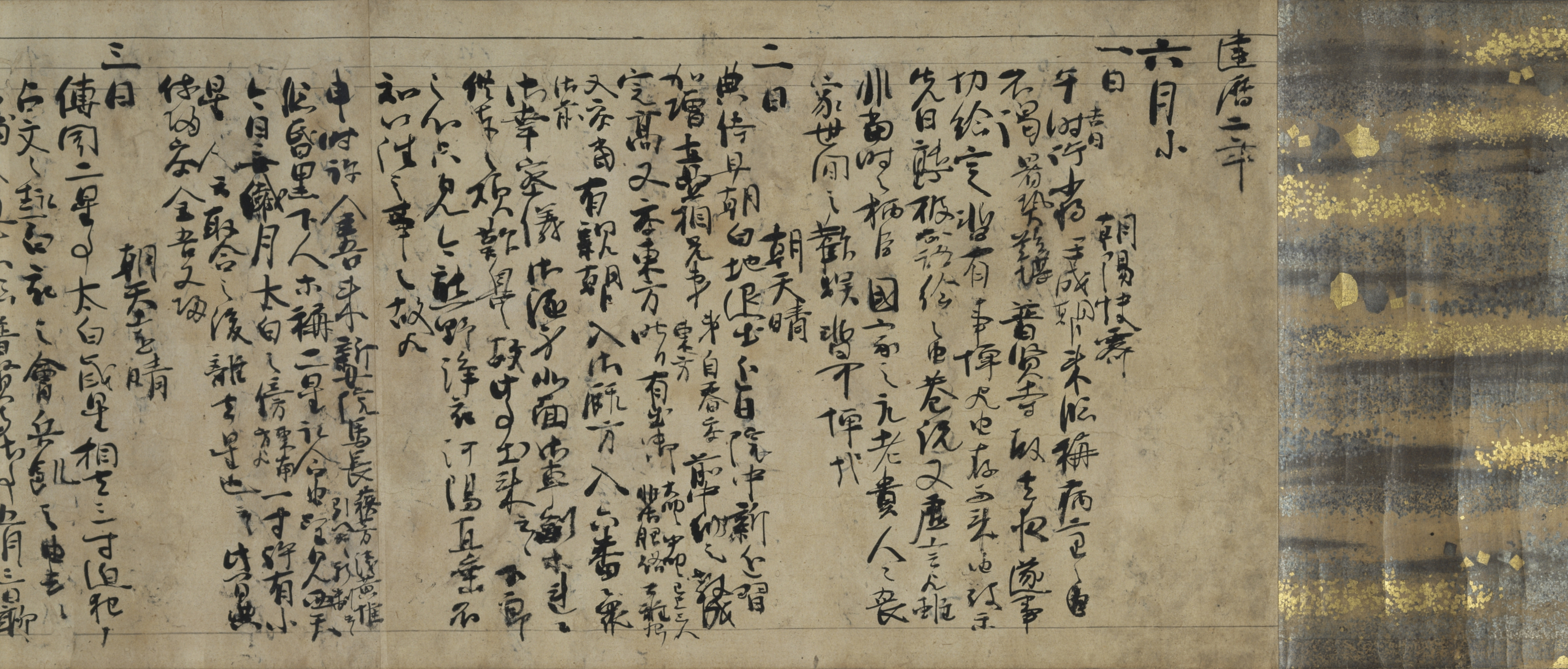
- Type: diary, handscroll
- Created: 1180-1241
- Period/culture: Heian Period - Kamakura Period
- Place: Kyoto
- Classification: National Treasure, Important Cultural Properties
- Language: Kanbun, Classical Chinese

The Meigetsuki (Japanese: 明月記, English: The Clear Moon Diary/Record of the Brilliant Moon) is a Heian-Kamakura period personal diary of the poet Fujiwara no Teika, a leading figure in Medieval Japanese poetry, and the inventor of 31-syllable waka poetry, and the compiler of the Ogura Hyakunin Isshu (Single Poems by One Hundred Poets). First started when he was at the age of 18 (1180), he kept a meticulous record of daily life, poetic activities, and regime change with the rise of the Kamakura shogunate until the eve of his death in 1241, at the age of 78-79.

Spread across multiple collections, with a majority ownership by the Reizei family, descent of the Fujiwara clan, the Reizei archive is designated a National Treasure, while many individual fragments are designated as Important Cultural Properties as they are considered a major part of Heian and Kamakura literature.

In recent years, the diary is known for its record of astronomical phenomena such as the observation of supernovas and auroras, critical to the study of solar cycles and storms, and as such was designated a Japan Astronomical Heritage asset by the Astronomical Society of Japan in 2019.

== Description ==
The historiography of Japan, starting with the Kojiki (712) and the Nihon Shoki (720) were said to have been derived of a corpus of diaries, as well as a spinoff of Chinese historiographical methodology in a similar manner to the Records of the Grand Historian. During the Heian period, the poetic diary (uta nikki) became a popular format written by the Heian court, evolved from the diaries focused on norms of the court (intended as a guide for descendants). Samples of these can include the Murasaki Shikibu Nikki or the The Pillow Book.

Starting at the age of 18, Fujiwara no Teika focused largely on writing a classic diary focusing on his daily observations. Teika referred to it casually as his "foolish diary" (guki, 愚記), though by descent through the Fujiwara clan, the Nijō family referred to it as the "Shōkōki", and the Reizei clan referred to it as the "Meigekki".

After Teika's passing, the cadet branches of the Fujiwara clan, descendants of Teika underwent several legal disputes on inheriting the estate after the passing of his son Fujiwara no Tameie in 1275, with the Nijō line represented by Nijō (Fujiwara no) Tameuji, the Kyōgoku clan represented by Fujiwara no Tamenori, and the Reizei clan represented by Fujiwara no Takasuke.

Clan extinctions, and internal turmoil continued to disperse and reduce the surviving corpus of the diary to approximately 60 scrolls by the 17th century, with 58 scrolls by 20th century. Access to the bulk of the Reizei diaries was accessible to prominent members of the Imperial family as well as Tokugawa Ieyasu, who borrowed the diary in 1614, and then had a copy commissioned by scribes from Nanzen-ji. It was on 4 April 1980, that the Reizei family archives became public, revealing the surviving bulk of the diary to the public, in addition to the archival material of the Reizei clan, housed in the two storehouses at the family residence in Imadegawa Street, in close proximity to Doshisha University.

The Reizei family Meigetsuki was recognized as a National Treasure on 27 June 2000, under designation number 00057.

== Significant entries ==
=== Astronomical observations ===
==== Auroras of 1204 ====
A paper published by the Okinawa Institute of Science and Technology in 10 April 2026 studied the solar cycles, and a spike of solar storms, documented between from the 1190s and 1200s, compiled in part by Song dynasty astronomers and Teika, who recorded the occurrences of auroras in Kyoto in February 1204.

On 1204/02/21, it was sunny. … After sunset, red vapor appeared in the direction of north and north-east. The lower part of red vapor was shaped like a rising moon and colored white and bright. Its stripes extended faraway and was like smokes in fires. There were four or five of white parts and three or four of red vapors appeared. Is it neither cloud nor stands within clouds? Its light did not get darken and red light is mixed in the white light. It is nothing but a mystery. It is also very dreadful. On 1204/02/23, it was sunny and quite windy. … In the time when to put a fire on the lamp, red vapor appeared in the north and north-east. It was like a distant mountain burning. It was very dreadful.

These observations also aligned with written testimony documented in the Omuro Sōjōki currently deposited in Ninna-ji. Carbon-14 dating of wood samples found in Aomori Prefecture confirmed the presence of solar proton activity as noticed by Teika.

=== Harvard Meigetsuki ===
The Harvard Art Museums possesses the only autograph (original) entry outside of Japan, which records the occurrences of court life on September 1226, composing of 11 sheets of paper, glued end to end. It was donated to Harvard in 1977 by Mary Eccles, Viscountess Eccles, after its ownership by her late husband Donald F. Hyde, prominent figures in the American bibliophile scene. Prior to their ownership, further provenance tracing indicates that it left the Reizei family corpus before Tokugawa Ieyasu's survey and commission of the Keichō transcription. After World War II, book dealer Sorimachi Shigeo acquired it from another dealer in 1950, and it was in 1963 that the Hyde family purchased it for 1.8 million yen ($5000). It is known that Sorimachi also had the August 1226 scroll, and that the July 1226 scroll was lost to the Bombing of Tokyo (10 March 1945).

Many of the entries that month and the phase of his life was hearsay acquired from his son Tameie, in addition to Buddhist rites as a member of the Tendai school, as well as cynical perceptions of the court environment as an elderly figure.

== Extant literature ==
National Treasures:

- Reizei Family Meigetsuki
- Record of the Imperial Pilgrimage to Kumano (October 1201, first year of Kennin): a 23 day journey undertaken by a 21-year old Emperor Go-Toba and 40-year old Teika as part of the Kumano Kodō pilgrimage. Part of the Mitsui Memorial Museum collection, it was designated a National Treasure on 15 June 1967, under designation number 00012.

Important Cultural Property (sorted by chronological order):

- 5 February to 19 December 1187 (Jishō 5), the first entries of the diary, Tenri University; declared ICP 15 June 1978 (No. 00041)
- 1st Day, 1st Month to 29th Day, 3rd Month of Kenkyū 10 (Spring 1199), Kyoto National Museum; a notable record of the Minamoto no Yoritomo's death on 9 February 1199, noted detail on the events in the court; likely autographed and annotated during his later years; declared ICP 6 June 1983 (No. 00085)
- April - May 1199 (Shōji 1), Kyushu National Museum, declared ICP 27 June 1959 (No. 00294)
- 1 July - 30 September 1200 (Shōji 2), considered the earliest surviving manuscript in Teika's handwriting, Osaka Aoyama College; declared ICP 5 June 1982 (No. 00081)
- Summer 1225 (Karoku 1), Nihon University, a valuable entry recording the Jōkyū War; declared ICP 6 September 2012 (No. 689)
- June-August 1226 (Karoku 2), Tokyo National Museum, declared ICP 6 June 1979 (No. 00047 and 00052)
- Spring 1227 (Karoku 3), Kitamura Bunka Foundation, Kyoto, declared ICP 8 February 1958 (No. 00619)
- Autumn 1228 (Antei 1), Tenri University, declared ICP 28 June 1956 (No. 00613)
- January 1230 (Kangi 2), declared ICP 8 February 1958 (No. 00327)
- Autumn 1230 (Kangi 2), declared ICP 28 June 1956 (No. 00489)
- June 1233 (Tenpuku 1), Tokyo National Museum, declared ICP 6 June 1979 (No. 00047)
- July - August 1233 (Tenpuku 1), private collection, declared ICP 19 July 1952 (No. 00270)
- November-December 1233 (Tenpuku 1), Nihon University, ICP 6 September 2012 (No. 689)

=== Others ===
- 2nd Day, 4th Month of Kennin 1 (1201), a poetry party with three boats, one for waka, one for Chinese poetry, and one for music, Nara National Museum (inv. 1239-0)
- 24 June 1199 (Shōji 1), Tokyo National Museum (B-2818)
- 26 May 1203, Kyushu National Museum
- 25 June 1211 (Kenryaku 1), recording Emperor Go-Toba's visit to Minase Shrine, Tokyo National Museum (B-3464)
- September 1226 (Karoku 2), Harvard Art Museums, acquired 1977 as a gift from Donald F. Hyde (Accession 1977.203)

== See also ==
- List of National Treasures of Japan (historical materials)
