= Paul Kletzki =

Polish conductor and composer

- Paweł Klecki
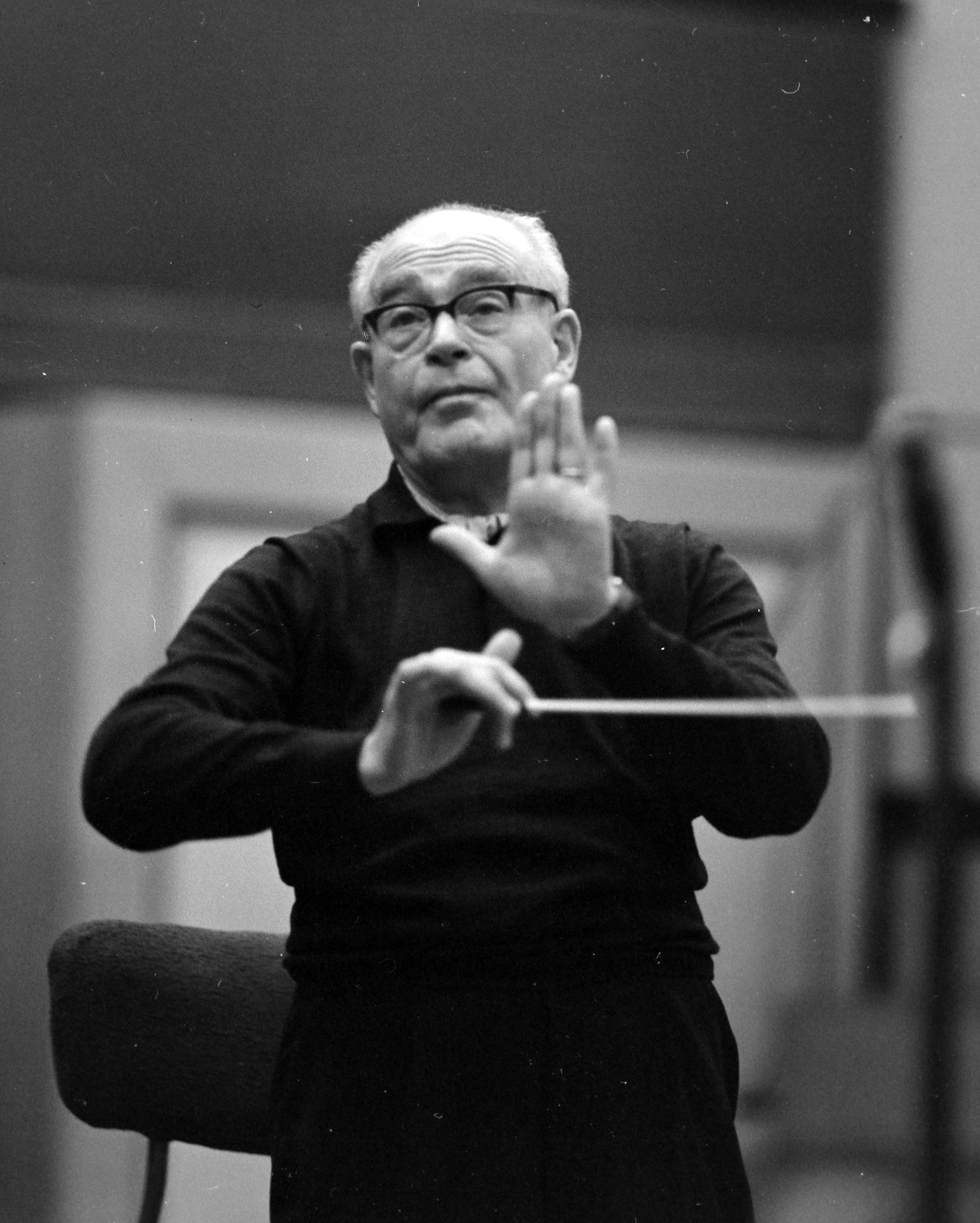
- Paul Kletzki in 1965.
- Born: 21 March 1900; Łódź, Poland
- Died: 5 March 1973 (aged 72); Liverpool, United Kingdom
- Occupation: Conductor

Paul Kletzki (born Paweł Klecki; 21 March 1900 – 5 March 1973) was a Polish conductor and composer.

== Biography ==
Paul Kletzki, 1957

Born in Łódź, Kletzki joined the Łódź Philharmonic at the age of fifteen as a violinist. After serving in the First World War, he studied philosophy at the University of Warsaw before moving to Berlin in 1921 to continue his studies. During the 1920s his compositions were championed by Arturo Toscanini; and Wilhelm Furtwängler, who permitted Kletzki to conduct the Berlin Philharmonic in 1925. Because he was Jewish, he left Nazi Germany in 1933 and moved to Milan, Italy, where he taught composition. Due to the antisemitism of the Italian Fascist regime he moved to the Soviet Union in 1936.

During the Holocaust a number of Kletzki's family were murdered by the Nazis including his parents and his sister. In 1946, he participated in the reopening of La Scala in Milan.

In 1949, he became a Swiss citizen.

In the post-war years Kletzki was a renowned conductor, especially of Gustav Mahler. In 1954 he was appointed chief conductor of the Liverpool Philharmonic Orchestra. In 1955, he conducted the first recordings of the Israel Philharmonic Orchestra. Between 1958 and 1961 he was principal conductor of the Dallas Symphony Orchestra. From 1967 until 1970 he was the general music director of the Orchestre de la Suisse Romande.

He died on 5 March 1973 at 72 years of age after collapsing during a rehearsal at the Liverpool Philharmonic Orchestra.

== Work ==
Most of Paul Kletzki's compositions were thought to be destroyed during World War II. However, during excavations in Milan in 1965, a chest was found containing the scores he had left in the basement of the Hotel Metropole in 1941. Kletzki, fearing his scores had turned to dust, did not open the chest. Upon his death in 1973 his wife, Yvonne, opened the chest finding his scores well-preserved.

Kletzki's most notable work is his Third Symphony, completed in October 1939, with the subtitle 'In memoriam'. It is an elegiac work interpreted as a moving monument to the victims of Nazism. Other works include three string quartets, a Sinfonietta for strings, a Fantasy for piano, and a sonata for violin and piano. From 1942 onwards Kletzki wrote no more compositions; he argued that Nazism had destroyed his spirit and his will to compose.

=== Recordings ===
- Piano Chamber Music, Magdalena Kling-Fender (violin); Łukasz Błaszczyk (violin); Robert Fender (cello); Adam Manijak (piano). DUX 0974 (2014)
- Piano Concerto in D minor, op.22 (1930), Joseph Banowetz (piano), Russian Philharmonic Orchestra/Thomas Sanderling. NAXOS 8.572190 (2010)
- String Quartets nos. 1 (1923), 2 (1925) and 3 (1931), Bacewicz String Quartet. Prelude Classics PCL2501000 (2026)
- Symphony No. 2 in G minor, op. 18 (1926) and Sinfonia, op. 28 (1928), Mariusz Godlewski (baritone), Polish National Radio Symphony Orchestra/Thomas Rösner. MUSIQUES SUISSES MGBCD6289 (2017)
- Violin Concerto (1928), Robert Davidovici (violin), Royal Philharmonic Orchestra/Grzegorz Nowak. RPO SP045 (2017)
- Chopin, Piano Concerto No.1, dir. Paul Kletzki, Maurizio Pollini (piano), Philharmonia Orchestra. EMI Classics.

== Compositions ==
Genre	Opus	Date	Title	Scoring	Notes
Orchestral		1921	Overture to A Florentine Tragedy by Oscar Wilde	Orchestra	Won first prize in a composition competition sponsored by the Warsaw Philharmonic, lost.
Chamber	1	1923	String Quartet in A minor	String quartet	
Vocal	2		Four Songs	Voice and piano	
Vocal	3		Three Night Songs	Voice and piano	
Piano	4	1923	Three Preludes	Piano	
Orchestral	7	1923	Sinfonietta	String orchestra	
Piano	9	1924	Fantasie in C minor	Piano	
Chamber	12	1925	Violin Sonata in D major	Violin and piano	
Chamber	13	1925	String Quartet No. 2 in C minor	String quartet	
Orchestral	14	1926	Vorspiel zu einer Tragödie	Orchestra	
Chamber	16	1924	Trio in D major	Piano, Violin and cello	
Orchestral	17	1927	Symphony No. 1	Orchestra	
Orchestral	18	1928	Symphony No. 2	Baritone and orchestra	4th movement setting of a poem by Karl Stamm Sung in German; English translation "Sleep, Sleep, O World"
Concertante	19	1928	Violin Concerto in G	Violin and orchestra	
Orchestral	20	1929	Orchestervariationen	Orchestra	
Chamber	21	1930	Introduction and Rondo	Violin and piano	
Concertante	22	1930	Piano Concerto in D minor	Piano and orchestra	Published in 2 piano 4-hand version, orchestrated by John Norine Jr.
Chamber	23	1931	String Quartet No. 3 in D minor	String quartet	
Orchestral	24	1931	Capriccio	Large orchestra	
Orchestral	25	1932	Konzertmusik	Solo winds, strings and timpani	
Violin	26	1933	Sonata for Violin Solo	Solo violin	
Chamber	28	1932	Octet		
Orchestral	30	1938	Lyric Suite	Orchestra	
Orchestral	31	1939	Symphony No. 3 ("In memoriam")	Orchestra	
Chamber	32		Trio	Flute, violin and viola	
Orchestral	33	1940	Variations sur un thème de Émile Jaques-Dalcroze	String orchestra	
Concertante	34	1940	Flute Concertino	Flute and orchestra	
Piano		1940/41	Three Unpublished Piano Pieces	Piano	
Chamber		1943	String Quartet No. 4	String quartet	Rediscovered, premiered by Merel String Quartet
