= Eine florentinische Tragödie =

Opera by Alexander von Zemlinsky

- Opera by Alexander von Zemlinsky
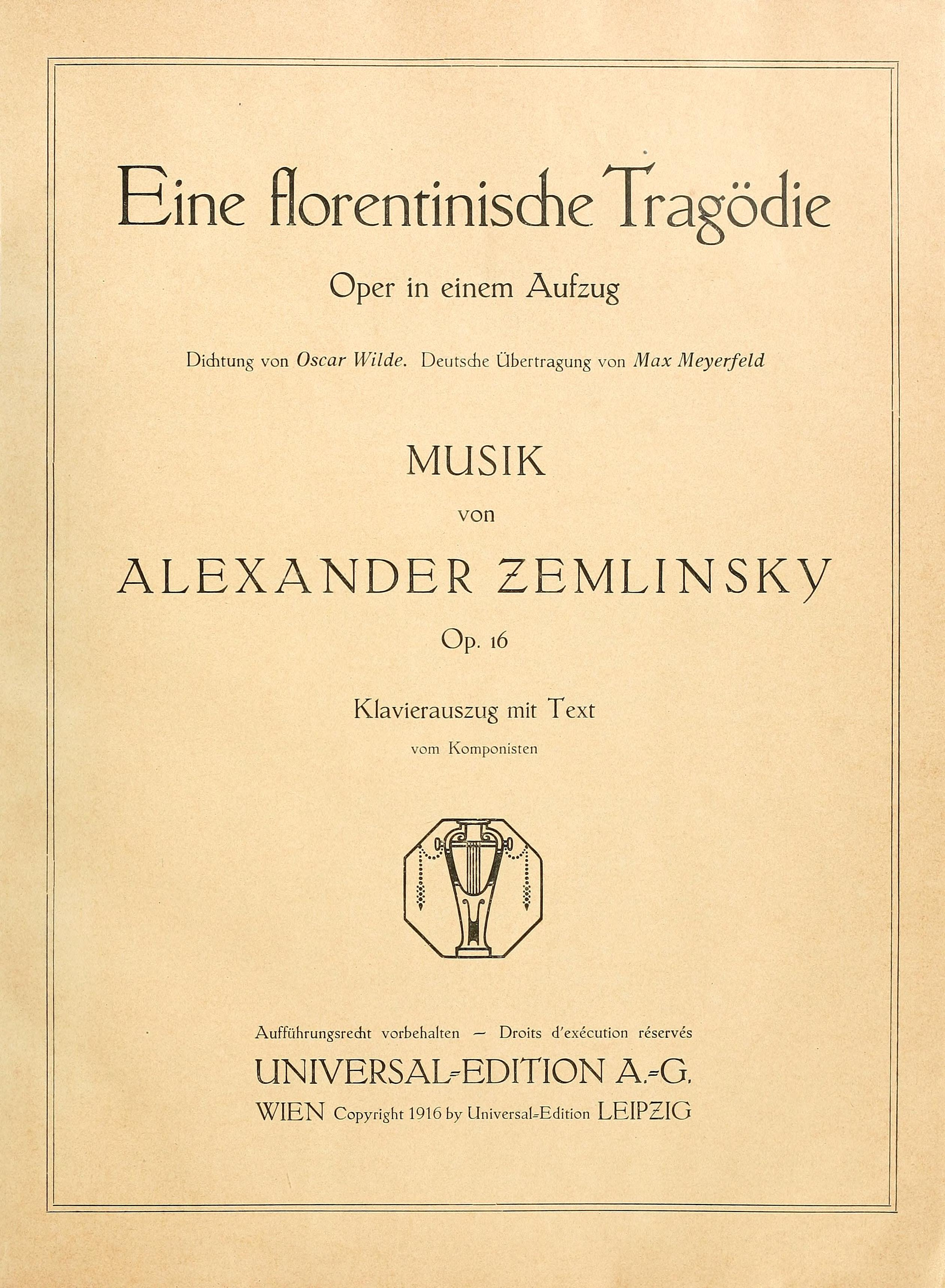
- Librettist: Zemlinsky
- Language: German
- Based on: A Florentine Tragedy by Oscar Wilde
- Premiere: 30 January 1917; Hofoper Stuttgart

Eine florentinische Tragödie, Op. 16, is an opera in one act by Alexander von Zemlinsky composed in 1915–16 to a libretto adapted by the composer from a German translation by Max Meyerfeld of Oscar Wilde's unfinished play A Florentine Tragedy.

== Performance history ==
The opera was premiered at the Staatsoper Stuttgart on 30 January 1917 under the direction of Max von Schillings. Further productions followed in Prague, Vienna and Graz the same year. The work was also staged in Leipzig (1922), Aachen (1924), Schwerin (1925), and Freiburg im Breisgau (1927). The last production during Zemlinsky's lifetime was in Brno in 1928. It lasts under one hour and is generally paired with another work when performed.

The score is published by Universal Edition Vienna.

== Roles ==
Role	Voice type	Premiere cast 30 January 1917 (Conductor: Max von Schillings)
Guido Bardi, Prince of Florence	tenor	Rudolf Ritter
Simone, a merchant	baritone	Felix Fleischer-Janczak
Bianca, his wife	soprano	Helene Wildbrunn

== Instrumentation ==
- 3 flutes (3rd doubling piccolo), 3 oboes (3rd doubling English horn), 3 clarinets in B flat/A (3rd doubling E flat clarinet), bass clarinet, 3 bassoons (3rd doubling contrabassoon);
- 6 horns, 4 trumpets, 3 trombones, bass tuba;
- timpani, percussion (cymbals, bass drum, side drum, triangle, tambourine, tam-tam, sleigh bells, xylophone, glockenspiel), harp, celesta, mandoline;
- strings

== Synopsis ==
Place: Simone's residence in Florence
Time: 16th-century

Simone, a Florentine merchant, suspects that he is being cuckolded by Prince Guido whom he discovers at home with his wife Bianca on returning from a business trip. He sells Guido a robe and offers the prince everything that he has in his house; Guido chooses Bianca. Simone takes Bianca to her room and asks her to spin, which she refuses to do. After he leaves, Bianca declares that she hates her husband and wishes him dead. Overhearing this, Simone reflects further on adultery and death. He leaves Guido and Bianca alone together and the two lovers express their devotion. When Guido is about to go home, Simone challenges him to a fight, first with swords, then with daggers, before Simone finally overcomes Guido and strangles him. Bianca, admiring her husband's strength, rushes to embrace him and the two are reconciled as the curtain falls.

== Recordings ==
[Conductor/Bianca/Guido/Simone]

- Friedrich Pleyer/Sigune Von Osten/Werner Götz/Heinz Jürgen Demitz, Fonit Cetra (1980, live at La Fenice)
- Gerd Albrecht/Doris Soffel/Kenneth Riegel/Guillermo Sarabia, Schwann (1984)
- Riccardo Chailly/Iris Vermillion/Heinz Kruse/Albert Dohmen, Decca (1996) (Note: re-released in 2003; recording made at the Concertgebouw in Amsterdam, with the Royal Concertgebouw Orchestra)
- James Conlon/Deborah Voigt/David Kuebler/Donnie Ray Albert, EMI (1997, live in Cologne)
- Armin Jordan/Iris Vermillion/Victor Lutsiuk/Albert Dohmen, Naive (2004) (Note: concert recording made at Radio France, Salle Olivier Messiaen, September 2003 with the Orchestre Philharmonique de Radio France)
- Vladimir Jurowski/Heike Wessels/Sergey Skorokhodov/Albert Dohmen, LPO (2014) (Note: Live recording Royal Festival Hall, London 26 Sep 2012)
- Bertrand de Billy/Heidi Brunner/Charles Reid/Wolfgang Koch, Capriccio (2018) (Note: Live recording Konzerthaus Wien 20 May 2010)
- Patrick Hahn/Rachael Wilson/Benjamin Bruns/Christopher Maltman, Munich Radio Orchestra, BR-Klassik (2024)
