= Tsuchimikado'in no Kosaishō =

Japanese poet

Tsuchimikado'in no Kosaishō (土御門院小宰相 also known as Jomyōmonin Kosaisho; c. 13th century) was a poet of the Kamakura period and one of the Thirty-Six Immortal Women Poets. She was the daughter of Fujiwara no Ietaka, a waka poet and junior second rank holder, and the sister of nobleman Fujiwara no Takasuke.

== Family ==
Kosaishō was the daughter of Fujiwara no Ietaka, a junior second rank holder who was the pupil of poet, courtier, and Buddhist monk Fujiwara no Shunzei. Her brother was nobleman Fujiwara no Takasuke who was also a waka poet: It is unknown who was older.

== Career ==
Kosaishō initially served under Emperor Tsuchimikado, but after he moved to Tosa Province (now known as Kōchi Prefecture) because of the Jōkyū War, she served Tsuchimikado-in's birth mother, Jōmyōmon-in Zaishi. She then served Gosaga-in, who was raised by Zaishi, and was active in the Gosaga-in poetry circle. Kosaishō left behind works in imperial anthologies and poetry contests after the Shinchokusen Wakashu. She participated in the August 15th Night Poetry Contest in 1265.

Although Kosaishō herself was not from the generation that was active in the poetry circles of Emperor Go-Toba, she submitted ten poems to the Entou Go-Uta-awase (Poetry Contest on Islands): Emperor Go-Toba, while exiled to Oki, asked fifteen poets in the capital to submit ten poems on ten themes, adding his own poems and signatures to create a total of eighty poems. Along with her father Ietaka and her brother Ryusuke, she also submitted ten poems.

In the October poetry contest of the first year of the Hōji era, Kosaishō's poem reads:

"May Cuckoo" by Tsuchimikadoin, Minister of the Left. The unforgettable past seems far away, and this year's winter is once again shimmering with dreary breeze.— Shoku Kokin Wakashu, Volume 3, Summer Poems

Emperor Go-Toba praised the poem, saying, "It is a gentle presence."

=== Anecdote ===
One day, Emperor Go-Saga fell in love at first sight with a beautiful woman he saw at a kemari party. After desperately searching for her, he discovered she was the wife of a shosho (minister general) and sent her a love letter. The love letter was returned with just the single character wo (を) added to the end. The emperor was confused and didn't understand the meaning of the letter, but Kosaisho (minister of state) quoted the story of Koshikibu no Naishi and explained that it probably meant "she will come when night falls," so the emperor waited with peace of mind. Sure enough, just as Kosaisho predicted, the beautiful woman, the shosho's wife, came to see the emperor late at night.

== Books cited ==
- Katagiri, Yoichi, "Otori Kazuma's Study of the Poetry of Shomeimon'in Shozaisho," The Essence and Transformation of Imperial Literature, Izumi Shoin Research Series 276, 277, 2001. ISBN 4757601379. NCID BA54515223. National Bibliography Number: 20226976.
- Fujikawa, Isao, "Rethinking the Kageku Poetry Contest on the Thirteenth Night of September, Year 3 of Kencho," Study of Japanese Literature, No. 192-193, Hiroshima University Society of Japanese Language and Literature, March 2007, pp. 11–22, ISSN 0287-3362, NAID 120000879767.
- Ito, Kunio, "Possibilities for Research on Medieval Poetry Contests," Onomichi University Japanese Literature Review, Special Edition, Onomichi University Japanese Literature Society, December 2010, pp. 99–110, doi:10.18899/nic.bet.05, ISSN 1880-215X, NAID 120005377169.
- Yasui, Hisayoshi, The Hōji Ninen-in Hyakushu and Its Research, Kasama Shoin, 1971. doi:10.11501/6063437. NCID BN02469792. NDLJP:6063437. National Bibliography Number:75018977
