= Takasuke =

- Gender: Male

Origin
- Origin: Japanese
- Meaning: Different meanings depending on the kanji used

Takasuke (written: 崇介, 鷹介 or 隆祐) is a masculine Japanese given name. Notable people with the name include:

- Fujiwara no Takasuke (藤原 隆祐; died 1251), Japanese poet
- Takasuke Goto (後藤 崇介; born 1985), Japanese footballer
- Takasuke Kume (久米 鷹介; born 1985), Japanese mixed martial artist
