= Robert Borthwick Adam =

Scotland-born American retailer and book collector (1833–1904)

- Born: February 4, 1833; Peebles, Scotland
- Died: June 30, 1904 (aged 71)
- Occupation: department store owner
- Known for: book collecting
- Spouse: Grace Harriet Michie

Robert Borthwick Adam (February 4, 1833 – June 30, 1904) was a retailer and book collector from Buffalo, New York. In 1867, Adam co-founded the department store Adam, Meldrum & Whiting. Adam's home at 448 Delaware Avenue in Buffalo, built in 1876, still stands.

== Biography ==
Adam was born in Peebles, Scotland, on February 4, 1833, to Rev. Thomas Adam and Isabella Borthwick. He left school at the age of 10 and went to work in Edinburgh, where he lived until 1857. In 1855, he married Grace Harriet Michie. In 1857, Adam left Scotland for the United States. He first settled in Boston and moved to Buffalo in 1867. In 1872, Adam adopted his nephew Robert Borthwick Adam Scott (1863-1940), who then took the name Robert Borthwick Adam. Among's Adam's philanthropic activities were a longstanding involvement with the Buffalo YMCA which he served as President from 1897 until his death on June 30, 1904.

== As a collector ==
In the 1880s, Adam began collecting rare books and manuscripts related to English Literature, with a particular focus on Samuel Johnson. The collection passed to his son, who continued to add to it. In 1931, the scholar L.F. Powell called the collection "unrivalled and without a competitor."

The collection was purchased by Donald and Mary Hyde in 1948 and now forms part of the Hyde Collection at Houghton Library, Harvard University.
