= Mary Eccles, Viscountess Eccles =

English book collector and author (1912–2003)

Mary Eccles
- Born: Mary Morley Crapo; 8 July 1912; Detroit, Michigan, U.S.
- Died: 26 August 2003 (aged 91); Branchburg, New Jersey, U.S.
- Education: Vassar College; Columbia University (MA, PhD)
- Occupations: Book collector; author
- Years active: 1941–2003
- Spouses: Donald F. Hyde (m. 1939; died 1966); David Eccles (m. 1984; died 1999)
- Relatives: Henry H. Crapo (great-grandfather)

Mary Morley Eccles, Viscountess Eccles (née Crapo; 8 July 1912 – 26 August 2003) was an American-British book collector and author. She was renowned for establishing one of the largest private collections of 18th century literature with her first husband, Donald Hyde. This includes works from Samuel Johnson and James Boswell. She also created an Oscar Wilde Collection which was bequeathed to the British Library in 2003. An obituary described her as 'one of the great American collectors of the last century, combining wealth, scholarship, and sensibility in a way that became rare to the point of extinction in her lifetime'.

== Early life and education ==
Eccles was born Mary Morley Crapo in Detroit, Michigan, in 1912, to American railway executive Stanford T. Crapo (grandson of Governor Henry H. Crapo) and wife Emma Caroline Morley. She attended Vassar College, where she became friends with novelist Mary McCarthy. She later attended Columbia University where she undertook an MA and PhD in English literature. The dissertation from her doctorate was later developed into a book, entitled Playwriting for Elizabethans.

== Literary collections ==
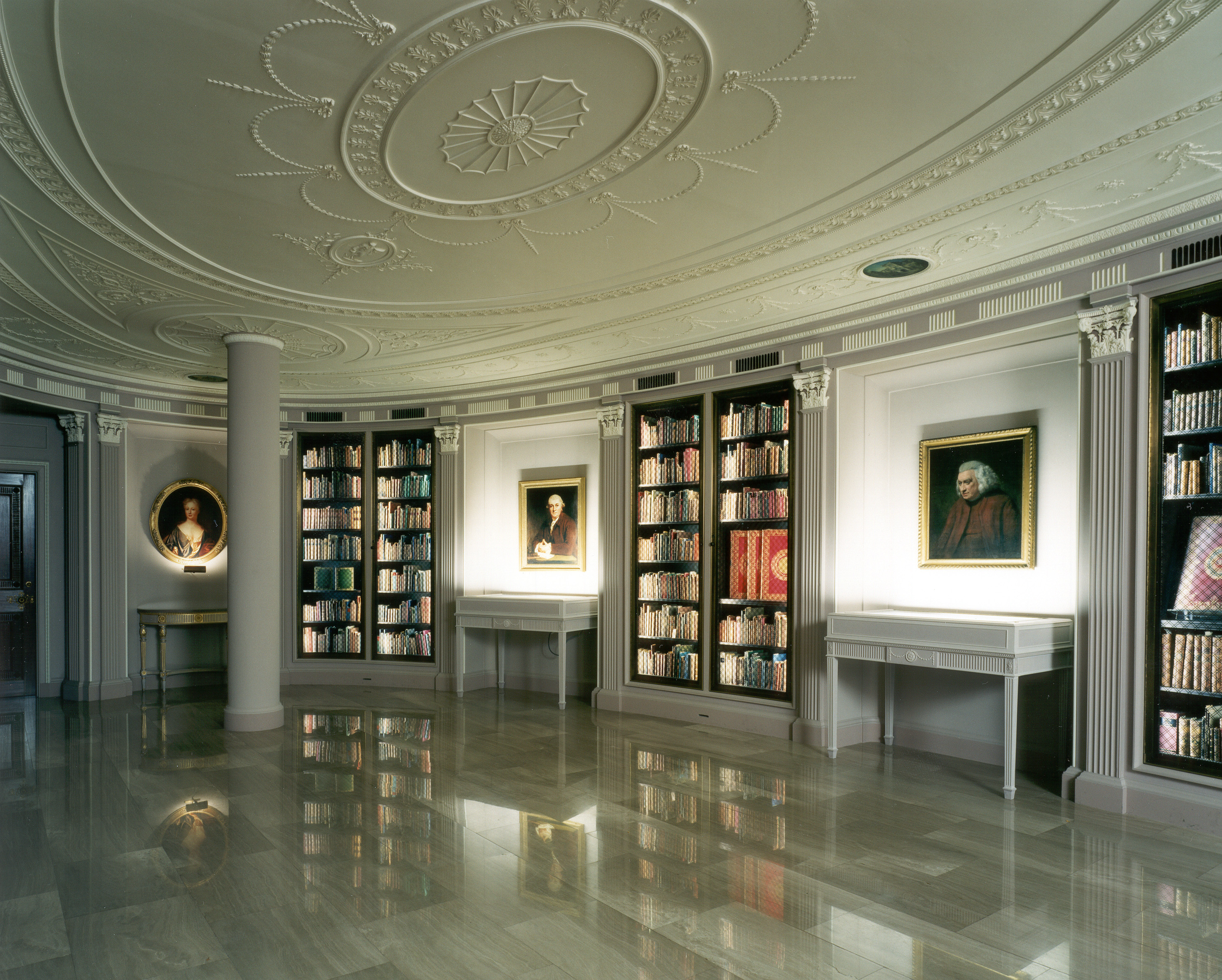
The Hyde Room at Houghton Library, Harvard University

In 1939 she married Donald Hyde, a New York City lawyer. The couple bought Samuel Johnson's silver teapot in 1941 and threw a tea party in its honour. Over the next 25 years, they became avid collectors of Johnson's belongings, including hundreds of his letters, several of his diaries and a collection of his poems.

Mary Hyde — as she was then known—bought Four Oaks Farm in Branchburg, New Jersey in 1943. Here they bought up surrounding land and added a library to the property, filling the house with their Samuel Johnson collection. Hyde also published The Thrales of Streatham Park in honour of Mrs Hester Thrale who had previously collected many of Johnson's belongings. During the following years, Hyde became well acquainted with many influential figures, including business tycoons, politicians and English aristocrats. Among them was businessman Robert Borthwick Adam, from whom she purchased a portion of her collection.

Donald Hyde died in 1966. His wife later wrote The Impossible Friendship, a study of Mrs Thrale and James Boswell. She also wrote Bernard Shaw and Alfred Douglas: A Correspondence and developed an Oscar Wilde collection that was second in size only to that of the University of California. She donated this collection to the British Library to form the Lady Eccles Oscar Wilde Collection there. The collection relating to Samuel Johnson and his circle was bequeathed to Houghton Library at Harvard University.

== Art collections ==
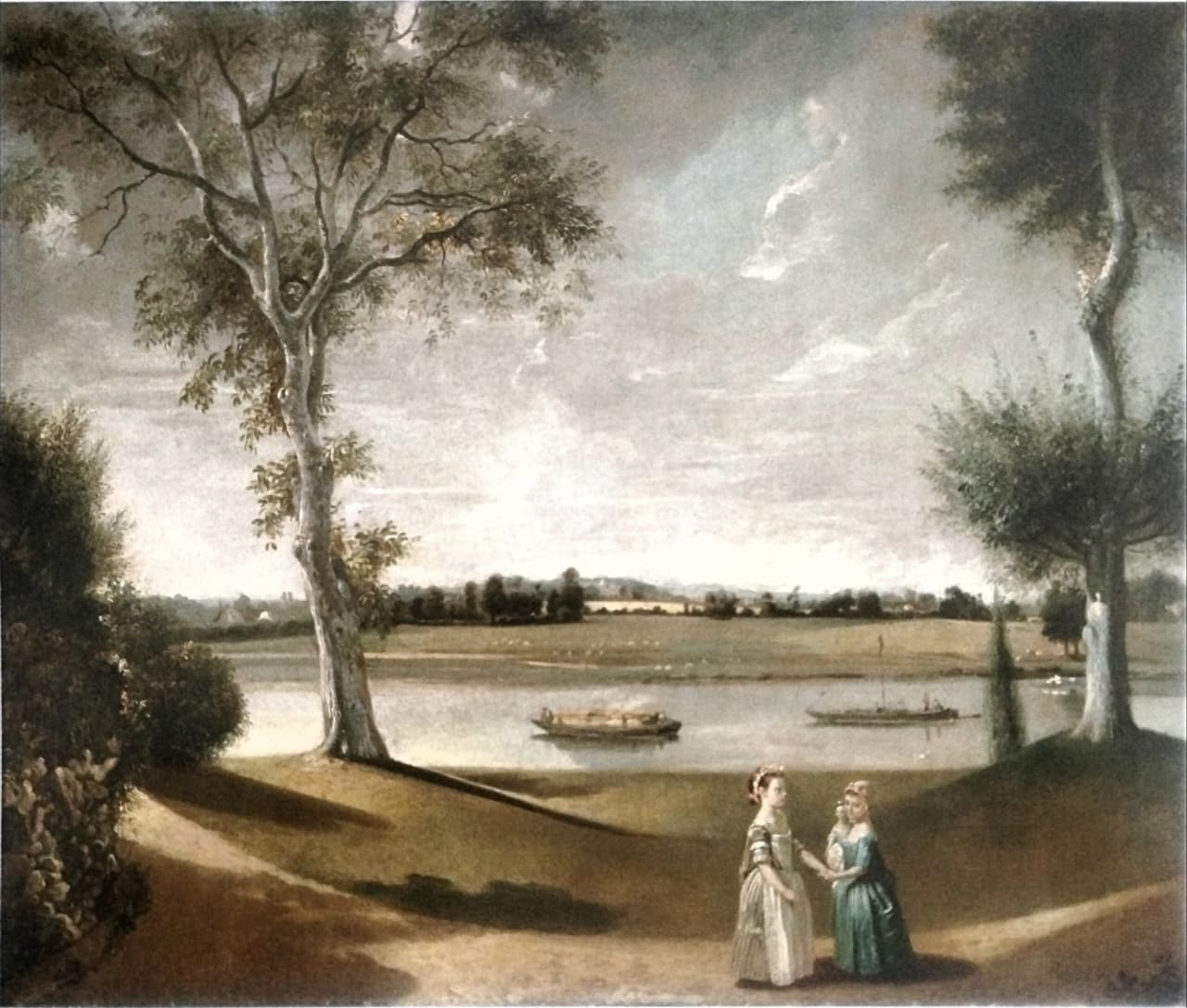
The Misses Garrick by the Thames at Hampton by Johann Zoffany (1733–1810)

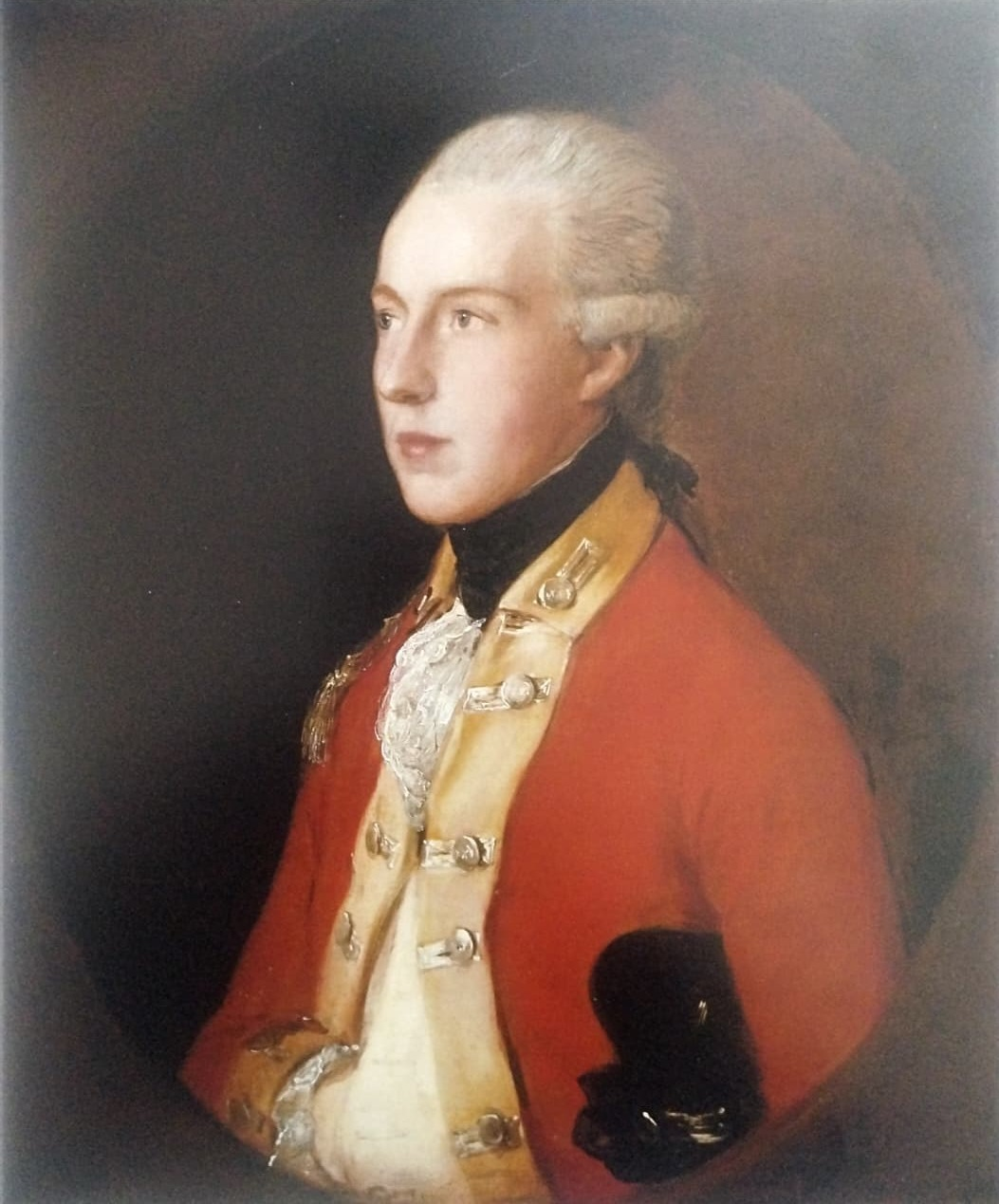
Captain John Stanley by Thomas Gainsborough

While Lady Eccles private library was most likely her principal focus of interest she also, over a dedicated sixty years of collecting, assembled a collection of eighteenth-century British pictures. These included standouts like The Misses Garrick by Johann Zoffany and Captain John Stanley by Thomas Gainsborough.

== Later years ==
Mary Hyde married David Eccles, 1st Viscount Eccles in 1984, becoming The Right Honourable The Viscountess Eccles. They founded the Eccles Centre for American Studies at the British Library in 1992 as Lord Eccles had previously been its chairman.

Lady Eccles died at Four Oaks Farm on 26 August 2003, aged 91. At the time of her death, she had been working on a book.

== Honours ==
Lady Eccles was made an Honorary Fellow of Samuel Johnson's college at Oxford, Pembroke College. She was also Benjamin Franklin Fellow of the Royal Society of Arts. In 1976 Mary Hyde became one of the first women members of the Grolier Club. She was a member of The Roxburghe Club, an exclusive society of bibliophiles, from 1985 to 2003. She was also an elected member of the American Philosophical Society (1978).
