= Reginald Turner =

English writer (1869–1938)

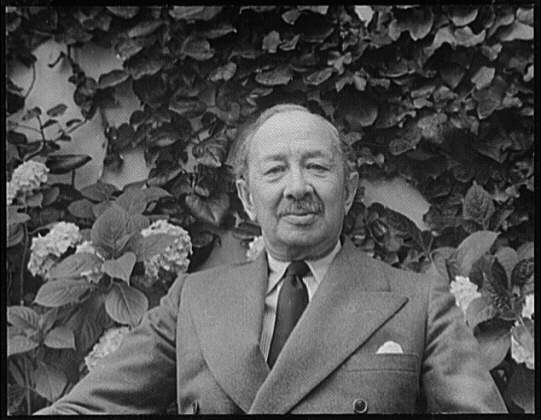
Reginald Turner by Carl Van Vechten (1935)

Reginald Turner (2 June 1869 – 7 December 1938) was an English author, an aesthete and a member of the circle of Oscar Wilde. He worked as a journalist, wrote twelve novels, and his correspondence has been published, but he is best known as one of the few friends who remained loyal to Wilde when he was imprisoned and who supported him after his release.

In Rupert Everett‘s biopic of Wilde, The Happy Prince, he is portrayed by Colin Firth.

== Biography ==
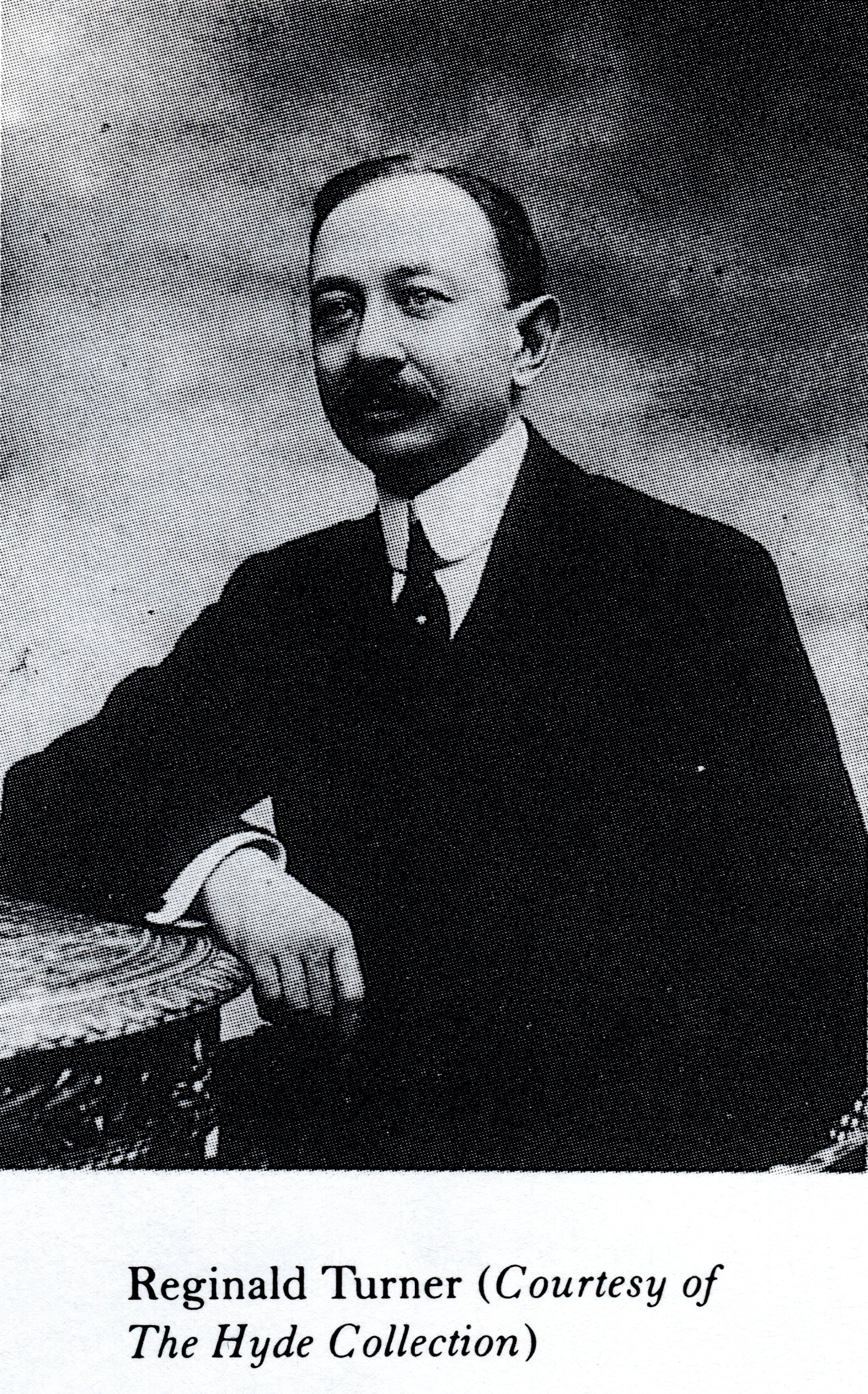
Reginald Turner

Turner never knew who his parents were, but was an illegitimate member of, and raised by, the Levy-Lawson family, owners of the newspaper, The Daily Telegraph. He was educated at Hurstpierpoint College in West Sussex and Merton College, Oxford. On leaving Oxford he trained briefly as a barrister under Travers Humphreys, but was too lazy for the Law; having a leaning towards writing he joined The Daily Telegraph, where he inaugurated the paper's gossip column. Between 1901 and 1911 he published a dozen novels. None of them made a great impression – Turner observed that it was not his first editions that were scarce, but his second ones, although at least three of his novels were reprinted. His biographer, Stanley Weintraub, comments that the circumstances of Turner's birth, reminiscent of H.M.S. Pinafore and The Importance of Being Earnest, are reflected in his fiction, sometimes humorously and sometimes seriously.

Max Beerbohm's Letters to Reggie Turner with Beerbohm's caricature of Turner

Turner numbered among his friends Max Beerbohm, Lord Alfred Douglas, H. G. Wells, Arnold Bennett, Somerset Maugham, D. H. Lawrence, Oscar Wilde, Osbert Sitwell and others of the London literary scene during the late 19th and early 20th century. S. N. Behrman said of him, "He was one of those men who talk like angels and write like pedestrians". Harold Acton agreed, writing of Turner's conversation, "One forgot to eat while he spun his fantasies." Beerbohm wrote that he "would be eloquent even were he dumb," because "[h]is face is a great part of his equipment," and Maugham wrote, "Reggie Turner was, on the whole, the most amusing man I have known."

Turner's novels contain portraits of his contemporaries and of himself ("Reginald Cobbler," in Castles in Kensington). Others whom he sketched in his novels were Henry James, Ada Leverson, Bernard Berenson, Joseph Duveen, and Anthony Hope. Osbert Sitwell put a comic version of Turner as "Algy Braithwaite" into his verses On the Continent: "wherever he went, he carried with him / The atmosphere of London in the 1890s." Turner was also the model for the character "little Algy Constable" in Lawrence's novel Aaron's Rod.

Turner was one of the very few of the old circle who remained with Wilde after his release from prison, and he was at his bedside when he died. Beerbohm relates how, a few days before Wilde's death, Turner had found Wilde very depressed after a nightmare. "I dreamt that I had died, and was supping with the dead!" said Wilde. "I am sure", Turner replied, "that you must have been the life and soul of the party." Turner, with Robbie Ross and Frank Harris, supported Wilde to the end. After Wilde's trial Ross lost contact with Cyril and Vyvyan, Wilde's sons. At his first meeting with Vyvyan Holland (as Wilde's son was now named) Ross was accompanied by Beerbohm and Turner – "a highly emotional meeting," Holland later recalled.

Oscar Wilde's correspondence with Reginald Turner forms the basis of The Lady Eccles Oscar Wilde Collection at the British Library, later much augmented with material from other sources.

After Wilde's death, Turner, who was homosexual, felt few ties to England. Weintraub writes, "He felt alienated from an England which had driven Oscar to his death, and realised that some of the hostility toward Wilde might now continue to be directed toward those who had stood by him, and were similarly suspect." Turner thereafter lived abroad for much of the time. His royalties from his novels were modest, but together with his income from the Levy-Lawson family, they supported him in Paris and in French resorts. In his later years he lived in Florence, where he died at the age of 69 and was buried in the Cimitero Evangelico degli Allori.

== Turner's novels ==
- Cynthia's Damages. A story of the stage (1901). Greening & Co, London
- The Comedy of Progress – A novel (1902). Greening & Co
- Castles in Kensington (1904). Greening & Co
- Dorothy Raeburn – A novel (1905). Greening & Co
- Peace on Earth – A novel (1905). Alston Rivers, London
- The Steeple – A novel (1905). Greening & Co
- Davry's Affairs (1906). Greening & Co
- Uncle Peaceable – A comedy (1906). Greening & Co
- Imperial Brown of Brixton (1908). Chapman & Hall, London
- Samson Unshorn (1909). Chapman & Hall
- Count Florio and Phyllis K. (1910). Chapman & Hall
- King Philip the Gay (1911). Greening & Co
