= Lady Eccles Oscar Wilde Collection =

British Library special collection

Coordinates: 51.5304°N 0.1281°W

The Lady Eccles Oscar Wilde Collection is a special collection of materials by, about and associated with the novelist and playwright Oscar Wilde, donated to the British Library in 2003 by Lady Eccles.

== Contents ==
The Eccles collection contains over 1500 printed books, manuscripts and pieces of ephemera relating to Oscar Wilde and his associates. It is rich in first editions, with a significant number of books formerly owned by Wilde. It includes all of his published works, periodicals, translations, privately printed editions, piracies, biographical texts and ephemera as well as manuscripts and autograph letters.

Highlights include presentation copies from Wilde himself, many with personal inscriptions. Wilde inscribed a copy of The Ballad of Reading Gaol (1898), for example, to his friend "Willie Callan, in affection and admiration, from his friend, who wrote this Ballad of Pain. Paris, '98'. Other recipients of presentation copies include Lady Wilde (Oscar Wilde's mother), Bosie (Lord Alfred Douglas) and Robert Browning. There are also some extremely rare editions of limited print runs, such as Vera; or the Nihilists (1880), of which only two copies are known to survive.

== History ==
Lady Eccles assembled the collection by acquiring other large Wilde collections, including the correspondence between Wilde and his friend Reginald Turner, H. Montgomery Hyde's Wilde collection and later additions from the libraries of Mortimer L. Schiff and Lord Alfred Douglas.

Now at the British Library, printed material in the collection has the pressmark 'Eccles 1", etc and the manuscripts have the pressmark range Add.MS.81619-81884.

== See also ==
- Works of Oscar Wilde
