= De Profundis (letter) =

1897 letter written by Oscar Wilde

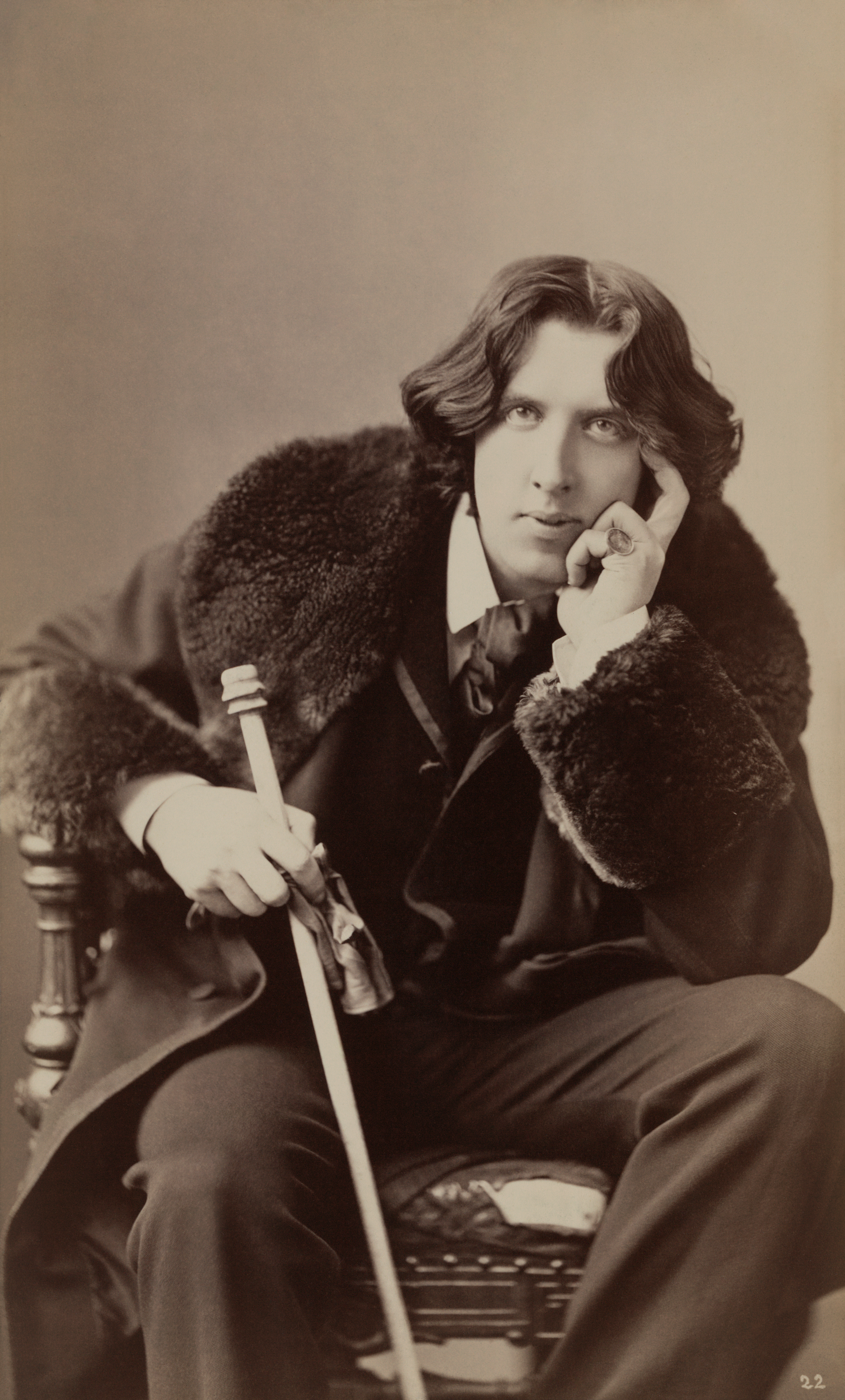
Oscar Wilde

De Profundis (Latin: "from the depths") is a letter written by Oscar Wilde during his imprisonment in Reading Gaol, to his friend and lover Lord Alfred "Bosie" Douglas.

In its first half, Wilde recounts their previous relationship and extravagant lifestyle which resulted eventually in Wilde's conviction and imprisonment for gross indecency. He indicts both Lord Alfred's vanity and his own weakness. In the second half, Wilde charts his spiritual development in prison and identification with Jesus Christ, whom he characterizes as a romantic, individualist artist. The letter begins "Dear Bosie" and ends "Your Affectionate Friend".

Wilde wrote the letter between January and March 1897, close to the end of his imprisonment. Contact had lapsed between Douglas and Wilde and the latter had suffered from his close supervision, physical labour, and emotional isolation. Nelson, the new prison governor, thought that writing might be more cathartic than prison labour. He was not allowed to send the long letter which he was allowed to write "for medicinal purposes"; each page was taken away when completed, and only at the end could he read it over and make revisions. Nelson gave the long letter to him on his release on 18 May 1897.

Wilde entrusted the manuscript to the journalist Robert Ross (another former lover, loyal friend, and rival to "Bosie"). Ross published the letter in 1905, five years after Wilde's death, giving it the title "De Profundis" from Psalm 130. It was an incomplete version, excised of its autobiographical elements and references to the Queensberry family; various editions gave more text until in 1962 the complete and correct version appeared in a volume of Wilde's letters.

== Background ==
=== Trials ===
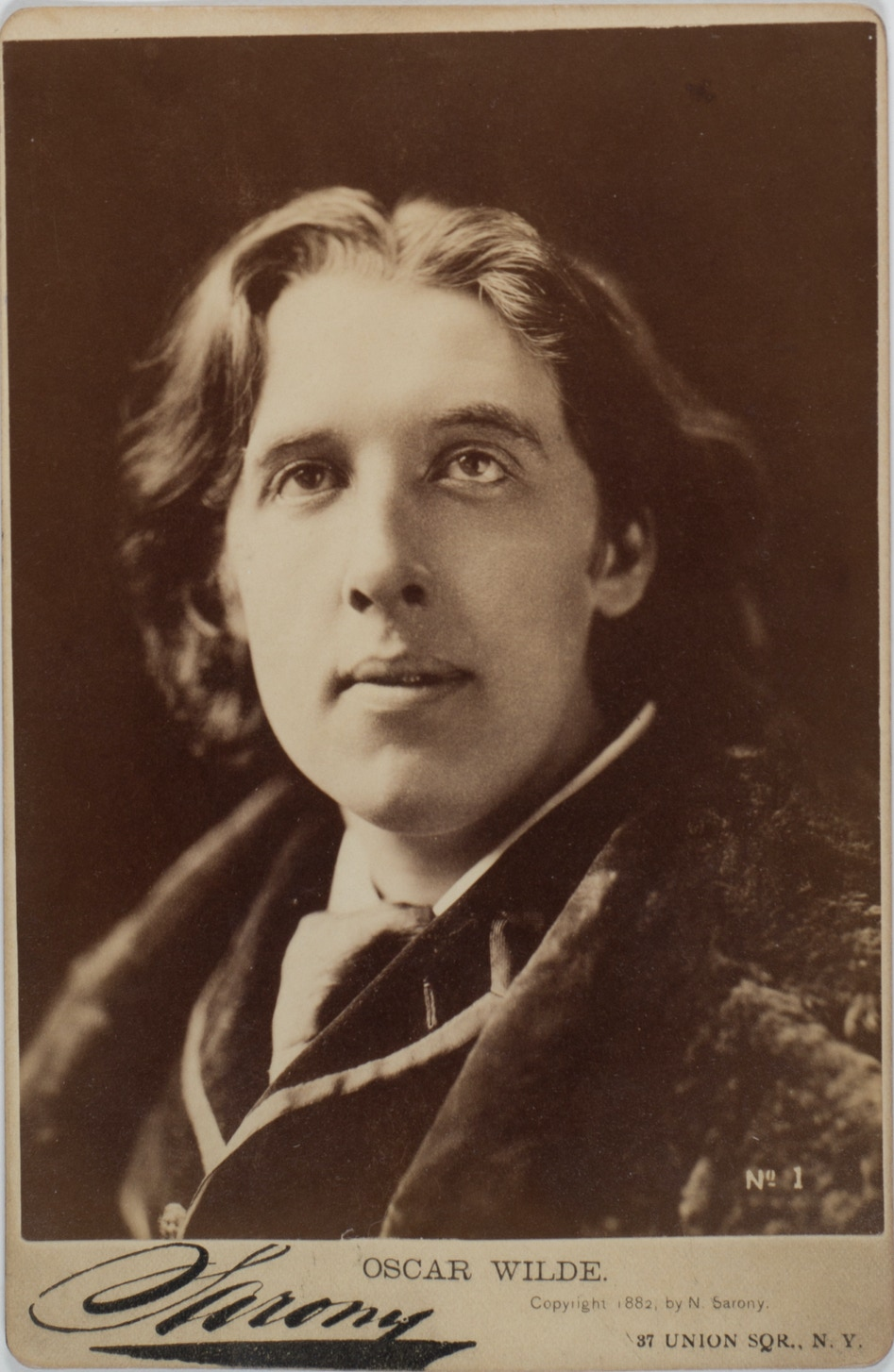
Oscar Wilde in New York in 1882; by 1897 he had lost much weight after a year and a half in prison.

In 1891, Wilde began his intimate friendship with Lord Alfred Douglas, a young, vain aristocrat. As the two grew closer, family and friends on both sides urged Wilde and Douglas to lessen their friendship. Lord Alfred's father, the Marquess of Queensberry, often argued with his son about the topic. Especially after the suicide death of his eldest son, the Viscount Drumlanrig, Queensberry privately accused them of improper acts and threatened to end Lord Alfred's allowance. When they refused, he began publicly harassing Wilde. During early 1895 Wilde had become famous and successful with his plays An Ideal Husband and The Importance of Being Earnest on stage in London. When Wilde returned from holidays after the premieres, he found Queensberry's card at his club with the inscription: "For Oscar Wilde, posing somdomite [sic]". (Note: Queensberry's handwriting was almost indecipherable: The hall porter initially read "ponce and sodomite", but Queensberry himself claimed that he'd written "posing 'as' a sodomite", an easier accusation to defend in court. Merlin Holland concludes that "what Queensberry almost certainly wrote was "posing somdomite [sic]", (Holland (2004:300)))

Indignant about the insult and encouraged by Lord Alfred (who wanted to attack his father in every possible way), Wilde sued Queensberry for criminal libel. Wilde withdrew his claim as the defence began, but the Judge deemed that Queensberry's accusation was justified. The Crown promptly issued a warrant for Wilde's arrest and he was charged with gross indecency with other men by the Labouchere Amendment in April 1895. The trial was a matter of public discussion as details of Wilde's consorts from the working class became known. Wilde refused to admit wrongdoing and the jury were unable to reach a verdict. At the retrial Wilde was sentenced to two years' imprisonment, with hard labour.

=== Imprisonment ===
He was imprisoned in Pentonville, Wandsworth, and Reading Prisons, where poor food, manual labour, and harsh conditions weakened his health. He quickly began suffering from hunger, insomnia, and disease. He was visited in Pentonville by R. B. S. Haldane, a liberal, reforming MP whom he had known previously. Haldane championed his case and arranged for access to religious, educational, and historical books. Whilst in Wandsworth, Wilde collapsed in the Chapel and burst his right ear drum, an injury that would later contribute to his death. He spent two months recovering in the infirmary. Friends arranged for him to be transferred to Reading Prison, where he was prescribed lighter duties and allowed to spend some time reading but not writing. Depressed, he was unable to complete even these duties; the Warden of Reading Prison was the strict Colonel Isaacson, and Wilde received a series of harsh punishments for trivial offences. The failure to complete them resulted in renewed sanction.

Wilde, who still loved Lord Alfred, became troubled as communication from him became rare, then annoyed when he learned that the latter planned to publish Wilde's letters without permission and dedicate poems to him unasked. He wrote to friends immediately, forbidding the former and refusing the latter. Wilde still maintained his belief that the Queensberrys owed him a debt of honour as a result of his bankruptcy trial.

=== Composition ===
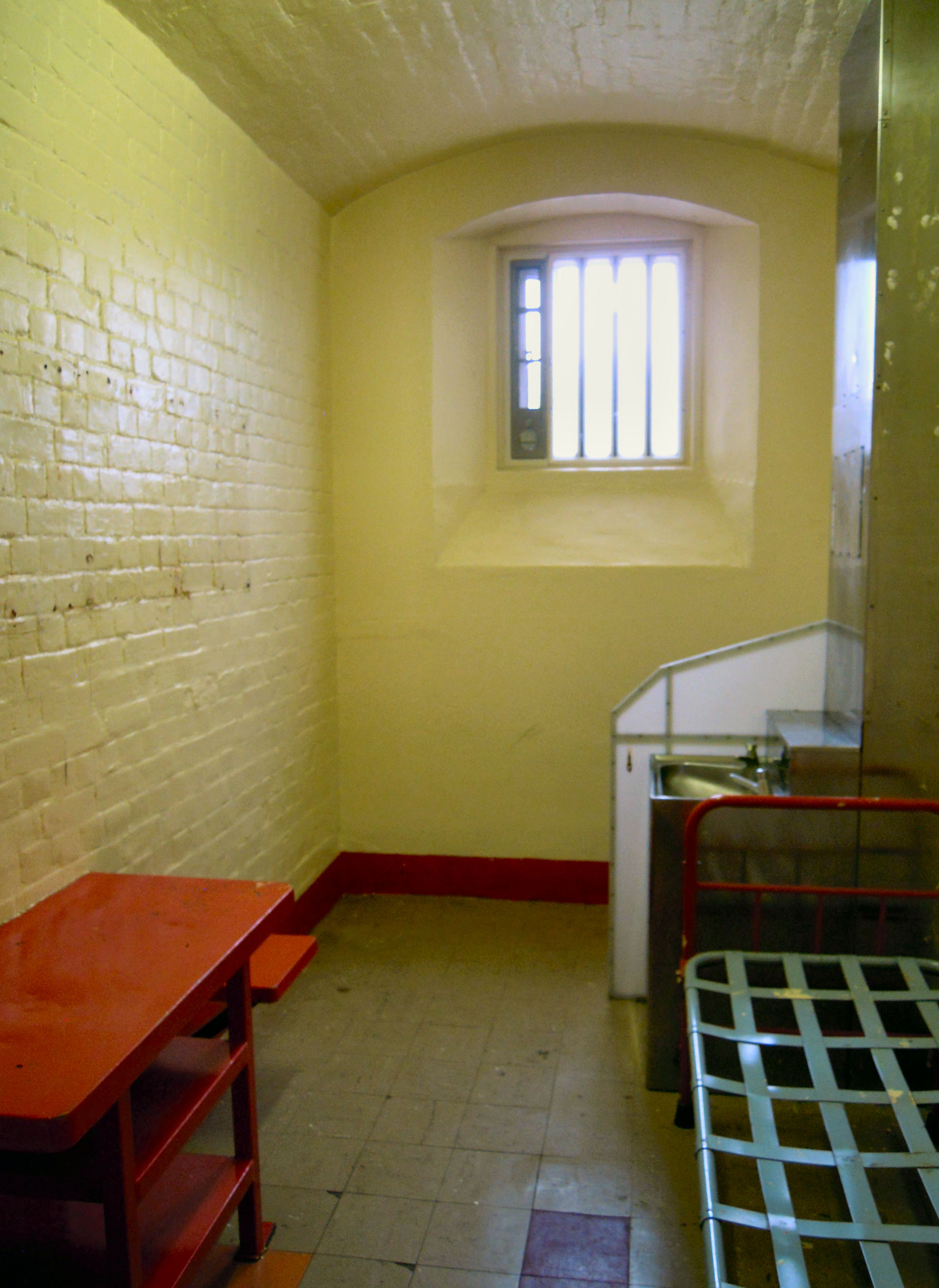
Wilde's cell in Reading Gaol where he wrote De Profundis – as it appears presently (2016).

Wilde's friends continued advocating for better conditions and, in 1897, Major Nelson, a man of a more progressive mind, replaced Col. Isaacson as Warden. He quickly visited Wilde and offered him a book from his personal library, the sympathy bringing Wilde to tears. Soon Wilde requested lists of books, returning to Ancient Greek poets and Christian theology, and studying modern Italian and German, though it was Dante's Inferno that gained his attention.

Wilde was granted official permission to have writing materials during early 1897, but even then controlled strictly: he could write to his friends and his solicitor, but only one page at a time. Wilde decided to write a letter to Douglas, and in it discuss the last five years they had spent together, creating an autobiography of sorts. Wilde spent January, February, and March 1897 writing his letter. Textual analysis of the manuscript shows that Nelson probably relaxed the stringent rules, allowing Wilde to see the papers together: three of the sheets are of relatively fair copy, suggesting they were entirely re-written, and most do not end with a full-stop. Wilde requested that he might send the letter to Lord Alfred Douglas or Robert Ross, which the Home Office denied, but he was permitted to take it with him on release. Wilde never revised the work after he left prison.

== Structure and content ==
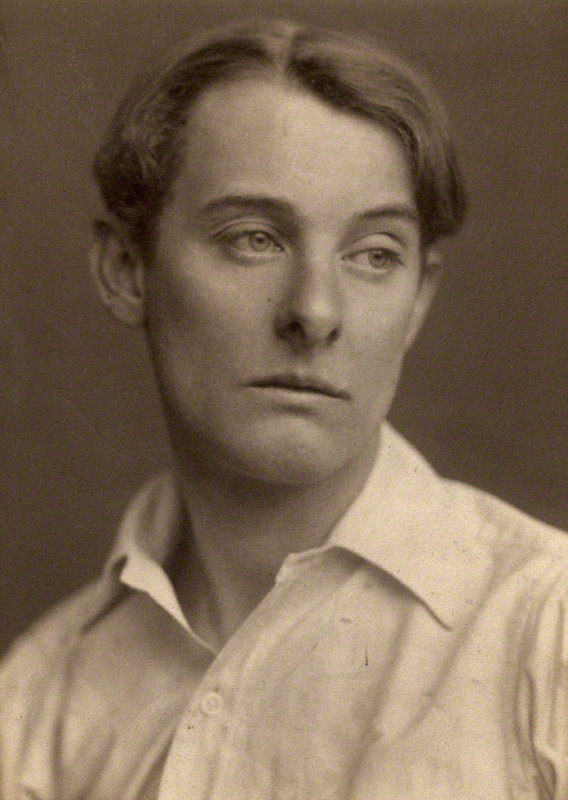
Lord Alfred Douglas, to whom De Profundis is addressed.

HM Prison, Reading

Dear Bosie,

After long and fruitless waiting I have determined to write to you myself, as much for your sake as for mine, as I would not like to think that I had passed through two long years of imprisonment without ever having received a single line from you, or any news or message even, except such as gave me pain [...]

=== First part: Wilde's account of time with Douglas ===
Wilde's work was written as a prose letter on eighty sheets of prison paper. It contains no formal divisions (save paragraphs) and is addressed and signed off as a letter. Scholars have distinguished a noticeable change of style, tone and content in the latter half of the letter, when Wilde addresses his spiritual journey in prison. In the first part, Wilde examines the time he and Lord Alfred had spent together, from 1892 until Wilde's trials in the spring of 1895. He examines Lord Alfred's behaviour and its detrimental effect on Wilde's work, and recounts Lord Alfred's constant demands on his attention and hospitality. Poignancy builds throughout this section as Wilde details the expenses of their sumptuous dinners and hotel-stays, many costing more than £1,000; it culminates in an account of Douglas's rage in Brighton whilst Wilde was ill. Though he was a constant presence at Wilde's side, their relationship was sterile intellectually. Throughout Wilde's self-accusation is that he acceded to these demands instead of placing himself within quiet, intellectual company dedicated to the contemplation of beauty and ideas, but instead succumbed to an "imperfect world of coarse uncompleted passions, of appetite without distinction, desire without limit, and formless greed". This passage concludes with Wilde offering his forgiveness to Douglas. He repudiates him for what Wilde finally considers as his arrogance and vanity; he had not forgotten Douglas's remark, when he was ill, "When you are not on your pedestal you are not interesting".

=== Second part: Christ as a romantic artist ===
The second part of the letter traces Wilde's spiritual growth through the physical and emotional hardships of his imprisonment. Wilde introduces the greater context, making a typically grandiose claim: "I was one who stood in symbolic relations to the art and culture of my age", though he later writes, in a more humble vein, "I have said of myself that I was one who stood in symbolic relations to the art and culture of my age. There is not a single wretched man in this wretched place along with me who does not stand in symbolic relation to the very secret of life. For the secret of life is suffering." Describing briefly his ascendancy and dominance of the literary and social scenes in London, he contrasts his past fame and the attendant pleasure with his current condition and the pain it brings. Pleasure and success are an artifice, he says, while pain wears no mask. He turns to humility as a remedy, and identifies with the other prisoners.

Wilde uses Isaiah 53:3 to introduce his Christian theme: "He is despised and rejected of men, a man of sorrows and acquainted with grief and we hid our faces from him." Though Peter Raby acknowledges the "obvious relevance" of this quotation to Wilde's situation, he argues that the line does not necessitate the comparison with Christ implicit in his description of Robert Ross doffing his hat to Wilde after his conviction. Wilde adopts Jesus of Nazareth as a symbol of Western kindness and Eastern serenity and as a rebel-hero of mind, body and soul. Though other romantics had discussed Jesus in artistic terms, Wilde's conception is the most radical. His earlier antinomian attitude is reiterated and he finds no recompense in traditional morality. Though Wilde loved the beauty of religion, he dismissed it now as a source of solace, saying "My Gods dwell in temples made with hands". Reason was similarly lacking: Wilde felt that the law had convicted him unjustly. Instead Wilde reworked his earlier doctrine of the appreciation of experience: all of it must be accepted and transformed, whatever its origin. Wilde declared he would actively accept sorrow and discover humility, be happy and appreciate developments in art and life.

He also felt redemption and fulfilment in his ordeal, realising that his hardship had at least filled him with the fruit of experience:

I wanted to eat of the fruit of all the trees in the garden of the world [...] And so, indeed, I went out, and so I lived. My only mistake was that I confined myself so exclusively to the trees of what seemed to me the sun-lit side of the garden, and shunned the other side for its shadow and its gloom.

Simon Critchley argues that the major element of De Profundis is self-realisation. Wilde, having lost everything dear to him, does not accuse external forces, justified as this might have been, but rather absorbs his hardships through the artistic process into a spiritual experience.

== Style and themes ==
Though a letter, at 50,000 words long De Profundis becomes a sort of dramatic monologue which considers Douglas's supposed responses. Wilde's previous prose writing had a flippant, chatty style, which he again employed for his comic plays. In prison Wilde was disconnected from his audiences, which Declan Kiberd suggested was possibly his harshest punishment. He characterises Wilde as an Irish critic of English social mores ultimately silenced for his polemics, and reports that while convalescing in the sick-bay, Wilde entertained his fellow-patients and carers with stories and wit until the authorities placed a warder beside his bed.

In a preface to the 1905 (and, later, 1912) edition, published as a popular edition by Methuen, Robbie Ross, Wilde's literary executor, published an extract from Wilde's instructions to him which included the author's own summation of the work:

I don't defend my conduct. I explain it. Also in my letter there are several passages which explain my mental development while in prison, and the inevitable evolution of my character and intellectual attitude towards life that has taken place, and I want you and others who stand by me and have affection for me to know exactly in what mood and manner I face the world. Of course, from one point of view, I know that on the day of my release I will merely be moving from one prison into another, and there are times when the whole world seems to be no larger than my cell, and as full of terror for me. Still at the beginning I believe that God made a world for each separate man, and within that world, which is within us, one should seek to live.

According to Kiberd, Wilde conformed to Christ's individualist theme of self-perfection in a new environment: prison. Wilde, who had always ridiculed English society's hypocrisies, had refused the opportunity to flee to France. Kiberd places Wilde within the long tradition of prison writing by Irish Republican prisoners; when Wilde wanted to criticise the penal system after release, he contacted Michael Davitt, an Irish political reformer who had himself been imprisoned in England.

== Publication history ==
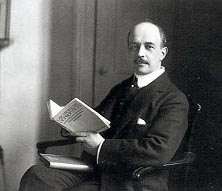
Robert Ross in 1911. He was Wilde's literary executor and oversaw the publication of De Profundis.

On his release, Wilde unburdened himself of the manuscript by giving it to Robbie Ross, with the putative title Epistola: In Carcere et Vinculis ("Letter: In Prison and in Chains"), Ross and Reggie Turner met the exiled Wilde on the ferry from England at Dieppe on 20 May 1897. The manuscript comprised eighty close-written pages on twenty folio sheets of thin blue prison paper. Ross was instructed to make two typed copies, one for Wilde himself, and to send the original to Lord Alfred. However, fearing that Douglas would destroy the original, Ross sent him a copy instead (Douglas said at the 1913 Ransome libel trial that he burnt the copy he was sent without reading it). Due to its length, Ross could not have it fully typed until August.

In 1905, Wilde's contemporary translator to German, Max Meyerfeld, published the first book edition with Samuel Fischer in Berlin which was preceded by a publication in Fischer's monthly magazine Neue Rundschau (Vol. 16, Nos. 1–2 [Jan.–Febr. 1905]). The book appeared on 11 February 1905 and hence preceded the English edition by Ross by about two weeks. Ross published the letter with the title "De Profundis", expurgating all references to the Queensberry family. This edition would have eight printings during the next three years, including de luxe editions. The title, meaning "from the depths", comes from Psalm 130, "From the depths, I have cried out to you, O Lord". In 1924, when Lord Alfred served six months in prison for libel against Winston Churchill, he wrote a sonnet sequence entitled In Excelsis ("In the heights"), intentionally referencing Wilde's letter.

A second, slightly expanded, version of De Profundis appeared in the edition of Collected Works of Wilde published by Ross between 1908 and 1922. Also included were three other letters Wilde wrote from Reading Prison and his two letters to the editor of the Daily Chronicle written after his release. Ross then donated the manuscript to the British Museum on the understanding that it would not be made public until 1960. The manuscript is now in the British Library.

In 1913, the unabridged text was read in court. In 1912 Arthur Ransome had published Oscar Wilde: a critical study. Douglas sued Ransome for libel, and the case went to the High Court in April 1913. Ransome's counsel (Campbell) had the unabridged De Profundis read to the High Court. While the full text "was so inconsistent as to be quite unreliable as evidence of anything except Wilde's fluctuating state of mind while in prison .... the endless text, read out by Campbell's junior, bored the jury and further irritated the judge. They rebelled, and the reading was broken off; but the unalterable impression that it left in everybody's mind was that Bosie was, in Labouchere's words, a young scoundrel and that he had ruined his great friend." Douglas testified that he had received the letter from Ross, but after reading Ross's cover note threw it in a fire unread. He said later that he had never received the package at all. Observers reported that Douglas could not bear it when he learned that the letter was addressed to him and heard its full contents. Once during the reading he simply disappeared, and was rebuked by the judge. Parts of the text were published subsequently in the London newspapers. Ross quickly brought out another edition: The Suppressed Portion of "De Profundis", to claim the copyright on Wilde's work. It contained about half of the complete text.

In 1949, Wilde's son Vyvyan Holland published the full text, but used a faulty typescript bequeathed to him by Ross. Ross's typescripts had contained several hundred errors, including typist's mistakes, his own emendations, and other omissions.

In 1960, Rupert Hart-Davis examined the manuscript in the library of the British Museum, and produced a new, corrected text from it, which was published in The Letters of Oscar Wilde in 1962. He wrote that:

In July Ruth and I had the excitement of being the first people to see the original manuscript of Oscar's longest, best, and most important letter De Profundis, which had been given to the British Museum by Robbie Ross with a fifty-year ban on anyone's seeing it, so as to make sure Lord Alfred Douglas never saw it. To our delight, we found that the published versions were wildly inaccurate, so our version in The Letters was the first accurate text in print.

The 1962 Hart-Davis edition is currently still in print in the expanded version of the book titled The Complete Letters of Oscar Wilde, which was published in New York and London in 2000. The British Library (formerly British Museum) published a facsimile of the original manuscript in 2000. The copyright to the text expired in the United Kingdom in 2013; the facsimile has since been in the public domain and is reproduced on the website of the British Library.

In 2005, Oxford University Press published Volume 2 of The Complete Works of Oscar Wilde. In this volume, entitled De Profundis; 'Epistola: In Carcere et Vinculis', editor Ian Small tried "to establish an authoritative (and perhaps definitive) text" of Wilde's prison letter. The volume also aimed to "present the complete textual history of one of the most famous love letters ever written". According to Thefreelibrary.com, Ian Small "creates an 'eclectic text' based on Vyvyan Holland's 1949 text into which he has collated and interpolated material from the manuscript. There has been some reordering and the omission of 1000 words, here included in square brackets".

German academic Horst Schroeder has, however, compared the previously published typescripts of the De Profundis text to German-language translations that were published during the first quarter of the 20th century and were prepared by Max Meyerfeld from typescripts he had received from Robert Ross. Based on his findings, Schroeder argues that, due to the large amount of typing errors and unauthorised changes, no previously published typescript of the text (including the 1949 Holland edition) is suitable as a base text and that only the British Museum manuscript (i.e. the 1962 Hart-Davis edition) is "what really matters".

=== Copyright ===
Because of its posthumous publication in 1962 and the many changes to copyright law since then, the copyright of the full original text of De Profundis (the 1962 Hart-Davis edition) has had a very different history in different countries. Substantially, the text is in the public domain in the UK and in the European Union (at the very least in Ireland, France and Germany), but copyright in the United States and Australia.

- The text has been in the public domain in the United Kingdom since 1 January 2013 (rule: published before the Copyright, Designs and Patents Act 1988; publication date [1962] plus 50 years after the end of the year).
- The text has been in the public domain in the Republic of Ireland since 1 January 2013 (Section 8(5)(a)(i) of the Copyright Act, 1963: publication date [1962] plus 50 years after the end of the year).
- The text has been in the public domain in Germany since 1 January 1973 (rule: the copyright had expired upon publication in 1962 [rule: 50 years after the death of the author], no "posthumous works" rule existed in 1962; 10 years copyright for edited work from publication date [1962] according to Section 70 German Copyright Act of 1965).
- The text has been in the public domain in the whole of the European Union at the latest since 1 January 2013 (UK Designs and Patents Act 1988; publication date [1962] plus 50 years after the end of the year) as the 2006 EU Copyright Term Directive does not provide for a known author's copyright to extend beyond 70 years after his death (i.e. there is no "posthumous publication copyright" for authors; there is one for editors of a work unpublished during the copyright term of an author, though, granting 25 years from publication; Article 4).
- The text will be copyright in Australia until 1 January 2033 (rule: published after 1955, therefore publication date [1962] plus 70 years after the end of the year).
- The text will be copyright in the United States until 2057 (rule: published with compliant copyright notice between 1923 and 1963, and the copyright was renewed [in 1990 by the Estate of Oscar Wilde], therefore 95 years after the publication date [1962]).

== Reception ==
G. S. Street, who had earlier been an intellectual opponent of the decadents, had two impressions of De Profundis: one, "that it was poignantly touching, the other it was extraordinarily and profoundly interesting". Street dismissed contemporary complaints that the letter lacked sincerity, saying this was just a manifestation of those who opposed Wilde's graceful writing style.

Max Beerbohm, an old friend of Wilde's, wrote a signed review, "A Lord of Language", for Vanity Fair. He described the writing in De Profundis as having achieved the perfect grace of Wilde's earlier work, and said that Wilde had remained a detached artist of words, concluding: "We see him here as the spectator of his own tragedy. His tragedy was great. It is one of the tragedies that will always live on in romantic history."

T. W. H. Crosland, a journalist and friend of Douglas after Wilde's death, negatively reviewed De Profundis in 1912. He strongly criticised Ross's editing, but claimed the entire document was even more morally bankrupt than the published version: "A blacker, fiercer, falser, craftier, more grovelling or more abominable piece of writing never fell from a mortal pen", he wrote.

== Dramatic adaptations ==
Portions of the letter were incorporated into the solo stage performance by Vincent Price that premiered on Broadway in 1978, Diversions and Delights.

A version abridged by Merlin Holland was performed by Corin Redgrave in 2000 at the Royal National Theatre in London. It was revived in 2008.

An abridged version was set for speaking pianist by composer Frederic Rzewski.

Extracts were set to music for chorus and orchestra in 2012 by the British composer Matthew King. They were later developed into an immersive nightclub drag musical at Harvard in 2015 and later in New York City in 2019, OSCAR at The Crown and the love that dare not speak its name.

== Editions ==
- Holland, Merlin & Rupert Hart-Davis: The Complete Letters of Oscar Wilde (2000). US edition: Henry Holt and Company LLC, New York. ISBN 0-8050-5915-6. UK edition: Fourth Estate, London. ISBN 978-1-85702-781-5. Pages 683–780. (This is an expanded version of the 1962 book The Letters of Oscar Wilde edited by Rupert Hart-Davis; both versions contain the text of the British Museum manuscript).
- Ian Small (editor): The Complete Works of Oscar Wilde. Volume II: De Profundis; Epistola: In Carcere et Vinculis (2005). Oxford University Press, Oxford. ISBN 978-0-19-811962-3. (This volume contains the text of the British Museum manuscript as well as the versions published by Vyvyan Holland and Robert Ross).

== Bibliography ==
- Belford, Barbara (2000). Oscar Wilde: A Certain Genius. New York: Random House. p. 251. ISBN 0-679-45734-8.
- Beckson, Karl E. (1970). Oscar Wilde: The Critical Heritage. London: Routledge. ISBN 978-0-7100-6929-0.
- Brogan, Hugh (1984). The Life of Arthur Ransome. London: Jonathan Cape. ISBN 0-224-02010-2.
- Ellmann, Richard (1988). Oscar Wilde. New York: Vintage Books. ISBN 978-0-394-75984-5.
- Holland, Merlin (2004). The Real Trial of Oscar Wilde. HarperCollins. ISBN 978-0-00-715805-8. Archived from the original on 20 August 2020.
- Holland, Merlin; Hart-Davis, Rupert, eds. (2000). The Complete Letters of Oscar Wilde. New York: Henry Holt and Co. ISBN 0-8050-5915-6. (British edition: London: Fourth Estate. ISBN 978-1-85702-781-5).
- Kiberd, D. (2000) Irish Classics Granata ISBN 1-86207-459-3
- Mason, Stuart (1914; new ed. 1972) Bibliography of Oscar Wilde. Rota pub; Haskell House Pub ISBN 0-8383-1378-7
- Raby, Peter (1988) Oscar Wilde: A Critical Study
- Wilde, Oscar (1996). De Profundis. Mineola, NY: Dover. ISBN 0-486-29308-4.
