= Hisako Koyama =

Japanese solar observer

- Hisako Koyama adjusting her telescope, 1951
- Born: 1916
- Died: 1997 (aged 80–81)
- Citizenship: Japan
- Known for: Creating a multi-century sunspot record
- Scientific career
- Fields: Astronomy
- Institutions: National Museum of Nature and Science
- Patrons: Issei Yamamoto

Hisako Koyama (1916–1997) was a Japanese solar observer, whose multidecade collection of detailed sunspot sketches played a role in reconstructing a continuous sunspot record dating back to 1610. Koyama worked as a staff member of the National Museum of Nature and Science, Tokyo for more than 40 years and completed more than 10,000 solar sketches during her lifetime. In 1986, she was the recipient of the Oriental Astronomical Association Prize of Encouragement of Academic Research. In 2012, a minor planet was renamed 3383 Koyama in honour of her at the proposal of another Oriental Astronomical Association member.

== Early life ==
Growing up, Koyama developed an interest in astronomy and making space observations. Before she began her career as a staff observer, Koyama would read books about astronomy and go star watching with astronomical charts. During World War II, she would use city-wide air-raid blackouts as opportunities to set up a futon in her yard and make celestial observations. Inspired by a visit to the Tonichi Planetarium at Yūrakuchō in Tokyo, Koyama assembled a small telescope of her own.

== Education and career ==
Koyama graduated from an all-girls high school in Tokyo the 1930s. “In so doing she achieved at that time a level of education of which many girls could only dream,” noted a commentary published in the journal Space Weather.

After receiving a 36 mm X 60 refractor telescope from her father, Koyama began observing sunspots. In 1944, she submitted her first sunspot sketch to Issei Yamamoto, professor of astronomy at Kyoto University, who was serving as Oriental Astronomical Association Solar section president at the time. Guided by Yamamoto, Koyama began making semiregular sunspot sketches using a technique called “attenuated direct-viewing.” This method involved projecting images from a mounted telescope onto a sheet of paper, whereupon Koyama would sketch visible solar features and document other notable observational information.

By 1946, Koyama started working as a professional staff observer at the National Museum of Nature and Science, Tokyo, which was then called the Tokyo Science Museum. She officially retired from the museum in 1981, but continued to contribute as a Fellow of the Museum for 10 more years. From 1947 to 1984, Koyama documented more than 8,000 sunspot groups, which she published in a monograph in 1985. Her original sunspot sketches have been preserved in the National Museum of Nature and Science, Tokyo.

== Legacy ==
In 2014, an international team of researchers utilized Koyama’s sunspot records to reconstruct a nearly 400-year history of sunspot activity, dating from the 1610s and the early 2000s. The project also relied on sketches drawn by Galileo Galilei, Pierre Gassendi, Johann Caspar Staudacher, Heinrich Schwabe, and Rudolf Wolf. Because Koyama’s sketches were created using the same 20 cm refractor telescope and the same observation method, the researchers were able to use her observations as a backbone for calibrating parts of the sunspot record.

== Selected publications ==
- Koyama, H. (1985). Observations of Sunspots 1947–1984. Tokyo: Kawade Shobo Shinsha Publishers.
- Koyama, H. (1981). 35 years with the 20 cm telescope [in Japanese]. Natural Science and Museums, 48(3), 111–116
