= Life imitating art =

Philosophical position opposed to mimesis

The idea of life imitating art is a philosophical position or observation about how real behaviors or real events sometimes (or even commonly) resemble, or feel inspired by, works of fiction and art. This can include how people act in such a way as to imitate fictional portrayals or concepts, or how they embody or bring to life certain artistic ideals. The phrase may be considered synonymous with anti-mimesis, the direct opposite of Aristotelian mimesis: art imitating real life. The idea's most notable proponent is Oscar Wilde, who opined in his 1889 essay, The Decay of Lying, "Life imitates Art far more than Art imitates Life". In the essay, written as a Platonic dialogue, Wilde holds that anti-mimesis "results not merely from Life's imitative instinct, but from the fact that the self-conscious aim of Life is to find expression, and that Art offers it certain beautiful forms through which it may realise that energy."

== History and analysis ==
An argument in favor of how life imitates art is that what is found in life and nature is not what is really there, but merely what artists have taught people to find there, through their art. An example posited by Wilde is that, although there has been fog in London for centuries, one notices the beauty and wonder of the fog because "poets and painters have taught the loveliness of such effects...They did not exist till Art had invented them".

McGrath places the antimimetic philosophy in a tradition of Irish writing, including Wilde and writers such as Synge and Joyce in a group that "elevate blarney (in the form of linguistic idealism) to aesthetic and philosophical distinction", noting that Terry Eagleton observes an even longer tradition that stretches "as far back in Irish thought as the ninth-century theology of John Scottus Eriugena" and "the fantastic hyperbole of the ancient sagas". Wilde's antimimetic idealism, specifically, McGrath describes being part of the late nineteenth century debate between Romanticism and Realism. Wilde's antimimetic philosophy has also influenced later Irish writers, including Brian Friel.

Halliwell asserts that the idea that life imitates art derives from classical notions that can be traced as far back as the writings of Aristophanes of Byzantium, and does not negate mimesis but rather "displace[s] its purpose onto the artlike fashioning of life itself". Halliwell draws a parallel between Wilde's philosophy and Aristophanes' famous question about the comedies written by Menander: "O Menander and Life! Which of you took the other as your model?", noting, however, that Aristophanes was a precursor to Wilde, and not necessarily espousing the positions that Wilde was later to propound.

In George Bernard Shaw's preface to Three Plays he wrote, "I have noticed that when a certain type of feature appears in painting and is admired as beautiful, it presently becomes common in nature; so that the Beatrices and Francescas in the picture galleries of one generation come to life as the parlor-maids and waitresses of the next." He stated that he created the aristocratic characters in Cashel Byron's Profession as unrealistically priggish even without his later understanding that "the real world does not exist... men and women are made by their own fancies in the image of the imaginary creatures in my youthful fictions, only much stupider." Shaw, however, disagreed with Wilde on some points. He considered most attempts by life to imitate art to be reprehensible, in part because the art that people generally chose to imitate was idealistic and romanticized.
