= On the Decay of the Art of Lying =

"On the Decay of the Art of Lying" is a short essay written by Mark Twain in 1880 for a meeting of the Historical and Antiquarian Club of Hartford, Connecticut. Twain published the text in The Stolen White Elephant Etc. (1882).

In the essay, Twain laments the four ways in which men of America's Gilded Age employ man's "most faithful friend". He concludes by insisting that:

the wise thing is for us diligently to train ourselves to lie thoughtfully, judiciously; to lie with a good object, and not an evil one; to lie for others' advantage, and not our own; to lie healingly, charitably, humanely, not cruelly, hurtfully, maliciously; to lie gracefully and graciously, not awkwardly and clumsily; to lie firmly, frankly, squarely, with head erect, not haltingly, tortuously, with pusillanimous mien, as being ashamed of our high calling.

The essay, Twain notes, was "offered for the thirty-dollar prize", but it "did not take the prize".

== See also ==
- "The Decay of Lying" by Oscar Wilde, 1891.
- "On Bullshit" by Harry Frankfurt, 1986 (in book form 2005).
