= The Letters of Oscar Wilde =

Book of letters by Oscar Wilde (1963)

The Complete Letters of Oscar Wilde
- Author: Oscar Wilde
- Language: English
- Publication date: 2000

The Complete Letters of Oscar Wilde is a book that contains over a thousand pages of letters written by Oscar Wilde. Wilde's letters were first published as The Letters of Oscar Wilde in 1963, edited by Rupert Hart-Davis and published by his publishing firm.

Merlin Holland revised the book and included new discoveries in a new edition: The Complete Letters of Oscar Wilde by Merlin Holland & Rupert Hart-Davis. It was published in 2000 by Henry Holt and Company LLC, New York (ISBN 0-8050-5915-6) and Fourth Estate, London (ISBN 978-1-85702-781-5).

Merlin Holland, Oscar Wilde's grandson, provides an introduction to the work which describes the purpose of publishing Oscar Wilde's letters. The book contains a timeline of Oscar Wilde's life, includes some of his drawings and his famous letter to his lover, Lord Alfred Douglas, known as De Profundis. Expurgated editions of De Profundis had been published by Wilde's literary executor Robbie Ross from 1905, but the 1962 edition published by Rupert Hart-Davis was the first full and correct version, made from the original manuscript in the British Museum.

== Purpose of the book ==
The interest of the book is that Wilde's letters become the "autobiography that he never wrote" (Holland, xiii). In addition, Holland asserts (from the introduction (xiii)):

Now, a hundred years after his death, to read his letters, particularly those written to intimate friends without thought of publication, is as close as we shall come to the magic of hearing him in person.

Here, Holland is referring to Wilde's legendary conversational skills, which have only been partially preserved in the published letters.

The letters give an insight to Oscar Wilde's character, his sense of humor and his great affection and love for many people.
