= Intentions (Oscar Wilde) =

- Original book cover, published in 1894
- Author: Oscar Wilde
- Language: English
- Genre: Essays
- Publication date: 1891
- Publication place: England
- Media type: Print

Intentions: The Decay of Lying, Pen, Pencil and Poison, The Critic as Artist, The Truth of Masks is a collection of essays written by Oscar Wilde and published in England in 1891.

Intentions was later first published in the United States in 1905.

== Essays ==
The Intentions collection of four essays include, The Decay of Lying, Pen, Pencil and Poison, The Critic as Artist, The Truth of Masks.
