= The Critic as Artist =

Essays by Oscar Wilde

"The Critic as Artist" is an essay by Oscar Wilde, containing the most extensive statements of his aesthetic philosophy. A dialogue in two parts, it is by far the longest one included in his collection of essays titled Intentions published on 1 May 1891. "The Critic as Artist" is a significantly revised version of articles that first appeared in the July and September 1890 issues of The Nineteenth Century, originally entitled "The True Function and Value of Criticism." The essay is a conversation between its leading voice Gilbert and Ernest, who suggests ideas for Gilbert to reject.

== Summary ==
The essay sets out to collapse the distinction between fine art and criticism cherished by artists and critics such as Matthew Arnold and James Abbott McNeill Whistler - only critical faculty enables any artistic creation at all, while criticism is independent of the object it criticises and not necessarily subject to it. The essay champions a contemplative life to the life of action. According to Gilbert, scientific principle of heredity shows we are never less free, never have more illusions than when we try to act with some conscious aim in mind. Critical contemplation is guided by conscious aesthetic sense as well as by the soul. The soul is wiser than we are, writes Wilde, it is the concentrated racial experience revealed by the imagination. Criticism is above reason, sincerity and fairness; it is necessarily subjective. It is increasingly more to criticism than to creation that future belongs as its subject matter and the need to impose form on chaos constantly increases. It is criticism rather than emotional sympathies, abstract ethics or commercial advantages that would make us cosmopolitan and serve as the basis of peace.
