= The Decay of Lying =

1891 essay by Oscar Wilde

"The Decay of Lying – An Observation" is an essay by Oscar Wilde, included in his collection of essays titled Intentions, published in 1891. This version of the essay is significantly revised from the article that first appeared in the January 1889 issue of The Nineteenth Century.

Wilde presents the essay as a Socratic dialogue between two characters, Vivian and Cyril, who are named after his own sons. Their conversation, while playful and whimsical, promotes Wilde's view of Aestheticism over Realism. Vivian tells Cyril of an article he has been writing called "The Decay of Lying: A Protest". According to Vivian, the decay of lying "as an art, a science, and a social pleasure" is responsible for the decline of modern literature, which is excessively concerned with the representation of facts and social reality. He writes, "if something cannot be done to check, or at least to modify, our monstrous worship of facts, Art will become sterile and beauty will pass away from the land." Vivian argues that Life imitates Art far more than vice versa. Nature, he argues, is no less an imitation of Art than Life. Vivian also contends that Art is never representative of a time or place: rather, "the highest art rejects the burden of the human spirit [...] She develops purely on her own lines. She is not symbolic of any age." Vivian thus defends Aestheticism and the concept of "art for art's sake". At Cyril's request, Vivian briefly summarizes the doctrines of the "new aesthetics" as follows:

- Art never expresses anything but itself.
- All bad art comes from returning to Life and Nature, and elevating them into ideals.
- Life imitates Art far more than Art imitates Life. It follows as a corollary that external Nature also imitates Art.
- Lying, the telling of beautiful untrue things, is the proper aim of Art.

The essay ends with the two characters going outside, as Cyril asked Vivian to do at the beginning of the essay. Vivian finally complies, saying that twilight nature's "chief use" may be to "illustrate quotations from the poets."

As Michèle Mendelssohn points out, "in an era when sociology was still in its infancy, psychology wasn’t yet a discipline, and theories of performativity were still a long way off, Wilde's essay touched on a profound truth about human behaviour in social situations. The laws of etiquette governing polite society were, in fact, a mask. Tact was merely an elaborate art of impression management."

== See also ==
- "On the Decay of the Art of Lying" by Mark Twain, 1880.
