= A Florentine Tragedy =

Fragment of a never-completed play by Oscar Wilde

A Florentine Tragedy is a fragment of a never-completed play by Oscar Wilde. The subject concerns Simone, a wealthy 16th-century Florentine merchant who finds his wife Bianca in the arms of a local prince, Guido Bardi. After feigning hospitality, Simone challenges the interloper to a duel, disarms him, and strangles him. This awakens the affection of his wife; and the two are reconciled.

The original manuscript for the play is held at the Harry Ransom Center at the University of Texas at Austin as part of their larger holdings by and about Oscar Wilde.

== History ==
In 1914 the young Italian composer Carlo Ravasegna (Turin 1891-Rome 1964) wrote a short opera titled Una tragedia fiorentina to a translation/libretto by Ettore Moschino. The libretto was published with Wilde's name by the Tipografia Subalpina, Turin, 1914.

Giacomo Puccini considered Wilde's play as a potential source material for a new opera before discarding it.

Alexander von Zemlinsky wrote an opera based on a German translation of the play, entitled Eine florentinische Tragödie, which premiered in 1917.

Sergei Prokofiev wrote his opera Maddalena to his own libretto based on a play by Magda Gustavovna Lieven-Orlova written under the pen name Baron Lieven. That play was in turn based on Oscar Wilde's play. The opera had its premiere in a BBC studio recording in London in 1979; and its first live staging was in Graz (Austria) in 1981.

T. Sturge Moore wrote an opening scene for this play for "presentation" purposes.

In 1989, Caspar René Hirschfeld wrote a chamber opera titled Bianca based on the Florentine Tragedy. He used the German translation by Max Meyerfeld. Filling in for the absent first scene, a love scene between Bianca and the prince, Hirschfeld used love poetry from Oscar Wilde himself. The opera was first performed at the Salzburg Festival in 1991.

== See also ==
- Manuscripts of Oscar Wilde
- Music based on the works of Oscar Wilde
