= Nishi-Harima Observatory =

Observatory in Japan

Coordinates: 35.0254°N 134.3356°E

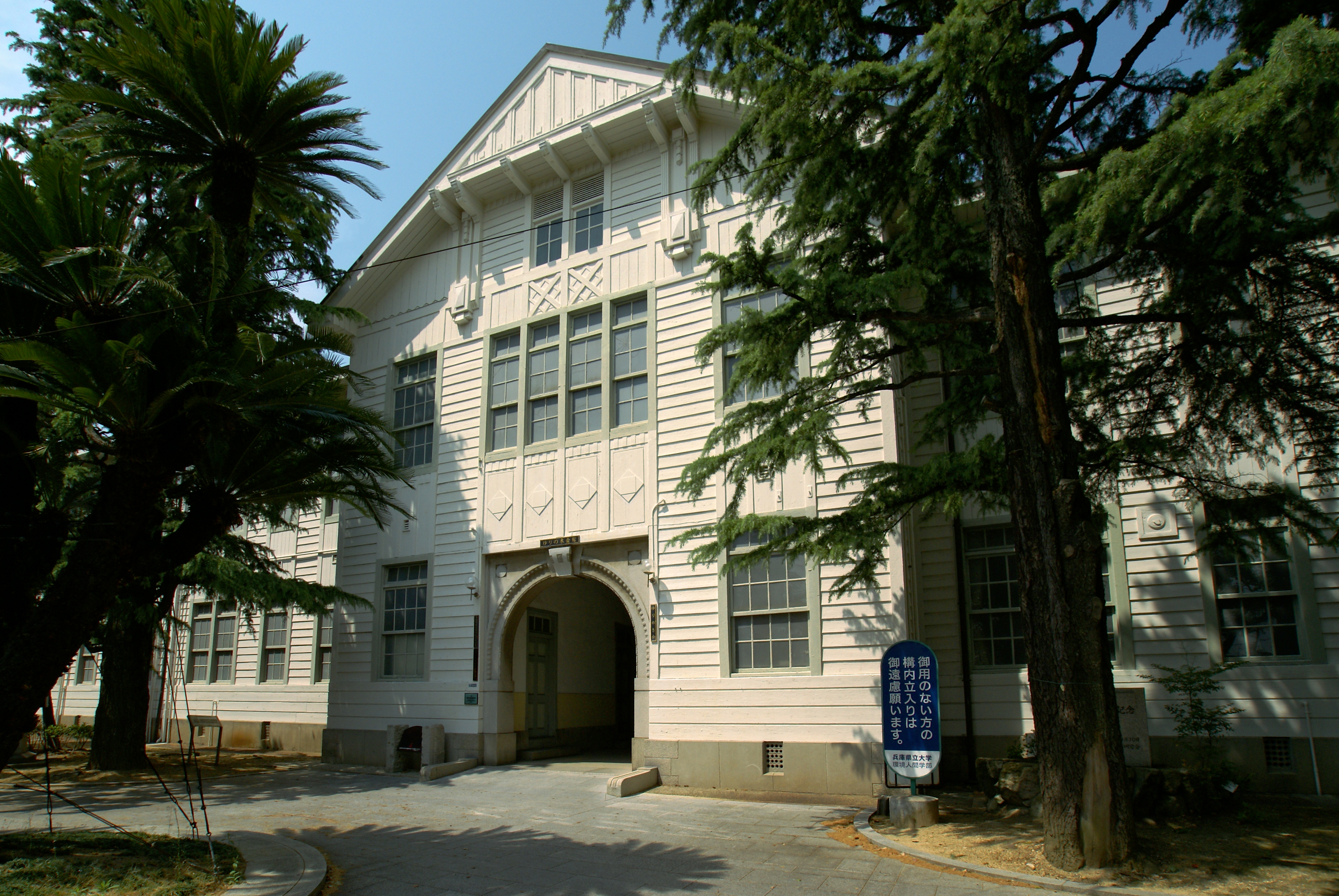
University of Hyogo

The Nishi-Harima Astronomical Observatory (NHAO) is a research facility and a public observatory operated by the University of Hyogo since 2012. The observatory is located on the top of Mount Onade in Sayo Town, Japan.

The largest telescope in NHAO is a Ritchey-Chretien telescope called NAYUTA, with a primary mirror of 2 meters, making it the largest of its kind in Japan. Other instruments include an optical long-slit spectrograph and a near-infrared imager.
