= Issei Yamamoto =

Japanese astronomer

- 山本一清
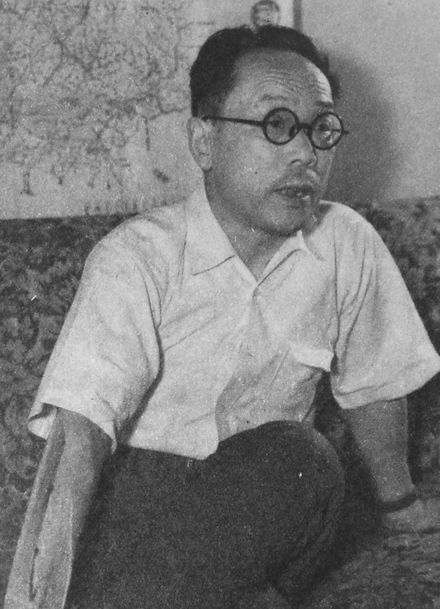
- Born: May 27, 1889
- Died: January 16, 1959 (aged 69)
- Citizenship: Japan
- Scientific career
- Fields: astronomy
- Institutions: Kyoto University, Oriental Astronomical Association, Kwasan Observatory

Issei Yamamoto (山本 一清, Yamamoto Issei, 1889–1959) was a Japanese astronomer and professor at Kyoto University. In 1920, he became first president of the Oriental Astronomical Association. He was director of the Kwasan Observatory in Kyoto.

== Honors ==
Named after him:

- The crater Yamamoto on the Moon.
- Asteroid 2249 Yamamoto.
