= Kwasan Observatory =

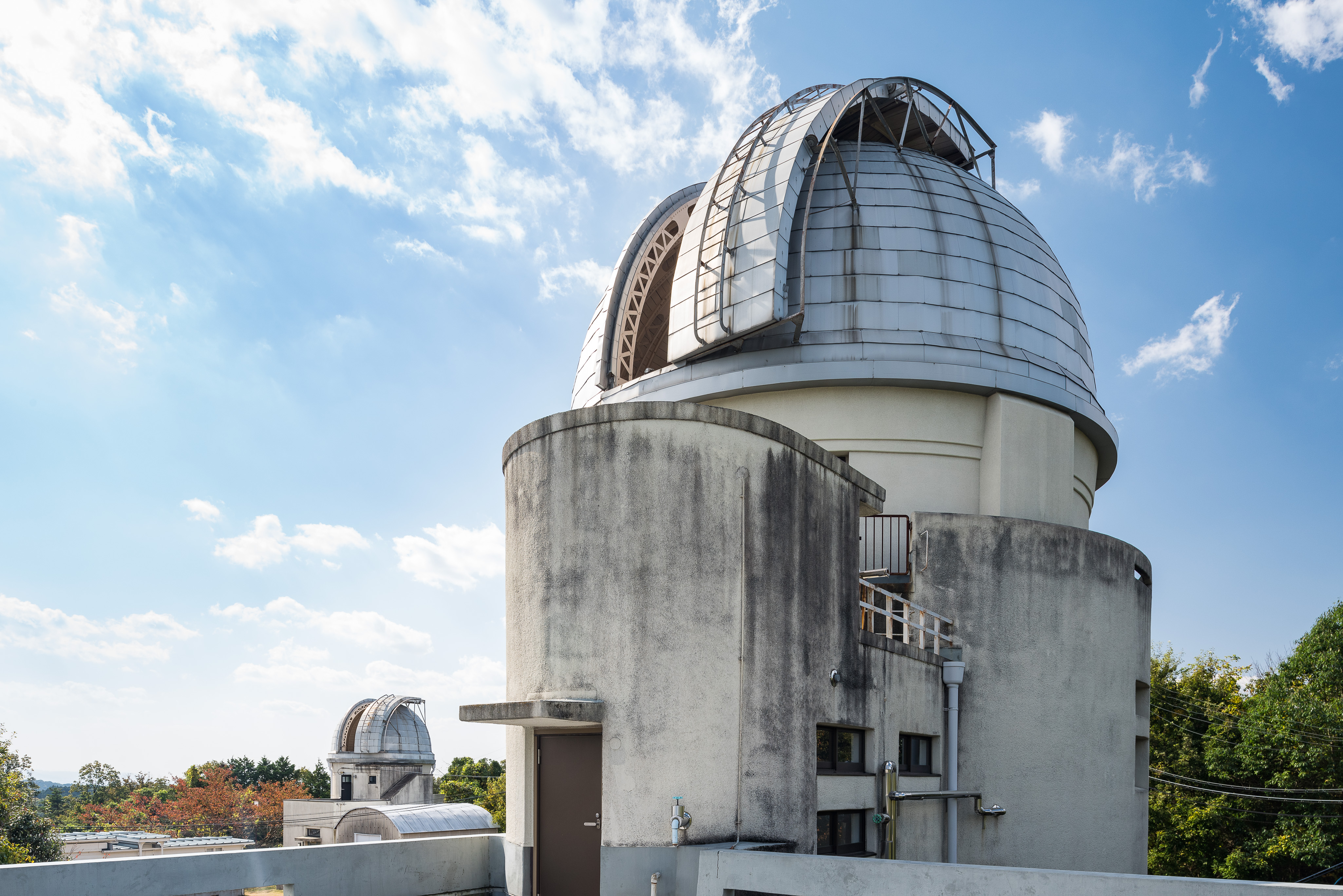
- Organization: Kyoto University
- Observatory code: 377
- Location: Yamashina-ku, Kyoto, Kyoto Prefecture, Japan
- Coordinates: 34°59′37″N 135°47′37″E
- Established: 1929
- Website: www.kwasan.kyoto-u.ac.jp/general/facilities/kwasan/,%20https://www.kwasan.kyoto-u.ac.jp/general/facilities/kwasan/index_en.html
- Location of Kwasan Observatory

Kwasan Observatory is a Japanese observatory in the Kyoto University founded in 1929. Issei Yamamoto was the first director of the observatory.
