= Rudolf Ritter =

Austrian opera singer

Rudolf Ritter (19 January 1878 – 3 June 1966) was an Austrian operatic tenor and singing teacher.

== Career ==
Born in Brüx (then in Bohemia, Austria-Hungary), Ritter, who initially aspired to a military career, served as an officer in the Common Army from 1898 before turning to singing studies at the Academy of Fine Arts Vienna in 1908. In 1910 Ritter made his debut at the Volksoper Wien, whose ensemble he belonged to until 1913. In the same year he was engaged at the court opera in Stuttgart until 1933.

Ritter made guest appearances in North America with the German Opera Company from 1929 to 1931; further tours took him to South Africa, London and Paris. At the Bayreuth Festival of 1924/25, Ritter sang Siegfried in Wagner's Der Ring des Nibelungen as well as the title role in Tannhäuser in 1930.

From 1933 Ritter was active as a singing teacher in Stuttgart, later he moved to Sulzbach am Kocher. Ritter died in 1966 at the age of 88 in Gaildorf near Stuttgart.

== Bibliography ==
- Genossenschaft Deutscher Bühnen-Angehöriger, Deutscher Bühnenverein, Fachschaft Bühne (Reichstheaterkammer), Reichstheaterkammer (Germany). Präsident: Deutsches Bühnen-Jahrbuch, Band 76, F. A. Günther & sohn a.-g., 1968, page 111.
- Walther Killy and Rudolf Vierhaus (editors): Deutsche Biographische Enzyklopädie. Volume 8, K.G. Saur Verlag GmbH & Co. KG, München, 1996 ISBN 3-598-23163-6; Page 332.
