= Donald F. Hyde =

American lawyer

- Born: April 17, 1909; Chillicothe, Ohio, United States
- Died: February 5, 1966 (aged 56); New York

Donald Frizell Hyde (17 April 1909 – 5 February 1966) was president of the Grolier Club and the Bibliographical Society of America, a trustee of the New York Public Library and the Pierpont Morgan Library, and a member of the advisory committees of Harvard and Yale libraries.
