= Fujiwara no Takasuke =

Japanese poet

Fujiwara no Takasuke (藤原隆祐 died 1251) was a waka poet and Japanese nobleman active in the Heian and Kamakura periods. He is designated as a member of the New Thirty-Six Immortals of Poetry (新三十六歌仙, Shinsanjūrokkasen).

He was the son of Fujiwara no Nagataka.
